= Iboga-type alkaloid =

Group of alkaloids related to Tabernanthe iboga

Iboga-type alkaloids are a set of monoterpene indole alkaloids comprising naturally occurring compounds found in Tabernanthe and Tabernaemontana, as well as synthetic structural analogs. Naturally occurring iboga-type alkaloids include ibogamine, ibogaine, tabernanthine, and other substituted ibogamines. Ibogaine is a hallucinogen and is referred to as an oneirogen. Many iboga-type alkaloids display biological activities such as cardiac toxicity and psychoactive effects, and some have been studied as potential treatments for drug addiction.

== Naturally-Occurring ==
Ibogaine

Ibogamine

Tabernanthine

Coronaridine

=== Substituted Ibogamines ===
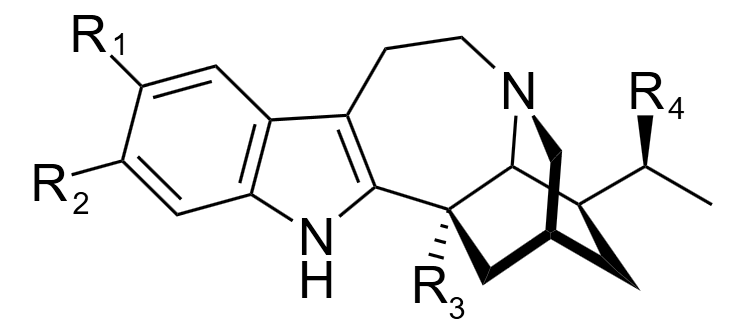

PubChem CID	Name	R1	R2	R3	R4
100217	Ibogamine	H	H	H	H
197060	Ibogaine	OMe	H	H	H
3083548	Noribogaine	OH	H	H	H
6326116	Tabernanthine	H	OMe	H	H
193302	Ibogaline	OMe	OMe	H	H
73489	Coronaridine	H	H	CO_{2}Me	H
73255	Voacangine	OMe	H	CO_{2}Me	H
363281	Isovoacangine	H	OMe	CO_{2}Me	H
65572	Conopharyngine	OMe	OMe	CO_{2}Me	H
11077316	19(S)-Hydroxyibogamine	H	H	H	OH
71656190	Iboxygaine / Kimvuline	OMe	H	H	OH
ND	ND	H	OMe	H	OH
ND	ND	OMe	OMe	H	OH
15559732	19(S)-Hydroxycoronaridine	H	H	CO_{2}Me	OH
196982	Voacristine	OMe	H	CO_{2}Me	OH
10362598	Isovoacristine	H	OMe	CO_{2}Me	OH
102004638	19(S)-Hydroxyconopharyngine	OMe	OMe	CO_{2}Me	OH

Catharanthine is an unsaturated analog of coronaridine.

=== Oxidation Products ===
Similarly to other ring-constrained tryptamines such as yohimbine and mitragynine (see mitragynine pseudoindoxyl), oxidation and rearrangement products of substituted ibogamines have been reported, such as iboluteine (ibogaine pseudoindoxyl) (CID:21589055) and voaluteine (CID:633439).

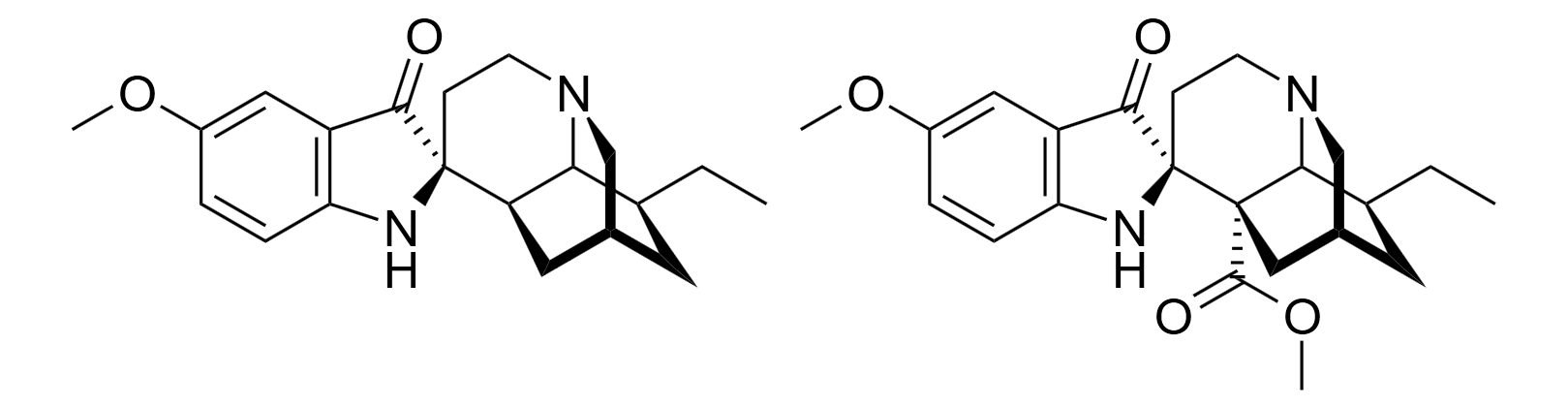
Iboluteine (left) and voaluteine (right), putative metabolites of ibogaine and voacangine, respectively.

=== Other Alkaloids ===
- Vobasine
- Ervaticine
- Dregamine
- Vinblastine

== Treatment of Drug Dependence ==
Ibogaine and related alkaloids reduce the craving for subsequent doses in individuals experiencing withdrawal symptoms associated with drug addiction. Their use has been investigated in several clinical studies involving individuals dependent on opioids, cocaine, and other substances. While positive effects—such as alleviation of withdrawal symptoms, improvement in depression, and mitigation of post-traumatic symptoms—have been confirmed, severe medical complications, including fatal cases, have also been reported due to neurotoxic and cardiotoxic side effects.

== Synthetic Analogues ==
18-MC, ME-18-MC, and 18-MAC are coronaridine analogs with similar anti-addictive effects.

More distantly related synthetic analogs include:

- Varenicline, a polycyclic azepine and anti-addictive agent that similarly targets nicotinic acetylcholine receptors, but acts as a partial agonist instead.
- Tabernanthalog is a structural simplification of tabernanthine and "non-hallucinogenic psychoplastogen".

== See Also ==
- Strictosidine
- Bwiti
- Ibogalog
- List of investigational hallucinogens and entactogens
- Oxa-noribogaine
- Substituted β-carboline and harmala alkaloid
