= C22H28N2O3 =

The molecular formula C_{22}H_{28}N_{2}O_{3} (molar mass: 368.469 g/mol) may refer to:

- Centpropazine
- Hirsutine
- Isovoacangine
- JTE 7-31
- 18-Methoxycoronaridine
- Pentamorphone
- RS130-180
- Voacangine
- THC butanenitrile oxime
