= Conopharyngine =

Names
- IUPAC name Methyl (1S,15S,17S,18S)-17-ethyl-6,7-dimethoxy-3,13-diazapentacyclo[13.3.1.02,10.04,9.013,18]nonadeca-2(10),4,6,8-tetraene-1-carboxylate

Identifiers
CAS Number	76-98-2
3D model (JSmol)	Interactive image
ChEBI	CHEBI:141888
ChEMBL	ChEMBL523582
ChemSpider	19969553
PubChem CID	453209
- InChI: InChI=1S/C23H30N2O4/c1-5-14-8-13-11-23(22(26)29-4)20-15(6-7-25(12-13)21(14)23)16-9-18(27-2)19(28-3)10-17(16)24-20/h9-10,13-14,21,24H,5-8,11-12H2,1-4H3/t13-,14-,21-,23+/m0/s1 Key: DUFLXLVGASPEMV-BPYGGHBPSA-N
- SMILES: CCC1CC2CC3(C1N(C2)CCC4=C3NC5=CC(=C(C=C45)OC)OC)C(=O)OC

Properties
Chemical formula	C_{23}H_{30}N_{2}O_{4}
Molar mass	398.503 g·mol^{−1}
- Except where otherwise noted, data are given for materials in their standard state (at 25 °C [77 °F], 100 kPa). Infobox references

Conopharyngine is the major alkaloid present in the leaves and stem-bark of Tabernaemontana pachysiphon and Conopharyngia durissima. It is closely related voacangine and coronaridine. Conopharyngine pseudoindoxyl, a derivative of it, is also found in the same plant Tabernaemontana pachysiphon.

== Pharmacology ==
It possess central nervous system stimulant activity and produces bradycardia and hypotension in cats. It has weak acetylcholinesterase inhibitory activity and significantly increases hexobarbitone induced sleeping time.

== Toxicity ==
It has low intravenous toxicity in mice (LD_{50} = 143 mg/kg).

== See also ==
- Ibogaline
