= Howard Lotsof =

American scientific researcher

Howard Lotsof (March 1, 1943 – January 31, 2010) was an American scientific researcher who pioneered the use of ibogaine as an approach in Western medicine in the treatment of substance addictions. In 1962, at the age of 19, Lotsof was addicted to heroin and accidentally discovered the anti-addictive effects of ibogaine.

== Biography ==
In 1967 the young Lotsof was arrested and charged for conspiracy to sell LSD, a violation of federal narcotics laws. He was convicted on this charge but acquitted on three other counts related to alleged narcotics violations. He later attended Fairleigh Dickinson University and New York University, graduating with a degree in film in 1976.

Lotsof authored and co-authored numerous research papers and was awarded patents for the treatment of various chemical dependencies with ibogaine. The first of his patents, issued in 1985, was U.S. patent 4,499,096, Rapid Method for Interrupting the Narcotic Addiction Syndrome. The last patent in the series for the use of ibogaine to treat chemical dependence was U.S. patent 5,152,994, Rapid Method for Interrupting or Attenuating Poly-Drug Dependency Syndromes, awarded October 6, 1992. Lotsof was active in promoting medical usage and further research of ibogaine and had an interest in chemical dependence patient advocacy including authoring the Ibogaine Patients' Bill of Rights.

The systematic use of ibogaine was developed first by the Bwiti discipline from where it originated, by the Babongo, Mitsogo and Fang peoples of Gabon and Cameroon, while Western clinical treatment, mostly for the treatment of substance addictions, began was pioneered by Lotsof and others. In the 1980s, Lotsof convinced a Belgian company to manufacture ibogaine in capsule form and performed successful trials in the Netherlands. The use of ibogaine spread across Europe, and was brought to the Americas by Eric Taub in 1992, who had contacted Lotsof in 1989. Lex Kogan later joined Taub and systematized the treatment of ibogaine with centers across the world, and further academic research and trials were conducted by Deborah Mash. As the use of ibogaine spread, its administration has varied widely, with some groups administering it systematically with well developed methods and medical personnel, while many use or administer it haphazardly in a way that many believe is dangerous.

In late 1990 Howard Lotsof contacted Dr. Jan Bastiaans, the Dutch psychiatrist who had been using LSD in treating Holocaust survivors and other severely traumatized patients. Their collaboration began in 1991 after a year of discussions regarding the potential of ibogaine as a treatment for heroin addiction, during which Bastiaans agreed to observe and participate in ibogaine treatments facilitated by Lotsof’s organization, NDA International. Lotsof moved to the White Hotel clinic near Amsterdam. In 1994 a 24-year-old German female drug addict died in their clinic after having taken an overdose of heroin while undergoing ibogaine treatment. The German patient, Nicola K., died of respiratory arrest approximately 19 hours after receiving ibogaine. Bastiaans lost his medical license. He died in 1997.

Lotsof returned to the U.S. He was a member of the Board of Directors of the National Alliance of Methadone Advocates and President of the Dora Weiner Foundation. In March 2009, Lotsof was honored for his discovery of ibogaine's antiaddictive effects during the Sayulita, Mexico ibogaine Provider and Facilitator conference. Some fifty experts from around the world joined to present on ibogaine and associated subjects.

He died on January 31, 2010, aged 66, from liver cancer.

== Personal life ==
Lotsof was born in The Bronx, New York to Abnor and Lillian Lotsof. In 1964, he married Norma Alexander.
