= 19,20-Dihydroervahanine A =

Names
- IUPAC name Methyl (1S,15R,17S,18S)-17-ethyl-6-[(1S,12R,14S,15S,18S)-15-ethyl-18-methoxycarbonyl-17-methyl-10,17-diazatetracyclo[12.3.1.0^{3,11}.0^{4,9}]octadeca-3(11),4,6,8-tetraen-12-yl]-3,13-diazapentacyclo[13.3.1.0^{2,10}.0^{4,9}.0^{13,18}]nonadeca-2(10),4(9),5,7-tetraene-1-carboxylate

Identifiers
CAS Number	175478-70-3
3D model (JSmol)	Interactive image
ChEMBL	ChEMBL2018162
ChemSpider	28501024
PubChem CID	70687579
- InChI: InChI=1S/C42H52N4O4/c1-6-24-16-23-20-42(41(48)50-5)38-29(14-15-46(21-23)39(24)42)28-13-12-26(17-34(28)44-38)31-18-30-25(7-2)22-45(3)35(36(30)40(47)49-4)19-32-27-10-8-9-11-33(27)43-37(31)32/h8-13,17,23-25,30-31,35-36,39,43-44H,6-7,14-16,18-22H2,1-5H3/t23-,24-,25+,30+,31+,35-,36?,39-,42+/m0/s1 Key: PKHROTRJQXGCIW-XIVABZEMSA-N
- SMILES: CC[C@H]1C[C@H]2C[C@@]3([C@H]1N(C2)CCC4=C3NC5=C4C=CC(=C5)[C@H]6C[C@@H]7[C@@H](CN([C@H](C7C(=O)OC)CC8=C6NC9=CC=CC=C89)C)CC)C(=O)OC

Properties
Chemical formula	C_{42}H_{52}N_{4}O_{4}
Molar mass	676.902 g·mol^{−1}
- Except where otherwise noted, data are given for materials in their standard state (at 25 °C [77 °F], 100 kPa). Infobox references

19,20-Dihydroervahanine A is an alkaloid, a natural product which is found in the root of the Southeast Asian plant Tabernaemontana divaricata. It inhibits acetylcholinesterase in vitro more potently than galantamine.

== See also ==
- Coronaridine
- Ibogamine
