= Deborah Mash =

American pharmacologist

Deborah Carmen Mash
- Born: 1952 (age 73–74)
- Occupation: Professor
- Known for: Ibogaine research

Academic background
- Education: Miller School of Medicine, University of Miami
- Influences: Karen Berkley; Marsel Mesulam

Academic work
- Discipline: Neurology; Pharmacology
- Sub-discipline: molecular and cellular pharmacology
- Institutions: Miller School of Medicine
- Main interests: neurochemistry; genetics; aging; drug development
- Website: http://uhealthsystem.com/researchers/profile/2675

Deborah Carmen Mash is an American professor of neurology and of molecular and cellular pharmacology at the Miller School of Medicine and director of the Brain Endowment Bank at the University of Miami. She is also the Chief Executive Officer and founder of DemeRx.

== Early research ==
Mash became fascinated with the human brain while she was an undergraduate student at Florida State University. After completing a Bachelor of Arts degree there, she completed a Ph.D. program at the Miller School of Medicine at the University of Miami, and did a postdoctoral fellowship at Harvard Medical School's Beth Israel Hospital in Boston, Massachusetts.

In 1986, she joined the faculty of her alma mater, the University of Miami.

== Ibogaine ==
In 1994, the Food and Drug Administration of the United States granted Mash an Investigational New Drug license, to permit her to research the addiction-stopping capabilities of ibogaine (an oneirogen that occurs in some plants). A lack of funding and other barriers prevented the research from proceeding. Mash and her colleagues had previously discovered that ibogaine is a prodrug that metabolizes into a psychoactive called 12-hydroxyibogamine (or, noribogaine). In the late 1990s she provided some assistance to Healing Transitions Institute for Addiction, a drug detoxification clinic in Cancún where physicians oversaw patients' ibogaine treatments.

== TASER International ==
On eight occasions between 2005 and 2009, she served as an expert witness for the defense in wrongful death claims filed against electroshock weapon manufacturer TASER International. Mash was paid by the company to testify on its behalf, prompting some criticism of a conflict of interest. The company's official position was that the cause of death in Taser fatalities was excited delirium. Excited delirium, a syndrome not recognized by many medical associations including World Health Organization, American Psychiatric Association, and American Medical Association is not included in the International Classification of Diseases or the Diagnostic and Statistical Manual of Mental Disorders. Mash performed post-mortem examinations of the brains of people who were allegedly victims of excited delirium, and reported that most of them showed signs of drug abuse—most frequently cocaine or amphetamine.
