= Ibogaline =

Alkaloid found in Tabernanthe iboga

Names
- IUPAC name (1R,17S)-17-Ethyl-6,7-dimethoxy-3,13-diazapentacyclo[13.3.1.0^{2,10}.0^{4,9}.0^{13,18}]nonadeca-2(10),4,6,8-tetraene
- Other names 12,13-Dimethoxyibogamine

Identifiers
CAS Number	482-18-8
3D model (JSmol)	Interactive image
ChemSpider	167742
PubChem CID	193302
UNII	F9CB5X4DA4
CompTox Dashboard (EPA)	DTXSID70964024
- InChI: InChI=1S/C18H21ClN2/c19-17-7-4-8-18(15-17)21-13-11-20(12-14-21)10-9-16-5-2-1-3-6-16/h1-8,15H,9-14H2 Key: NKMGWZZAFWDLFG-UHFFFAOYSA-N
- SMILES: CC[C@H]1C[C@@H]2C[C@@H]3[C@H]1N(C2)CCC4=C3NC5=CC(=C(C=C45)OC)OC

Properties
Chemical formula	C_{21}H_{28}N_{2}O_{2}
Molar mass	340.467 g·mol^{−1}
- Except where otherwise noted, data are given for materials in their standard state (at 25 °C [77 °F], 100 kPa). Infobox references

Ibogaline is an alkaloid found in Tabernanthe iboga along with the related chemical compounds ibogaine, ibogamine, and other minor alkaloids. It is a relatively smaller component of Tabernanthe iboga root bark total alkaloids (TA) content. It is also present in Tabernaemontana species such as Tabernaemontana australis which shares similar ibogan-biosynthetic pathways. The percentage of ibogaline in T. iboga root bark is up to 15% TA with ibogaine constituting 80% of the alkaloids and ibogamine up to 5%.

== Chemistry ==
=== Derivatives ===
Kisantine and Gabonine are thought to be ibogaline's oxidation byproducts.

== Adverse effect ==
In rodents, ibogaline induces more body tremor and ataxia compared to ibogaine and ibogamine. Among a series of iboga and harmala alkaloids evaluated in rats, the study authors found the following order of potency in causing tremors:

- ED_{50} (μmol/kg, sc): tabernanthine (4.5) > ibogaline (7.6) > harmaline (12.8) > harmine (13.7) > ibogaine (34.8) > noribogaine (176.0)

A subsequent study confirmed these findings.

== See also ==
- Coronaridine
- Voacangine
