= Noribogaine =

Principal psychoactive metabolite of the oneirogen ibogaine

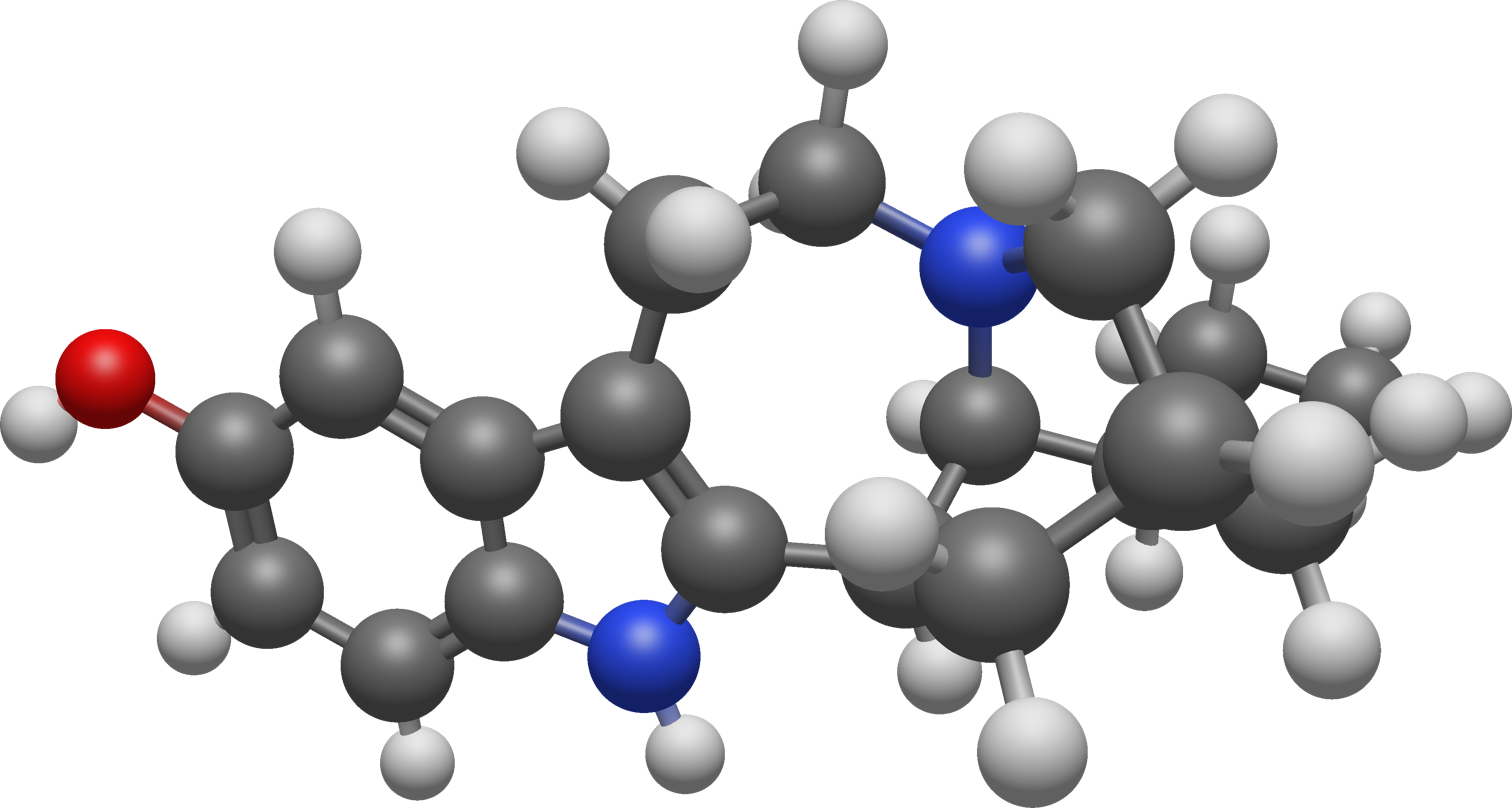

Clinical data
- Other names: 12-Hydroxyibogamine; Ibogamin-12-ol; O-Desmethylibogaine; O-Demethylibogaine; O-Noribogaine; (–)-Noribogaine
- Routes of administration: Oral
- Drug class: κ-Opioid receptor agonist; serotonin reuptake inhibitor; oneirogen

Legal status
- Legal status: AU: S4 (Prescription only); US: Unscheduled (but still a Schedule I analogue due to being a main metabolite of C-I ibogaine)

Pharmacokinetic data
- Elimination half-life: 24–50 hours

Identifiers
- IUPAC name: (1R,15R,17S,18S)-17-ethyl-3,13-diazapentacyclo[13.3.1.02,10.04,9.013,18]nonadeca-2(10),4(9),5,7-tetraen-7-ol
- CAS Number: 481-88-9
- PubChem CID: 3083548
- ChemSpider: 2340735
- UNII: 87T5QTN9SK
- ChEBI: CHEBI:146264
- ChEMBL: ChEMBL343956
- CompTox Dashboard (EPA): DTXSID90963998

Chemical and physical data
- Formula: C_{19}H_{24}N_{2}O
- Molar mass: 296.414 g·mol^{−1}
- 3D model (JSmol): Interactive image
- SMILES: CC[C@H]1C[C@@H]2C[C@@H]3[C@H]1N(C2)CCC4=C3NC5=C4C=C(C=C5)O
- InChI: InChI=1S/C19H24N2O/c1-2-12-7-11-8-16-18-14(5-6-21(10-11)19(12)16)15-9-13(22)3-4-17(15)20-18/h3-4,9,11-12,16,19-20,22H,2,5-8,10H2,1H3/t11-,12+,16+,19+/m1/s1; Key:RAUCDOKTMDOIPF-RYRUWHOVSA-N

Noribogaine, also known as O-desmethylibogaine or 12-hydroxyibogamine, is the principal psychoactive metabolite of the oneirogen ibogaine. It may be involved in the potential antiaddictive effects of ibogaine and ibogaine-containing plant extracts, such as Tabernanthe iboga.

The drug appears to have a complex mechanism of action, with many different observed activities. Some of its most potent actions is atypical κ-opioid receptor agonism and serotonin reuptake inhibition. Noribogaine has potent psychoplastogenic effects similarly to ibogaine.

Noribogaine was first described in the scientific literature by 1958 and was first identified as a metabolite of ibogaine in 1995. It was first studied in humans in 2015.

== Use and effects ==
Noribogaine is the major active metabolite of the oneirogen ibogaine and is thought to be primarily though not exclusively responsible for its effects. In contrast to ibogaine, noribogaine has been limitedly evaluated in humans. It was noted in 2007 that administration of noribogaine to humans had not yet been reported. In 2015 and 2016 however, two clinical studies of noribogaine were published. It was tested at relatively low doses of 3 to 180 mg in these studies. At these doses, no hallucinations, dream-like states, or other hallucinogenic effects were reported. Similarly, it produced no μ-opioid receptor agonistic pharmacodynamic effects, such as pupil constriction or analgesia. At higher doses, in the area of 400 to 1,000 mg or more, ibogaine has been reported to produce hallucinogenic effects.

== Adverse effects ==
Side effects of noribogaine include visual impairment (specifically increased light perception sensitivity), headache, nausea, vomiting, and QT prolongation.

== Interactions ==
Noribogaine may interact with monoamine oxidase inhibitors (MAOIs), for instance due to its serotonin reuptake inhibition.

== Pharmacology ==
=== Pharmacodynamics ===
Noribogaine activities
Target	Affinity (K_{i}, nM)	Species
5-HT_{1A}	>100,000 (K_{i}); IA (EC_{50})	Rat; Human
5-HT_{1B}	>100,000 (K_{i}); IA (EC_{50})	Calf; Human
5-HT_{1D}	>100,000 (K_{i}); IA (EC_{50})	Calf; Human
5-HT_{1E}	ND (K_{i}); IA (EC_{50})	ND; Human
5-HT_{1F}	ND (K_{i}); IA (EC_{50})	ND; Human
5-HT_{2A}	>100,000 (K_{i}); IA (EC_{50})	Rat; Human
5-HT_{2B}	ND (K_{i}); IA (EC_{50})	ND; Human
5-HT_{2C}	>100,000 (K_{i}); IA (EC_{50})	Calf; Human
5-HT_{3}	>100,000 (K_{i}); ND (EC_{50})	Mouse/rat; ND
5-HT_{4}	ND (K_{i}); IA (EC_{50})	ND; Human
5-HT_{5A}	ND (K_{i}); IA (EC_{50})	ND; Human
5-HT_{6}	ND (K_{i}); IA (EC_{50})	ND; Human
5-HT_{7}	ND	ND
α_{1A}–α_{1D}	ND	ND
α_{2A}–α_{2C}	ND	ND
β_{1}–β_{3}	ND	ND
D_{1}, D_{2}	>10,000	Calf
D_{3}	>100,000	Calf
D_{4}, D_{5}	ND	ND
H_{1}–H_{4}	ND	ND
M_{1}	15,000	Calf
M_{2}	36,000	Calf
M_{3}–M_{5}	ND	ND
nACh	ND (K_{i}); 6,820 (IC_{50})	ND; Human
I_{1}, I_{2}	ND	ND
σ_{1}	11,000–15,006	Calf/guinea pig
σ_{2}	5,226–19,000	Calf/rat
MOR	1,520 (K_{i}); 7,420–16,050 (EC_{50}); 3–36% (E_{max})	Human; Human; Human
DOR	5,200–24,720 (K_{i}); IA (EC_{50})	Calf; Human
KOR	720 (K_{i}); 110–8,749 (EC_{50}); 13–85% (E_{max})	Human; Human; Human
NOP	>100,000	Bovine
TAAR1	ND	ND
PCP	5,480–38,200	Various
SERT	41 (K_{i}); 280–326 (IC_{50}); 840 or IA (EC_{50}); ~30% or IA (E_{max})	Human; Human; Human; Human
NET	ND (K_{i}); 39,000 (IC_{50}); ND (EC_{50})	ND; Bovine; ND
DAT	2,050 (K_{i}); 6,760 (IC_{50}); ND (EC_{50})	Human; Human; ND
VMAT2	570–29,500 (IC_{50})	Human
OCT2	6,180 (IC_{50})	Human
VGSC	17,000 (K_{i})	Bovine
VGCC	ND (IC_{50})	ND
hERG	1,960 (K_{i}); 2,860 (IC_{50})	Human; Human
Notes: The smaller the value, the more avidly the drug binds to the site. All proteins are human unless otherwise specified. Refs:

Noribogaine has been determined to act as a biased agonist of the κ-opioid receptor (KOR). It activates the G protein (GDP-GTP exchange) signaling pathway with 75% the efficacy of dynorphin A (EC_{50} = 9 μM), but it is only 12% as efficacious at activating the β-arrestin pathway. With an IC_{50} value of 1 μM, it can be regarded as an antagonist of the latter pathway.

The β-arrestin signaling pathway is hypothesized to be responsible for the anxiogenic, dysphoric, or anhedonic effects of KOR activation. Attenuation of the β-arrestin pathway by noribogaine may be the reason for the absence of these aversive effects, while retaining analgesic and antiaddictive properties. This biased KOR activity makes it stand out from the other iboga alkaloids like ibogaine and the derivative 18-methoxycoronaridine (18-MC). Some other examples of atypical or biased KOR agonists include RB-64, 6'-GNTI, herkinorin, and nalfurafine.

Noribogaine is a potent serotonin reuptake inhibitor, but does not affect the reuptake of dopamine. Unlike ibogaine, noribogaine does not bind to the sigma σ_{2} receptor. Similarly to ibogaine, noribogaine acts as a weak NMDA receptor antagonist and binds to opioid receptors. It has greater affinity for each of the opioid receptors than does ibogaine. Noribogaine has been reported to be a low-efficacy serotonin releasing agent, although findings are conflicting and other studies have found that it is inactive as a serotonin releasing agent. As with ibogaine, noribogaine is inactive as an agonist of the serotonin 5-HT_{2A} receptor.

Noribogaine is a hERG inhibitor and appears at least as potent as ibogaine. The inhibition of the hERG potassium channel delays the repolarization of cardiac action potentials, resulting in QT interval prolongation and, subsequently, in arrhythmias and sudden cardiac arrest.

Ibogaine and the structurally related hallucinogen harmaline are tremorigenic, whereas noribogaine is not or is much less so.

Noribogaine, but not ibogaine, produces potent psychoplastogenic effects in vitro in preclinical research. This can be blocked by the serotonin 5-HT_{2A} receptor antagonist ketanserin, by the mTOR inhibitor rapamycin, and by a TrkB antagonist.

=== Pharmacokinetics ===
Noribogaine is highly lipophilic and shows high brain penetration in rodents.

The elimination half-life of noribogaine is 24 to 50 hours.

== Chemistry ==
=== Analogues ===
Analogues of noribogaine include ibogaine, ibogamine, desethylibogamine, voacangine, tabernanthine, coronaridine, oxa-noribogaine, and GM-3009, among others.

== Research ==
Noribogaine was first described in the scientific literature by at least 1958. It was first identified and described as a metabolite of ibogaine by 1995. The first evaluation of noribogaine in humans was published in 2015. In April 2026, the FDA allowed a Phase I clinical study of noribogaine hydrochloride to proceed in the United States.

== See also ==
- Iboga alkaloid
- κ-Opioid receptor agonist
- List of investigational hallucinogens and entactogens
