= Isovoacangine =

Chemical compound

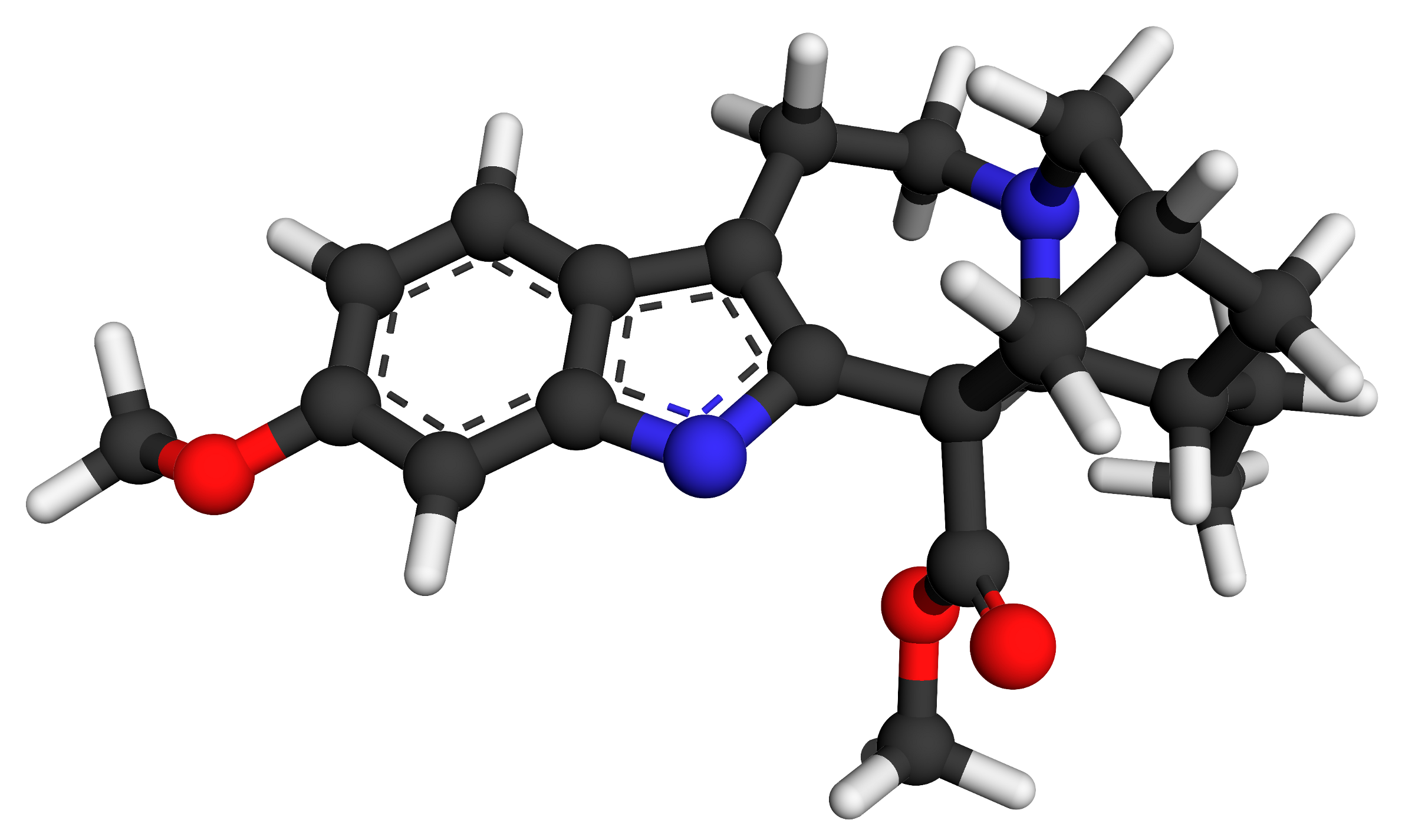

Identifiers
- IUPAC name: methyl 17-ethyl-6-methoxy-3,13-diazapentacyclo[13.3.1.0^{2,10}.0^{4,9}.0^{13,18}]nonadeca-2(10),4(9),5,7-tetraene-1-carboxylate
- CAS Number: 596-54-3
- PubChem CID: 494627
- ChemSpider: 432954
- UNII: P8CJL984MK
- ChEMBL: ChEMBL360427

Chemical and physical data
- Formula: C_{22}H_{28}N_{2}O_{3}
- Molar mass: 368.477 g·mol^{−1}
- 3D model (JSmol): Interactive image
- SMILES: CCC1CC2CC3(C1N(C2)CCc4c3[nH]c5c4ccc(c5)OC)C(=O)OC
- InChI: InChI=1S/C22H28N2O3/c1-4-14-9-13-11-22(21(25)27-3)19-17(7-8-24(12-13)20(14)22)16-6-5-15(26-2)10-18(16)23-19/h5-6,10,13-14,20,23H,4,7-9,11-12H2,1-3H3; Key:FPUHKQMDWMVBRI-UHFFFAOYSA-N

Isovoacangine is a naturally occurring substance that has action on heart muscles in pigs.

== Chemistry ==
=== Derivatives ===
3-Hydroxyisovoacangine and 3-(2'-oxopropyl)isovoacangine are derivates of isovoacangine.

== Natural occurrence ==
It occurs naturally in many Tabernaemontana (milkwood) species such as Tabernaemontana pachysiphon and Tabernaemontana divaricata.

== See also ==
- Voacangine
- Tabernanthine
- Ibogaline
- Vinervine
