= Ibogaine =

Psychoactive substance found in plants in the family Apocynaceae

- Skeletal structure of ibogaine

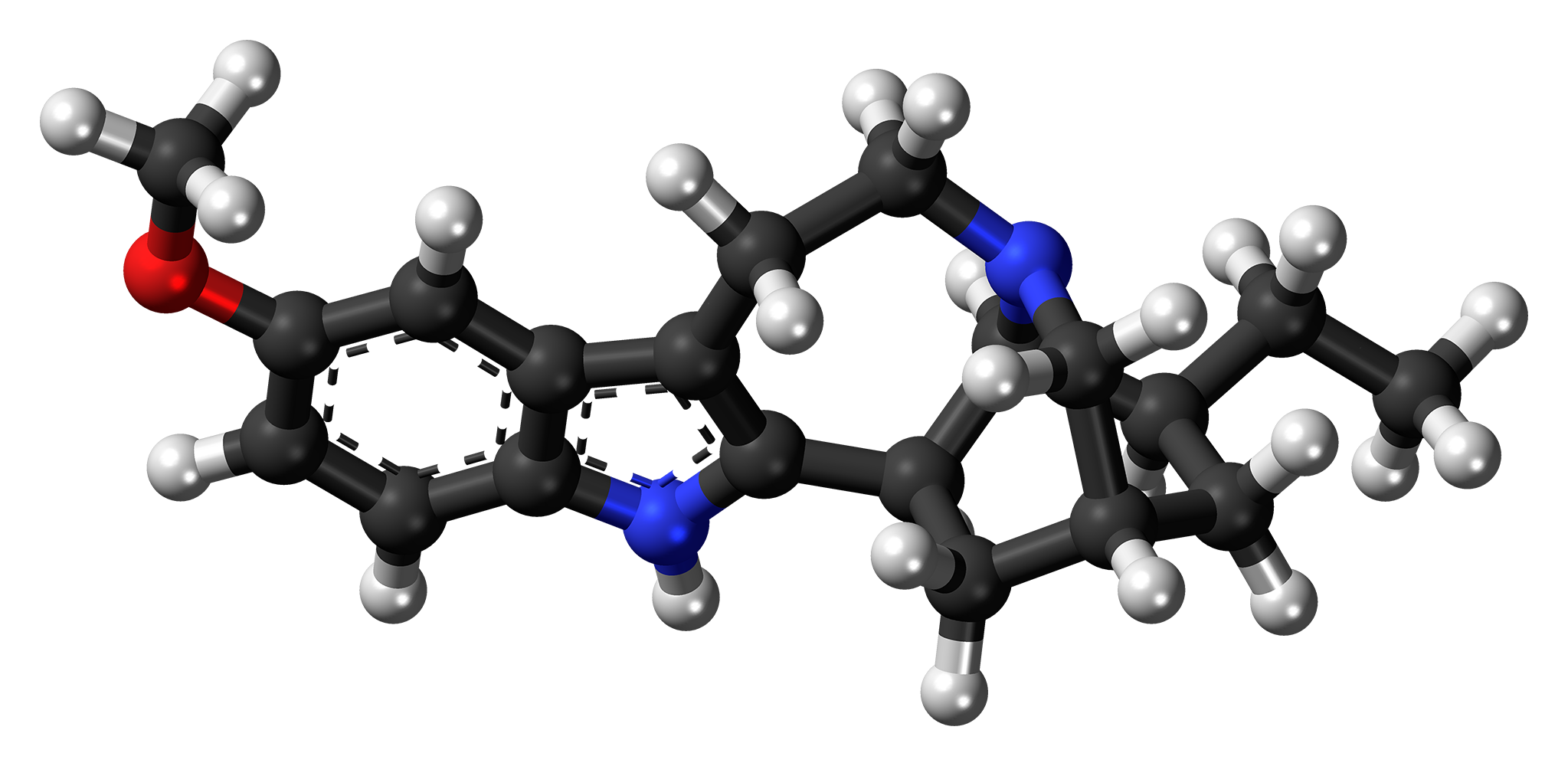
- Ball-and-stick model of ibogaine

Clinical data
- Trade names: Lambarène; Iperton; Endabuse
- Other names: 12-Methoxyibogamine
- Routes of administration: Oral
- Drug class: Hallucinogen; Oneirogen; Stimulant
- ATC code: None

Legal status
- Legal status: AU: legal; CA: legal; NZ: Prescription only; UK: Under Psychoactive Substances Act; US: Schedule I; UN: Unscheduled

Pharmacokinetic data
- Metabolites: Noribogaine (major active metabolite)
- Onset of action: 1–3 hours
- Elimination half-life: Ibogaine: 7 hours Noribogaine: 24–50 hours
- Duration of action: 18–36 hours (but up to 96 hours or more in total)

Identifiers
- IUPAC name: (1R,15R,17S,18S)-17-ethyl-7-methoxy-3,13-diazapentacyclo[13.3.1.02,10.04,9.013,18]nonadeca-2(10),4(9),5,7-tetraene
- CAS Number: 83-74-9
- PubChem CID: 197060
- ChemSpider: 170667
- UNII: 3S814I130U
- ChEBI: CHEBI:5852
- ChEMBL: ChEMBL1215855
- CompTox Dashboard (EPA): DTXSID20894069
- ECHA InfoCard: 100.001.363

Chemical and physical data
- Formula: C_{20}H_{26}N_{2}O
- Molar mass: 310.441 g·mol^{−1}
- 3D model (JSmol): Interactive image
- Melting point: 152 to 153 °C (306 to 307 °F)
- SMILES: CC[C@H]1C[C@@H]2C[C@H]3c4[nH]c5ccc(OC)cc5c4CC[N@@](C2)[C@@H]13
- InChI: InChI=1S/C20H26N2O/c1-3-13-8-12-9-17-19-15(6-7-22(11-12)20(13)17)16-10-14(23-2)4-5-18(16)21-19/h4-5,10,12-13,17,20-21H,3,6-9,11H2,1-2H3/t12-,13+,17+,20+/m1/s1; Key:HSIBGVUMFOSJPD-CFDPKNGZSA-N

Ibogaine is a psychoactive indole alkaloid derived from plants such as Tabernanthe iboga, characterized by hallucinogenic and oneirogenic effects. Ibogaine exhibits complex pharmacology by interacting with multiple neurotransmitter systems, notably affecting opioid, serotonin, sigma, NMDA, and nicotinic acetylcholine receptors; its metabolite noribogaine primarily acts as a serotonin reuptake inhibitor and κ-opioid receptor agonist.

The psychoactivity of the root bark of the iboga tree, T. iboga, one of the plants from which ibogaine is extracted, was first discovered by forager tribes in Central Africa, who passed the knowledge to the Bwiti tribe of Gabon. It was first documented in the 19th century for its spiritual use, later isolated and synthesized for its psychoactive properties, briefly marketed in Europe as a stimulant, and ultimately controversially researched for its potential in treating addiction despite being classified as a controlled substance. Ibogaine can be semisynthetically produced from voacangine, with its total synthesis achieved in 1956 and its structure confirmed by X-ray crystallography in 1960. Its clinical use and development have been limited due to regulatory barriers and serious safety risks, such as toxicity to the heart.

Ibogaine produces a two-phase experience—initially visionary and dream-like with vivid imagery and altered perception, followed by an introspective period marked by lingering side effects, such as nausea and mood disturbances, which may persist for days. Long-term risks include mania and heart issues such as long QT syndrome, and potentially fatal interactions with other drugs.

Only two randomized controlled trials have been conducted on ibogaine and noribogaine for substance use disorders, and while they show preliminary anti-addictive potential, their safety and efficacy are unconfirmed, with significant risks including cardiotoxicity and fatalities. Ibogaine is federally illegal in the United States. It is used in treatment clinics abroad under legal gray areas, with growing media attention. It has inspired the development of non-hallucinogenic, non-cardiotoxic analogues like 18-MC and tabernanthalog for therapeutic use. In 2025, Texas allocated $50 million for clinical research on ibogaine to develop FDA-approved treatments for opioid use disorder, co-occurring substance use disorders, and other ibogaine-responsive conditions. A 2026 US executive order directed federal agencies to accelerate review of ibogaine.

== Use and effects ==
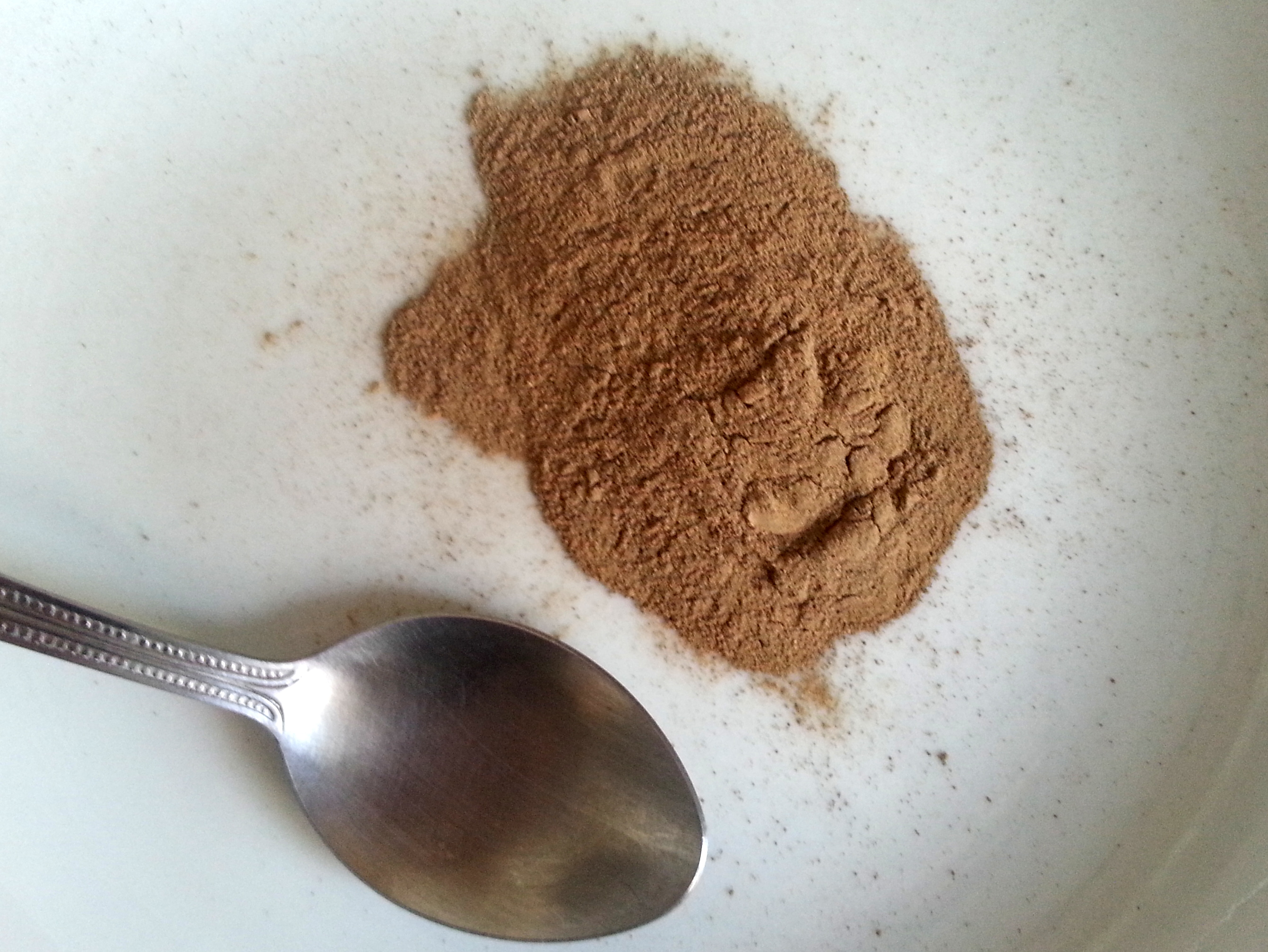
Ibogaine-containing shredded bark of T. iboga for consumption.

Ibogaine is derived from the root of Tabernanthe iboga, a plant known to exhibit hallucinogenic effects in people who consume it. It is described as having a typical dose range of 1,000 to 1,500 mg orally, with these doses producing hallucinogenic effects, and a duration of 18 to 36 hours. However, lower doses like 200 to 400 mg orally are also active and said to be hallucinogenic. In addition, very low doses of ibogaine, like 8 to 50 mg orally, have been used and reported to produce stimulant or "antidepressant" effects. The onset of the drug is 1 to 3 hours and peak effects have been described as being reached after 2 hours. With full hallucinogenic doses, ibogaine is described as having three different phases of effects. The first phase is the acute or visionary phase, which onsets after 1 to 3 hours and has a duration of 4 to 8 hours; the second phase is the evaluative or introspective phase, which starts after 4 to 8 hours and has a duration of 8 to 20 hours; and the third phase is residual stimulation, which onsets after 12 to 24 hours and has a duration of 24 to 72 hours or longer. Each of these phases is described as having distinct qualitative effects.

The visionary phase is a dream-like, conscious state called oneirophrenia. Visual effects are almost always present and are often described as films or slideshows. These may be accompanied by increases in long-term visual memory, resulting in autobiographical content. Other changes to sensation and perception may occur, including auditory hallucinations or distortions. Nausea and vomiting can be severe. Subjects may experience extreme confusion and/or a depressed mood. The visionary stage typically lasts 4–8 hours, but may last longer with especially high doses.

The introspective phase is poorly defined, often simply as 24 or 36 hours post-treatment. Sensation and perception return to normal, but nausea, headaches, and other side effects linger. Insomnia, irritability, and mood changes are often seen, including depression and sometimes mania. Depression can persist well after 36 hours, known as a "grey day"; the effect is well-recognized. A persistently low mood can progress into major depressive disorder, a chronic condition. For the treatment of opioid or alcohol addiction, the subjective experiences do not appear to be important, although they are correlated with some secondary measures (e.g., satisfaction in self-assessments).

Ibogaine has been referred to as an oneirogen (oneirophrenic or oneiric), or a hallucinogen that produces a dream-like state of consciousness. This unique altered state of consciousness is shared with harmala alkaloids like harmaline but is distinct from that of other hallucinogens like serotonergic psychedelics such as LSD or psilocybin.

== Contraindications ==
Ibogaine should not be used during pregnancy or breastfeeding.

== Adverse effects ==
There is a need for controlled clinical trials before the safety of ibogaine can be established; existing evidence, largely from uncontrolled case reports, links it to significant acute and long-term adverse events (especially cardiac issues like QTc prolongation), including fatalities. It should only be used in medically supervised settings with thorough screening and continuous cardiac and psychiatric monitoring.

Ibogaine can cause various cardiovascular changes (e.g., slowed heart rate, blood pressure shifts), neurological effects (ataxia, tremor, mania), and rare but serious complications, including arrhythmias, respiratory failure, and death, especially when combined with opioids or in patients with underlying conditions.

Cardiac risks likely occur through hERG channel blockade leading to QT prolongation and arrhythmias; the synthetic analog 18-MC appears to produce much less of this dangerous effect despite similar binding affinity.

A 2022 review found 58 ibogaine-associated emergencies, including 38 deaths. Two of these deaths occurred in the setting of clinical studies. According to a 2012 estimate, 1 in every 300 patients who take ibogaine die.

=== Neurotoxicity ===
Laboratory studies in rats indicate that ibogaine at high doses may cause degeneration of Purkinje cells in the cerebellum. This also occurred with the related drug harmaline. However, subsequent research found no evidence of this neurotoxicity with ibogaine in a primate. In limited human research, neuropathological examination revealed no evidence of neuronal degenerative changes in an adult female patient who had received four separate doses of ibogaine ranging between 10 and 30 mg/kg over a 15-month interval. A published series of fatalities associated with ibogaine ingestion also found no evidence for consistent neurotoxicity.

== Interactions ==
Ibogaine has potential for adverse interactions with other psychedelic agents and prescription drugs. It may interact with monoamine oxidase inhibitors (MAOIs), for instance due to its serotonin reuptake inhibition.

== Pharmacology ==
=== Pharmacodynamics ===
Ibogaine activities
Target	Affinity (K_{i}, nM)	Species
5-HT_{1A}	>10,000 (K_{i}); IA (EC_{50})	Human/rat; Human
5-HT_{1B}	>100,000 (K_{i}); IA (EC_{50})	Rat/calf; Human
5-HT_{1D}	>100,000 (K_{i}); IA (EC_{50})	Bovine/calf; Human
5-HT_{1E}	ND (K_{i}); IA (EC_{50})	ND; Human
5-HT_{1F}	ND (K_{i}); IA (EC_{50})	ND; Human
5-HT_{2A}	12,500–16,000 (K_{i}); IA (EC_{50})	Rat; Human
5-HT_{2B}	ND (K_{i}); IA (EC_{50})	ND; Human
5-HT_{2C}	>10,000 (K_{i}); IA (EC_{50})	Rat/calf; Human
5-HT_{3}	2,600–>10,000 (K_{i}); ND (EC_{50})	Mouse/rat; ND
5-HT_{4}	ND (K_{i}); IA (EC_{50})	ND; Human
5-HT_{5A}	ND (K_{i}); IA (EC_{50})	ND; Human
5-HT_{6}	ND (K_{i}); IA (EC_{50})	ND; Human
5-HT_{7}	ND	ND
α_{1A}–α_{1D}	ND	ND
α_{2A}–α_{2C}	ND	ND
β_{1}	>100,000	Rat
β_{2}, β_{3}	ND	ND
D_{1}	>10,000	Human/calf
D_{2}	>10,000	Human/calf
D_{3}	70,000	Calf
D_{4}	>10,000	Human
D_{5}	ND	ND
H_{1}	>10,000	Unspecified
H_{2}–H_{4}	ND	ND
M_{1}	16,000–31,600	Calf/unspecified
M_{2}	31,000–50,100	Calf/unspecified
M_{3}	12,500	Unspecified
M_{4}	ND	ND
M_{5}	ND	ND
nACh	1,050–17,000 (K_{i}); 220–5,000 (IC_{50})	Human; Unspecified
I_{1}	ND	ND
I_{2}	IA	ND
σ_{1}	2,500–9,310	Guinea pig/calf
σ_{2}	90–400	Rat/guinea pig/calf
MOR	6,920–11,040 (K_{i}); IA (EC_{50}) <5% (E_{max})	Human; Human; Human
DOR	>100,000 (K_{i}); IA (EC_{50})	Bovine; Human
KOR	3,680–3,770 (K_{i}); ~12,000 (EC_{50}); ~18–21% (E_{max})	Human; Human; Human
NOP	>100,000	Bovine
TAAR1	ND	ND
NMDA	1,010–9,800	Rat/bovine/human
SERT	549 (K_{i}); 3,037–29,000 (IC_{50}); 153,000 or IA (EC_{50})	Human; Human; Human
NET	ND (K_{i}) >100,000 (IC_{50})	Human; Bovine
DAT	1,980 (K_{i}); 20,000 (IC_{50}); IA (EC_{50})	Human; Rat; Rat
VMAT2	390–14,600 (IC_{50})	Human
OCT2	9,310 (IC_{50})	Human
VGSC	3,600–8,100 (K_{i})	Bovine/unspecified
VGCC	28,000 (IC_{50})	Unspecified
hERG	710 (K_{i}); 3,530–4,090 (IC_{50})	Human; Human
Notes: The smaller the value, the more avidly the drug binds to the site. All proteins are human unless otherwise specified. Refs:

Ibogaine affects many different neurotransmitter systems simultaneously and hence has complex pharmacology. The specific targets mediating the effects of ibogaine are not fully clear. The drug is a cyclized derivative of serotonin, and hence may be expected to have serotonergic actions, but shows relatively low affinity for serotonin receptors. In any case, it appears that the serotonin 5-HT_{2A}, 5-HT_{2C}, sigma σ_{2}, and μ- and/or κ-opioid receptors may be involved in the subjective effects of ibogaine based on animal studies. Conversely, the NMDA, serotonin 5-HT_{1A} and 5-HT_{3}, and sigma σ_{1} receptors do not appear to be involved.

Ibogaine's major active metabolite noribogaine has similar discriminative stimulus properties compared to ibogaine in rodent drug discrimination tests, but only partially substitutes for ibogaine. It appears that the stimulus properties of ibogaine may be primarily mediated by noribogaine. Noribogaine is most potent as a serotonin reuptake inhibitor. It acts as a moderate κ-opioid receptor agonist and weak μ-opioid receptor agonist or weak partial agonist. The action of ibogaine at the κ-opioid receptor may indeed contribute significantly to the psychoactive effects attributed to ibogaine ingestion; Salvia divinorum, another plant recognized for its strong hallucinogenic properties, contains the chemical salvinorin A, which is a highly selective κ-opioid agonist. Noribogaine is more potent than ibogaine in rat drug discrimination assays when tested for the subjective effects of ibogaine.

There has been uncertainty about which biological target interactions mediate the psychoactive and other effects of ibogaine. Rodent drug discrimination studies with ibogaine have been employed to help elucidate these interactions. Ibogaine partially substitutes for the serotonergic psychedelics LSD and DOM and this can be blocked by the serotonin 5-HT_{2} receptor antagonist pizotifen. Similarly, LSD and DOM partially substitute for ibogaine and this can be blocked by the serotonin 5-HT_{2A} receptor antagonist pirenperone. The serotonin releasing agent and potent serotonin 5-HT_{2} receptor agonist fenfluramine also partially substitutes for ibogaine. The preferential serotonin 5-HT_{2C} receptor agonists MK-212 and mCPP partially substitute for ibogaine as well and this can be blocked by the serotonin 5-HT_{2} receptor antagonist metergoline. The preceding findings suggest that serotonin 5-HT_{2A} and 5-HT_{2C} receptor activation are involved in the subjective effects of ibogaine. Conversely, the serotonin 5-HT_{1A} and 5-HT_{3} receptors do not appear to be involved.

Although serotonin 5-HT_{2A} receptor signaling appears to be involved in the effects of ibogaine, neither ibogaine nor its major active metabolite noribogaine appears to act as a direct serotonin 5-HT_{2A} receptor agonist. In addition, in contrast to the findings in drug discrimination studies, ibogaine fails to produce the head-twitch response, a behavioral proxy of psychedelic effects, in rodents. As such, it has been said that ibogaine does not appear to be acting primarily or exclusively as a serotonergic psychedelic and that its hallucinogenic effects cannot be ascribed to serotonin 5-HT_{2A} receptor activation. In any case, ibogaine has still been found to have significant in-vivo occupancy of the serotonin 5-HT_{2A} receptor, suggesting that it is still a ligand of the receptor.

Ibogaine has been investigated as a potential treatment for substance use disorders, with proposed mechanisms including inhibition of α3β4 nicotinic acetylcholine receptors.

The β-carbolines or harmala alkaloids bear a close resemblance to ibogaine in terms of chemical structure and subjective effects. Relatedly, harmaline and 6-methoxyharmalan fully substitute for ibogaine in drug discrimination tests, whereas harmine, harmane, harmalol, and tryptoline partially substitute for ibogaine. As with the case of ibogaine, the psychedelic DOM partially substitutes for harmaline and this further supports a role of serotonin 5-HT_{2A} receptor activation in the effects of ibogaine as well as of harmala alkaloids. However, like ibogaine, harmala alkaloids like harmaline bound to the serotonin 5-HT_{2A} receptor but were inactive as direct agonists of the receptor even at very high concentrations in vitro. In addition, whereas ibogaine and noribogaine bind to κ-opioid receptors, harmala alkaloids like harmine and harmaline show no affinity for these receptors.

Ibogaine's hallucinogenic effects not being mediated by serotonin 5-HT_{2A} receptor activation has been said to be in accordance with its hallucinogenic effects in humans being qualitatively distinct from and unlike those of serotonergic psychedelics but instead similar to those of harmala alkaloids. It is also in accordance with the fact that unlike serotonergic psychedelics like LSD, neither ibogaine nor harmala alkaloids cause pupil dilation or increase blood pressure in humans. Conversely, unlike serotonergic psychedelics, ibogaine and harmaline are said to cause balance disturbances and vomiting to a greater extent than any other psychoactive drug besides alcohol.

Ibogaine shows appreciable affinity for the NMDA receptor. However, the NMDA receptor antagonists phencyclidine (PCP) and dizocilpine (MK-801) fail to substitute for ibogaine and ibogaine fails to substitute for these NMDA receptor antagonists in rodents and/or monkeys. Hence, NMDA receptor antagonism does not appear to be involved in the subjective effects of ibogaine. Neither μ-opioid receptor agonists nor κ-opioid receptor agonists like U-50,488 substitute for ibogaine. In addition, the opioid antagonist naloxone did not substitute for ibogaine. However, naltrexone partially substitutes for ibogaine. In addition, the mixed opioid agonists and antagonists pentazocine, diprenorphine, and nalorphine partially substituted for ibogaine and this could be antagonized by naloxone. The preceding findings suggest a role of opioid receptors but not the NMDA receptor in the effects of ibogaine.

The non-selective sigma receptor agonists DTG and (+)-3-PPP partially substitute for ibogaine, whereas the σ_{1} receptor-selective agonists (+)-SKF-10,047 and (+)-pentazocine failed to substitute for ibogaine. These findings suggest a role of σ_{2} receptor signaling in the effects of ibogaine.

Induction of gamma oscillations with a profile that resembles that of REM sleep may be involved in the hallucinogenic and oneirogenic effects of ibogaine.

Noribogaine, but not ibogaine, produces psychoplastogenic effects in vitro in preclinical research. This can be blocked by the serotonin 5-HT_{2A} receptor antagonist ketanserin, by the mTOR inhibitor rapamycin, and by a TrkB antagonist.

=== Pharmacokinetics ===
Ibogaine is metabolized in the human body by cytochrome P450 2D6 (CYP2D6) into noribogaine (more correctly, O-desmethylibogaine or 12-hydroxyibogamine). Both ibogaine and noribogaine have a plasma half-life around 2 hours in rats, although the half-life of noribogaine is slightly longer than that of the parent compound. In humans, the elimination half-life of ibogaine is about 7 hours whereas the half-life of noribogaine is 24 to 50 hours. Ibogaine may be deposited in fat and metabolized into noribogaine as it is released. After ibogaine ingestion in humans, noribogaine shows higher plasma levels than ibogaine and is detected for a longer period of time than ibogaine.

== Chemistry ==
Ibogaine is a substituted tryptamine. It has two separate chiral centers, meaning that four different stereoisomers of ibogaine exist, which are difficult to resolve.

=== Synthesis ===
The chemical synthesis of ibogaine has been described.

One recent total synthesis of ibogaine and related drugs starts with 2-iodo-4-methoxyaniline which is reacted with triethyl((4-(triethylsilyl)but-3-yn-1-yl)oxy)silane using palladium acetate in DMF to form 2-(triethylsilyl)-3-(2-((triethylsilyl)oxy)ethyl)-1H-indole. This is converted using N-iodosuccinamide and then fluoride to form 2-(2-iodo-1H-indol-3-yl)ethanol. This is treated with iodine, triphenyl phosphine, and imidazole to form 2-iodo-3-(2-iodoethyl)-1H-indole. Then, using 7-ethyl-2-azabicyclo[2.2.2]oct-5-ene and cesium carbonate in acetonitrile, the ibogaine precursor 7-ethyl-2-(2-(2-iodo-1H-indol-3-yl)ethyl)-2-azabicyclo[2.2.2]oct-5-ene is obtained. Using palladium acetate in DMF, the ibogaine is obtained. If the exo ethyl group on the 2-azabicyclo[2.2.2]octane system in ibogaine is replaced with an endo ethyl, then epiibogaine is formed.

Crystalline ibogaine hydrochloride is typically produced by semisynthesis from voacangine in commercial laboratories. It can be prepared from voacangine through one-step demethoxycarbonylation process too.

In 2025, researchers at the University of California, Davis Institute for Psychedelics and Neurotherapeutics reported the total synthesis of ibogaine, ibogaine analogues, and related compounds from pyridine.

=== Analogues and derivatives ===
Analogues of ibogaine include noribogaine, ibogamine, ibogaline, tabernanthine, voacangine, coronaridine, oxa-noribogaine, and pinoline, among others.

A synthetic derivative of ibogaine, 18-methoxycoronaridine (18-MC), is a selective α3β4 antagonist that was developed collaboratively by neurologist Stanley D. Glick (Albany) and chemist Martin E. Kuehne (Vermont). This discovery was stimulated by earlier studies on other naturally occurring analogues of ibogaine, such as coronaridine and voacangine, that showed these compounds to have anti-addictive properties.

More recently, non- and less-hallucinogenic analogues, ibogalogs like tabernanthalog and ibogainalog, were engineered by scientists attempting to produce non-cardiotoxic ibogaine derivatives by removing the lipophilic isoquinuclidine ring. In animal models, both molecules failed to produce cardiac arrhythmias, and tabernanthalog failed to produce any head twitch response, suggesting psychedelic effects were absent. Other deconstructed analogues of ibogaine, such as 5-MeO-IsoqT, have also been developed and studied.

== Biosynthesis ==
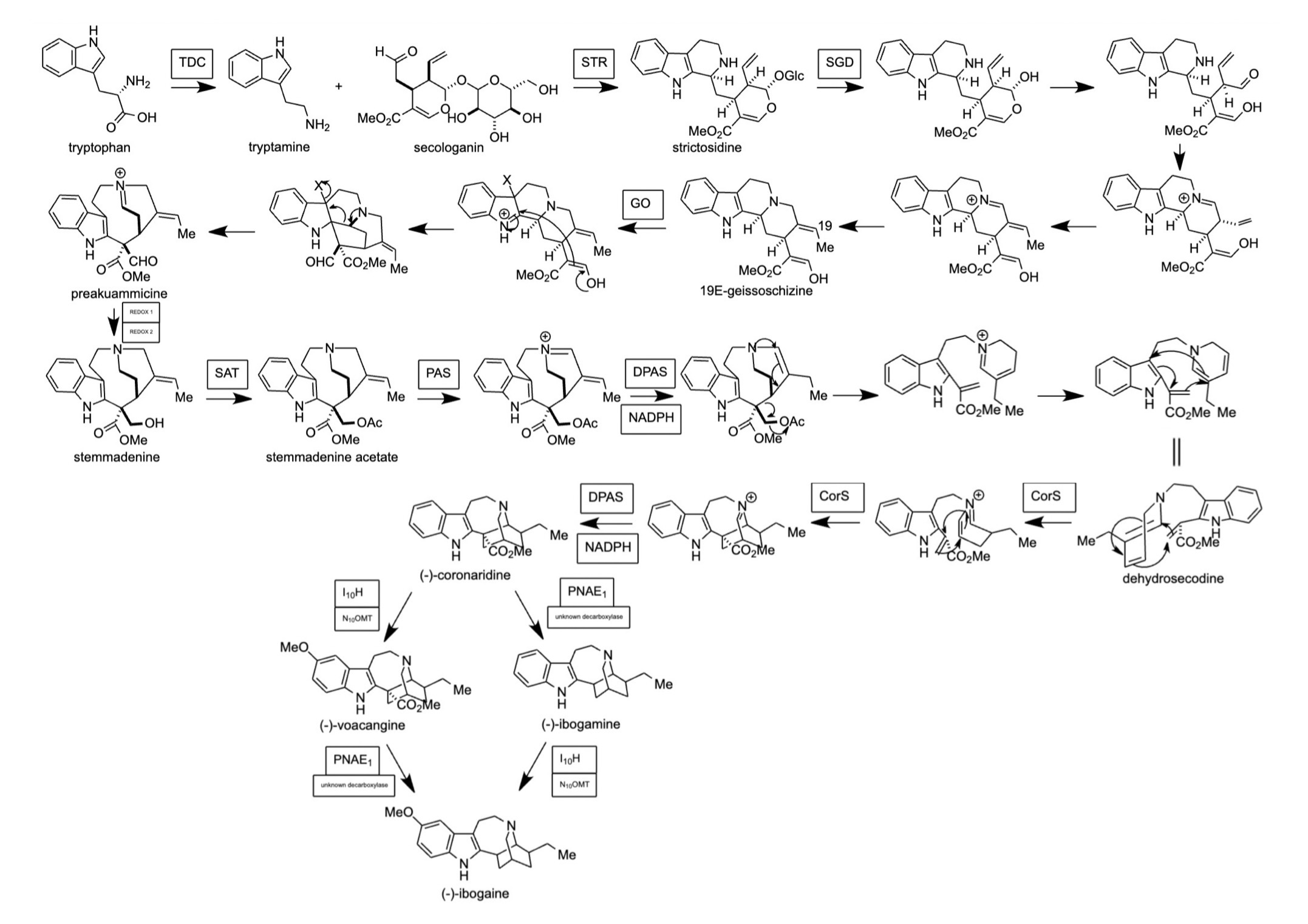
Biosynthesis of ibogaine.

Ibogaine biosynthesis begins with tryptophan undergoing enzymatic decarboxylation by tryptophan decarboxylase (TDC) to form tryptamine. Secologanin, an iridoid synthesized from isopentenyl pyrophosphate (IPP) and dimethylallyl pyrophosphate (DMAPP), is reacted with tryptamine to make strictosidine. A glycosidic bond cleavage of strictosidine by strictosidine β-deglucosidase (SGD) produces a lactol. The lactol opens and produces an aldehyde, then condenses to form an iminium. Through isomerization and reduction by geissoschizine synthase 1 (GS1), 19E-geissoschizine is yielded. The indole is oxidized, and the molecule undergoes an intramolecular Mannich reaction and Grob fragmentation to form preakuammicine. Preakuammicine is highly unstable and therefore reduced to stemmadenine by oxidation-reduction reactions (REDOX 1 and REDOX 2). Stemmadine is acylated by stemmadine Ο-acetyltransferase (SAT) to yield stemmadine acetate. Through oxidation by precondylocarpine acetate synthase (PAS) and reduction by dihydroprecondylocarpine acetate synthase (DPAS), an enamine intermediate is formed. The intermediate undergoes fragmentation to produce an iminium that tautomerizes to yield dehydrosecodine. Coronaridine synthase (CorS) catalyzes the isomerization of dehydrosecodine, and an unusual cycloaddition is completed. DPAS and NADPH reduce the iminium to form (-)-coronaridine.

There are two pathways (-)-coronaridine can take to become (-)-ibogaine. The first pathway begins with a P450 enzyme, ibogamine-10-hydroxylase (I10H), and methylation of noribogaine-10-Ο-methyltransferase (N10OMT) to produce (-)-voacangine. Polyneudridine aldehyde esterase-like 1 (PNAE1) and a spontaneous decarboxylation can convert (-)-voacangine to (-)-ibogaine. The second pathway consists of PNAE1 and the spontaneous decarboxylation occurring first to yield (-)-ibogamine, then the reaction of I10H-mediated hydroxylation and N10OMT-catalyzed O-methylation to produce (-)-ibogaine.

== Natural occurrence ==
Ibogaine occurs naturally in iboga root bark. Ibogaine is also available in a total alkaloid extract of the Tabernanthe iboga plant, which also contains all the other iboga alkaloids and thus has only about half the potency by weight of standardized ibogaine hydrochloride.

Due to environmental concerns and low levels in Tabernanthe iboga, ibogaine is often produced via semi-synthesis starting with voacangine, a naturally-occurring alkaloid in Voacanga africana.

== History ==
The use of iboga in African spiritual ceremonies was first reported by French and Belgian explorers in the 19th century, beginning with the work of French naval physician and explorer of Gabon Marie-Théophile Griffon du Bellay. The first botanical description of the Tabernanthe iboga plant was made in 1889. Ibogaine was first isolated from T. iboga in 1901 by Dybowski and Landrin and independently by Haller and Heckel in the same year using T. iboga samples from Gabon. Complete synthesis of ibogaine was accomplished by G. Büchi in 1966. Since then, several other synthesis methods have been developed.

Use of low doses of ibogaine (e.g. 10–30 mg/day) as a stimulant and "anti-fatigue" drug in the treatment of conditions like "cardiac atony", neurasthenia, and convalescence was advocated by French researchers in 1905. From the 1930s to 1960s, ibogaine was sold in France as Lambarène, an extract of the Tabernanthe manii plant, and promoted as a mental and physical stimulant. It was formulated at doses of 200 mg extract containing low doses of 4 to 8 mg ibogaine per tablet. The drug enjoyed some popularity among post-World War II athletes. Lambarène was withdrawn from the market in 1966 when the sale of ibogaine-containing products became illegal in France. Another formulation was Iperton, which contained Tabernanthe iboga extract 40 mg per dose unit.

In 2008, Mačiulaitis and colleagues stated that in the late 1960s, the World Health Assembly classified ibogaine as a "substance likely to cause dependency or endanger human health". The U.S. Food and Drug Administration (FDA) also assigned it to a Schedule I classification, and the International Olympic Committee banned it as a potential doping agent.

Anecdotal reports concerning ibogaine's effects appeared in the early 1960s. Its anti-addictive properties were discovered accidentally by Howard Lotsof in 1962, at the age of 19, when he and five friends—all heroin addicts—noted subjective reduction of their craving and withdrawal symptoms while taking it. Further anecdotal observation convinced Lotsof of its potential usefulness in treating substance addictions. He contracted with a Belgian company to produce ibogaine in tablet form with the name Endabuse for clinical trials in the Netherlands, and was awarded a United States patent for the product in 1985. The first objective, placebo-controlled evidence of ibogaine's ability to attenuate opioid withdrawal in rats, was published by Dzoljic et al. in 1988. Diminution of morphine self-administration was reported in preclinical studies by Glick et al. in 1991. Cappendijk et al. demonstrated reduction in cocaine self-administration in rats in 1993, and Rezvani reported reduced alcohol dependence in three strains of "alcohol-preferring" rats in 1995.

As the use of ibogaine spread, its administration varied widely; some groups administered it systematically using well-developed methods and medical personnel, while others employed haphazard and possibly dangerous methodology. Lotsof and his colleagues, committed to the traditional administration of ibogaine, developed treatment regimens themselves. In 1992, Eric Taub brought ibogaine to an offshore location close to the United States, where he began providing treatments and popularizing its use. In Costa Rica, Lex Kogan, another leading proponent, joined Taub in systematizing its administration. The two men established medically monitored treatment clinics in several countries.

In 1981, an unnamed European manufacturer produced 44 kg of iboga extract. The entire stock was purchased by Carl Waltenburg, who distributed it under the name "Indra extract" and used it in 1982 to treat heroin addicts in the community of Christiania, Copenhagen. Indra extract was available for sale over the Internet until 2006, when the Indra web presence disappeared. Various products are currently sold in several countries as "Indra extract", but it is unclear if any of them are derived from Waltenburg's original stock. Ibogaine and related indole compounds are susceptible to oxidation over time.

The National Institute on Drug Abuse (NIDA) began funding clinical studies of ibogaine in the United States in the early 1990s, including conducting a clinical study in 1993, but terminated the project in 1995 following the unexpected death of a female participant. Data demonstrating ibogaine's efficacy in attenuating opioid withdrawal in drug-dependent human subjects was published by Alper et al. in 1999. A cohort of 33 patients were treated with 6 to 29 mg/kg of ibogaine; 25 displayed resolution of the signs of opioid withdrawal from 24 hours to 72 hours post-treatment, but one 24-year-old female, who received the highest dosage, died. Mash et al. (2000), using lower oral doses (10–12 mg/kg) in 27 patients, demonstrated significantly lower objective opiate withdrawal scores in heroin addicts 36 hours after treatment, with self-reports of decreased cocaine and opiate craving and alleviated depression symptoms. Many of these effects appeared sustainable over a one-month post-discharge follow-up.

== Society and culture ==
=== Legal status ===
As of 2024, the legal status of ibogaine varies widely among countries, as it may be illegal to possess or use, may be legalized, may be decriminalized, or is under consideration for future legislation.

In the United States, although some cities and states have decriminalized psychedelic chemicals, plants and mushrooms, ibogaine has had minimal legislation, and remains illegal under federal law, as of 2026. The US Drug Enforcement Administration enforces ibogaine as a Schedule I substance under the Controlled Substances Act. A 2026 executive order in the US accelerates ibogaine research, regulatory review, patient access through Right to Try, and potential rescheduling if clinical trials and FDA approval criteria are successful. In March 2026, Texas announced plans to use $50 million approved by the Texas Legislature the previous year to create its own ibogaine research program after several proposals from drug companies failed to meet requirements for partnering with the state.

=== Treatment clinics ===
Ibogaine treatment clinics have emerged in Mexico, Bahamas, Canada, the Netherlands, South Africa, and New Zealand, all operating in what has been described as a "legal gray area". Costa Rica also has treatment centers. Covert, illegal neighborhood clinics are known to exist in the United States, despite active DEA surveillance. While clinical guidelines for ibogaine-assisted detoxification were released by the Global Ibogaine Therapy Alliance in 2015, addiction specialists warn that the treatment of drug dependence with ibogaine in non-medical settings, without expert supervision and unaccompanied by appropriate psychosocial care, can be dangerous – and, in approximately one case in 300, potentially fatal.

=== Media ===
==== Documentary films ====
- Detox or Die (2004). Directed by David Graham Scott. Scott begins videotaping his heroin-addicted friends. Before long, he himself is addicted to the drug. He eventually turns the camera on himself and his family. After 12 years of debilitating, painful dependence on methadone, Scott turns to ibogaine. Filmed in Scotland and England, and broadcast on BBC One as the third installment in the documentary series One Life.
- Ibogaine: Rite of Passage (2004). Directed by Ben Deloenen. Cy, a 34-year-old heroin addict, undergoes ibogaine treatment with Dr. Martin Polanco at the Ibogaine Association, a clinic in Rosarito, Mexico. Deloenen interviews people formerly addicted to heroin, cocaine, and methamphetamine, who share their perspectives about ibogaine treatment. In Gabon, a Babongo woman receives iboga root for her depressive malaise. Deloenen visually contrasts this Western, clinical use of ibogaine with the Bwiti use of iboga root, but emphasizes the Western context.
- Facing the Habit (2007). Directed by Magnolia Martin. Martin's subject is a former millionaire and stockbroker who travels to Mexico for ibogaine treatment for heroin addiction.
- Tripping in Amsterdam (2008). In this short film directed by Jan Bednarz, Simon "Swany" Wan visits Sara Glatt's iboga treatment center in Amsterdam. Current TV broadcast the documentary in 2008 as part of their "Quarter-life Crisis" programming roster.
- I'm Dangerous with Love (2009). Directed by Michel Negroponte. Negroponte examines Dimitri Mobengo Mugianis's long, clandestine career of treating heroin addicts with ibogaine.
- One of the five segments of "Hallucinogens DMT" (2012), Season 2, Episode 4 of Drugs, Inc. on National Geographic Channel, a former heroin user treats addicts with ibogaine in Canada. He himself used ibogaine to stop his abuse of narcotics.
- The "Underground Heroin Clinic" segment of "Addiction" (2013). Season 1, episode 7 of the HBO documentary series Vice examines the use of ibogaine to interrupt heroin addiction.
- The Ibogaine Safari (2014). A documentary by filmmaker Pierre le Roux which investigates the claims of painless withdrawal from opiates such as nyaope/heroin in South Africa by taking several addicts on an adventure "safari" while taking ibogaine. The documentary won the award for 'Best Documentary Short' at the 2014 Canada International Film Festival.
- Iboga Nights (2014). Directed by David Graham Scott.
- Dosed. A documentary by Tyler Chandler and Nicholas Meyers. Synopsis- After years of no success with prescription drugs, a suicidal Adrianne seeks help from underground healers with her depression, anxiety, and opioid addiction by utilizing illegal psychedelics like magic mushrooms and iboga.
- "Synthetic Ibogaine – Natural Tramadol" (2021). This episode of the documentary series Hamilton's Pharmacopeia on Vice on TV follows a struggling local addict to an ibogaine ritual.
- Lamar Odom Reborn (2022). A documentary by Mike "Zappy" Zapolin, in which famous NBA athlete (and former Keeping Up With the Kardashians star) Lamar Odom seeks out ibogaine and other therapies to heal PTSD, anxiety, and addiction.
- In Waves and War (2024). A Netflix documentary in which Navy SEALS with PTSD seek therapy using ibogaine through a program run by Stanford University.

==== Print media ====
- While in Wisconsin covering the primary campaign for the United States presidential election of 1972, gonzo journalist Hunter S. Thompson submitted a satirical article to Rolling Stone accusing Democratic Party candidate Edmund Muskie of being addicted to ibogaine. Many readers, and even other journalists, did not realize that the Rolling Stone piece was facetious. The completely unfounded ibogaine assertion did significant damage to Muskie's reputation, and was cited as a factor in his loss of the nomination to George McGovern. Thompson later said he was surprised that anyone believed it. The article is included in Thompson's post-election anthology, Fear and Loathing on the Campaign Trail '72 (1973).
- Author and Yippie Dana Beal co-wrote the 1997 book The Ibogaine Story.
- American author Daniel Pinchbeck wrote about his own experience of ibogaine in his book Breaking Open the Head (2002), and in a 2003 article for The Guardian titled "Ten years of therapy in one night".
- Author and musician Geoff Rickly based his debut novel Someone Who Isn't Me on his real-life experiences with heroin addiction and an ibogaine clinic in Mexico.
- American investigative journalist, Rachel Nuwer, published a comprehensive feature for Reason magazine titled Can This Psychedelic Help Cure Opioid Addiction? In the article, Rachel speaks with experts in the field of opioid use disorder (OUD) and how ibogaine shows promising results for effective treatment and recovery. This is particularly true for those patients who also suffer from traumatic brain injuries (TBI).

==== Television drama ====
Ibogaine factors into the stories of these episodes from television drama series:

- "Patent Pending". FBI: Most Wanted. Season 4. Episode 6. 15 November 2022. CBS.
- "Via Negativa". The X-Files. Season 8. Episode 7. 17 December 2000. Fox Broadcasting Company.
- "Getting Off". CSI: Crime Scene Investigation. Season 4. Episode 16. 26 February 2004. CBS.
- "Users". Law & Order: Special Victims Unit. Season 11. Episode 7. 4 November 2009. NBC.
- "Echoes". Nikita. Season 1. Episode 16. 24 February 2011. The CW Television Network.
- "One Last Time". Homeland (TV series). Season 3. Episode 9. 24 November 2013. Showtime.
- "Bon Voyage". Graceland (TV series). Season 3. Episode 7. 6 August 2015. USA Network.

==== Radio and podcasts ====
- "Sink or Swim. Act Two. I'm Not a Doctor, But I Play One at the Holiday Inn.". This American Life. Episode 321. 1 December 2006. — A former heroin addict realizes that he wants to help other addicts kick their habits. The problem is, he wants to do this using a hallucinogenic drug – ibogaine – that is completely illegal, and which requires medical expertise he doesn't have.
- In January 2025, former Texas Governor Rick Perry and W. Bryan Hubbard, appeared on The Joe Rogan Experience. The trio discussed advances in public policy towards ibogaine and eventual FDA clinical trials. Hubbard was the former chairman and executive director of the Kentucky Opioid Abatement Advisory Commission until he was asked to resign in December 2023. Since 2024, Hubbard has continued his campaign outside Kentucky and now works with the REID Foundation as the executive director of the American Ibogaine Initiative.

== Research ==
Ibogaine has been studied for its potential medical use in treating substance use disorders, particularly opioid addiction, by reducing withdrawal symptoms and cravings. Regulatory restrictions and serious safety concerns, including cardiac risks, have limited its clinical development.

=== Psychotherapy ===
Ibogaine was used as an adjunct to psychotherapy by Claudio Naranjo, documented in his 1973 book The Healing Journey: New Approaches to Consciousness. He was awarded patent in 1974.

=== Addiction treatment ===
A 2022 systematic review suggests that ibogaine and noribogaine show promise in treating substance use disorders and comorbid depressive symptoms and psychological trauma, but carry serious safety risks, necessitating rigorous clinical oversight. A 2023 review found that ibogaine and noribogaine show some potential in treating substance use disorders, especially opiate detoxification, but that their efficacy is unconfirmed and use carries significant cardiotoxic and mortality risks. A total of two randomized controlled trials have been conducted on ibogaine and noribogaine.

=== Texas research initiative ===
In 2025, the state of Texas allocated $50 million to fund clinical research on ibogaine, aiming to develop a U.S. Food and Drug Administration-approved treatment for opioid use disorder, co-occurring substance use disorders, and other ibogaine-responsive conditions. The initiative, supported by former Governor Rick Perry, established a consortium of universities, hospitals, and drug developers, with the goal of positioning Texas as a leading center for psychedelic medicine research.

=== Federal government initiative ===
A 2026 executive order directed US agencies to accelerate research, regulatory review, and potential patient access pathways for psychedelic drugs, including ibogaine, for serious mental illness.

== See also ==
- Iboga alkaloid
- List of investigational hallucinogens and entactogens
