= Isovoacristine =

Chemical compound

Identifiers
- IUPAC name: methyl (1S,15S,17S,18S)-17-[(1S)-1-hydroxyethyl]-6-methoxy-3,13-diazapentacyclo[13.3.1.02,10.04,9.013,18]nonadeca-2(10),4(9),5,7-tetraene-1-carboxylate
- CAS Number: 438201-17-3
- PubChem CID: 12304498
- ChemSpider: 23249593
- ChEMBL: ChEMBL360973

Chemical and physical data
- Formula: C_{22}H_{28}N_{2}O_{4}
- Molar mass: 384.476 g·mol^{−1}
- 3D model (JSmol): Interactive image
- SMILES: C[C@@H]([C@H]1C[C@H]2C[C@@]3([C@H]1N(C2)CCC4=C3NC5=C4C=CC(=C5)OC)C(=O)OC)O
- InChI: InChI=1S/C22H28N2O4/c1-12(25)17-8-13-10-22(21(26)28-3)19-16(6-7-24(11-13)20(17)22)15-5-4-14(27-2)9-18(15)23-19/h4-5,9,12-13,17,20,23,25H,6-8,10-11H2,1-3H3/t12-,13-,17+,20-,22+/m0/s1; Key:XGWIRMWTCWJZPG-ZHBRIVESSA-N

Isovoacristine is an ibogan-type indole alkaloid, primarily isolated from plants of the Tabernaemontana genus such as Tabernaemontana calcarea, Tabernaemontana divaricata, and Tabernaemontana laurifolia. It has anticholinergic and antihistaminic properties. It also has demonstrated cytotoxic effects against the A2780 ovarian cancer cell line.

== See also ==
- Benztropine
- Benzydamine
- Chlorpheniramine
