= Hirsutine =

Names
- IUPAC name Methyl (2E)-17-methoxy-3β-coryn-16-ene-16-carboxylate
- Systematic IUPAC name Methyl (2E)-2-[(2S,3R,12bR)-3-ethyl-1,2,3,4,6,7,12,12b-octahydroindolo[2,3-a]quinolizin-2-yl]-3-methoxyprop-2-enoate
- Other names 18,19-Dihydrocorynantheine

Identifiers
CAS Number	7729-23-9
3D model (JSmol)	Interactive image
ChEBI	CHEBI:70074
ChEMBL	ChEMBL327134
ChemSpider	2301518
KEGG	C16972
PubChem CID	3037884
UNII	W596OF93C7
- InChI: InChI=1S/C22H28N2O3/c1-4-14-12-24-10-9-16-15-7-5-6-8-19(15)23-21(16)20(24)11-17(14)18(13-26-2)22(25)27-3/h5-8,13-14,17,20,23H,4,9-12H2,1-3H3/b18-13+/t14-,17-,20+/m0/s1 Key: NMLUOJBSAYAYEM-AZQGJTAVSA-N; InChI=1/C22H28N2O3/c1-4-14-12-24-10-9-16-15-7-5-6-8-19(15)23-21(16)20(24)11-17(14)18(13-26-2)22(25)27-3/h5-8,13-14,17,20,23H,4,9-12H2,1-3H3/b18-13+/t14-,17-,20+/m0/s1 Key: NMLUOJBSAYAYEM-AZQGJTAVBE
- SMILES: CC[C@H]1CN2CCC3=C([C@H]2C[C@@H]1/C(=C\OC)/C(=O)OC)NC4=CC=CC=C34

Properties
Chemical formula	C_{22}H_{28}N_{2}O_{3}
Molar mass	368.477 g·mol^{−1}
- Except where otherwise noted, data are given for materials in their standard state (at 25 °C [77 °F], 100 kPa). Infobox references

Hirsutine (HSN) is an indole alkaloid isolated from Uncaria rhynchophylla and found in Yokukansan.

Its importance for medical applications was first reviewed in 2023 Hirsutine, an Emerging Natural Product with Promising Therapeutic Benefits: A Systematic Review and its findings indicate that "HSN exerts several effects in various preclinical and pharmacological experimental systems. It exhibits anti-inflammatory, antiviral, anti-diabetic, and antioxidant activities with beneficial effects in neurological and cardiovascular diseases. Our findings also indicate that HSN exerts promising anticancer potentials via several molecular mechanisms, including apoptotic cell death, induction of oxidative stress, cytotoxic effect, anti-proliferative effect, genotoxic effect, and inhibition of cancer cell migration and invasion against various cancers such as lung, breast, and antitumor effects in human T-cell leukemia."
