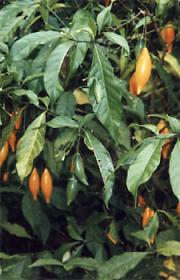
- Tabernanthe iboga

Scientific classification
- Kingdom: Plantae
- Clade: Tracheophytes
- Clade: Angiosperms
- Clade: Eudicots
- Clade: Asterids
- Order: Gentianales
- Family: Apocynaceae
- Subfamily: Rauvolfioideae
- Tribe: Tabernaemontaneae
- Subtribe: Tabernaemontaninae
- Genus: Tabernanthe; Baill.

Synonyms
- Iboga Braun-Blanq. & K.Schum; Daturicarpa Stapf

= Tabernanthe =

Genus of plants

Tabernanthe is a genus of flowering plants in the family Apocynaceae, first described as a genus in 1888. It is native to tropical central Africa.

Species

- Tabernanthe elliptica (Stapf) Leeuwenb. – Congo-Brazzaville, Zaire, Angola
- Tabernanthe iboga Baill. – Cameroon, Central African Republic, Gabon, Cabinda, Congo-Brazzaville, Zaire, Angola
