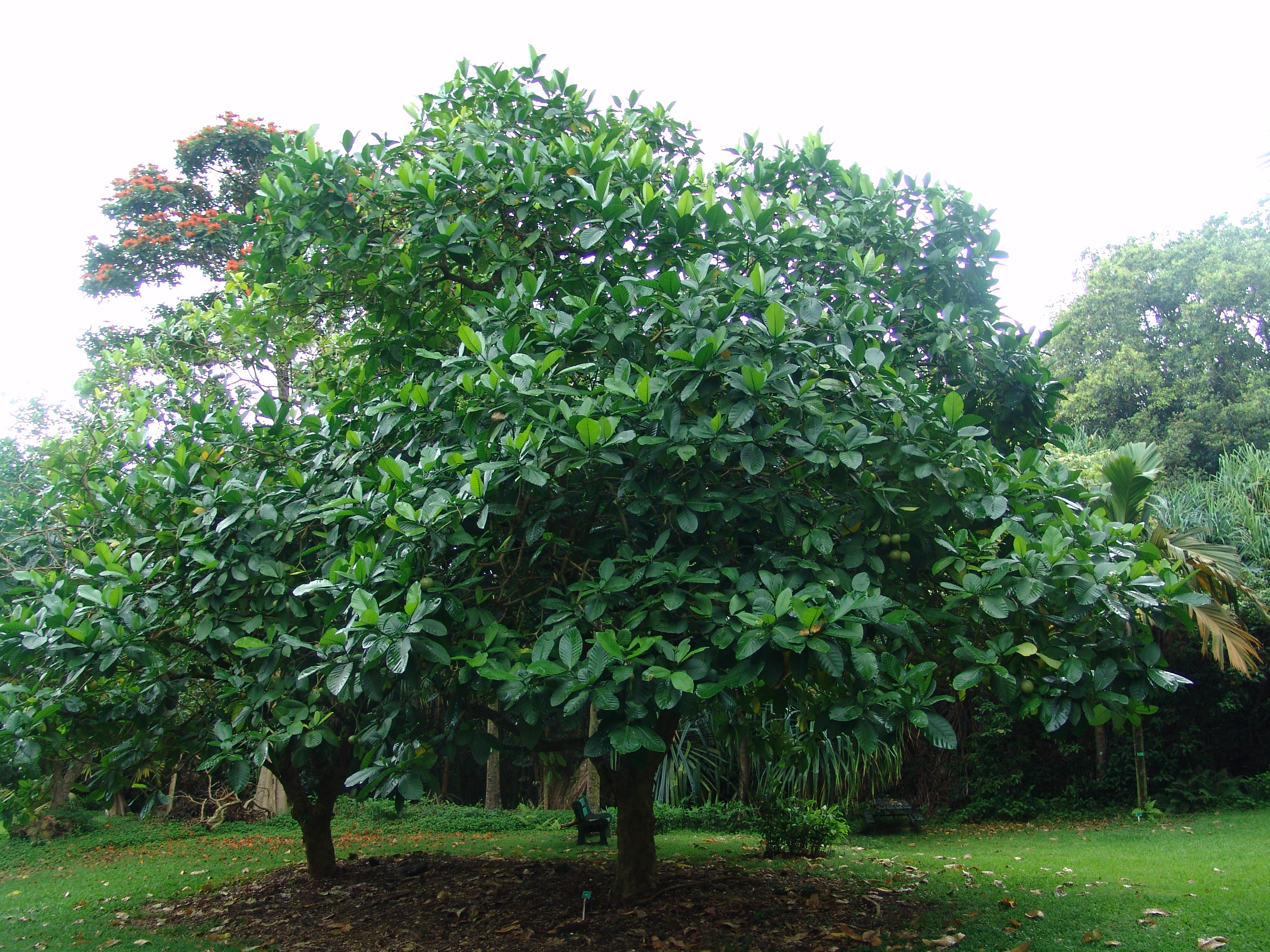

Conservation status
- Least Concern (IUCN 3.1)

Scientific classification
- Kingdom: Plantae
- Clade: Tracheophytes
- Clade: Angiosperms
- Clade: Eudicots
- Clade: Asterids
- Order: Gentianales
- Family: Apocynaceae
- Genus: Tabernaemontana
- Species: T. crassa

Binomial name
- Tabernaemontana crassa Benth.

Synonyms
- List: Conopharyngia crassa (Benth.) Stapf; Conopharyngia durissima (Stapf) Stapf; Conopharyngia gentilii De Wild. De Wild.; Conopharyngia jollyana Stapf; Conopharyngia smithii (Stapf) Stapf; Conopharyngia thonneri (T.Durand & De Wild. ex Stapf) Stapf; Gabunia dorotheae Wernham; Gabunia gentilii De Wild.; Sarcopharyngia crassa (Benth.) Boiteau; Sarcopharyngia gentilii (De Wild.) Boiteau; Tabernaemontana durissima Stapf; Tabernaemontana jollyana Pierre ex Stapf; Tabernaemontana smithii Stapf; Tabernaemontana thonneri T.Durand & De Wild. ex Stapf

= Tabernaemontana crassa =

Species of plant

Tabernaemontana crassa is a plant in the dogbane family Apocynaceae, native to tropical Africa.

== Description ==
Tabernaemontana crassa grows as a shrub or small tree up to 15 metres (50 ft) tall, with a trunk diameter of up to 30 cm (12 in). Its fragrant flowers feature white to pale yellow corolla lobes.

== Distribution and habitat ==
Tabernaemontana crassa is native to an area of tropical Africa from Sierra Leone east and south to Angola. Its habitat is forests or on coastlines from sea level to 2,000 metres (6,600 ft) altitude.

== Uses ==
Tabernaemontana crassa is used in local traditional medicine as an anaesthetic, as a haemostatic, as an anthelmintic and in the treatment of rheumatism, kidney problems, rickets and conjunctivitis. It has also been used as arrow poison.
