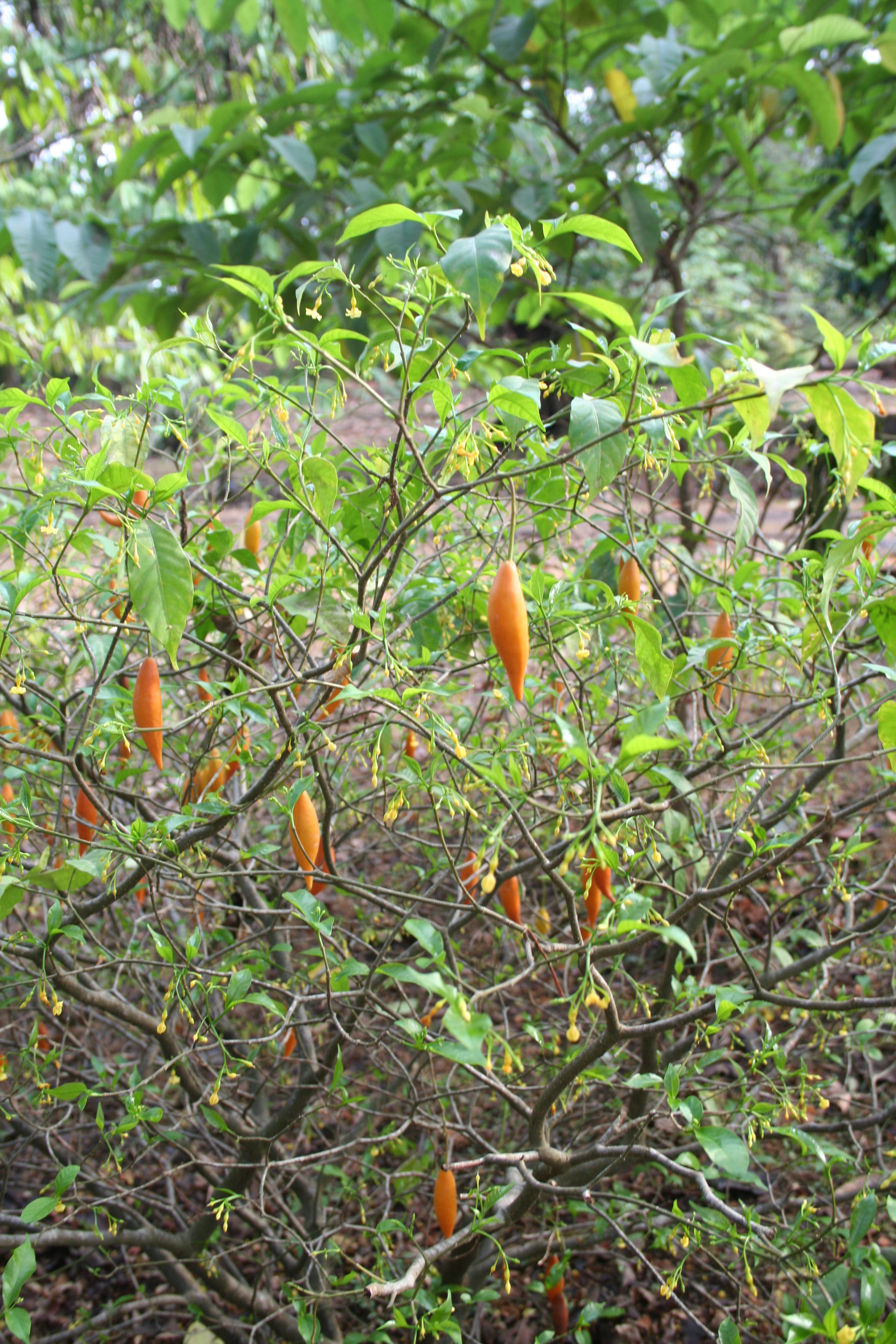

Conservation status
- Least Concern (IUCN 3.1)

Scientific classification
- Kingdom: Plantae
- Clade: Tracheophytes
- Clade: Angiosperms
- Clade: Eudicots
- Clade: Asterids
- Order: Gentianales
- Family: Apocynaceae
- Genus: Tabernanthe
- Species: T. iboga

Binomial name
- Tabernanthe iboga Baill.

= Tabernanthe iboga =

Iboga

Species of plant

Tabernanthe iboga (iboga) is an evergreen rainforest shrub native to Central Africa. A member of the Apocynaceae family indigenous to Gabon, the Democratic Republic of Congo, and the Republic of Congo, it is cultivated across Central Africa for use in traditional medicine and rituals.

T. iboga can grow up to 10 meters tall and contains psychoactive indole alkaloids, especially ibogaine, concentrated in its root bark, which produces strong neurological effects. It is used in both low doses as a stimulant and in high doses to induce intense dreamlike and hallucinatory states during rituals.

Although ibogaine has attracted interest for potential addiction treatment due to reports of reduced drug cravings, it carries a risk of potentially fatal cardiac arrhythmias. In high doses, ibogaine is considered to be cardiotoxic, and has caused serious comorbidities when used with opioids or prescription drugs. Historically documented since the 19th century, the plant has both cultural importance and controversial modern use, with unregulated clinics operating globally despite safety concerns and limited clinical evidence; meanwhile, overharvesting and slow growth raise concerns about its conservation.

The United States Drug Enforcement Administration (DEA) lists ibogaine as a controlled substance of the Controlled Substances Act.

== Description ==
T. iboga is native to tropical forests, preferring moist soil in partial shade. It bears dark green, narrow leaves and clusters of tubular flowers on an erect and branching stem, with yellow-orange fruits resembling chili pepper.

Normally growing to a height of 2 m, T. iboga may eventually grow into a small tree up to 10 m tall, given the right conditions. The flowers are yellowish-white or pink and followed by a fruit, orange at maturity, that may be either globose or fusiform. Its yellow-fleshed roots contain a number of indole alkaloids, most notably ibogaine, which is found in the highest concentration in the bark of the roots. The root material, bitter in taste, causes a degree of anaesthesia in the mouth as well as systemic numbness of the skin.

== Taxonomy ==
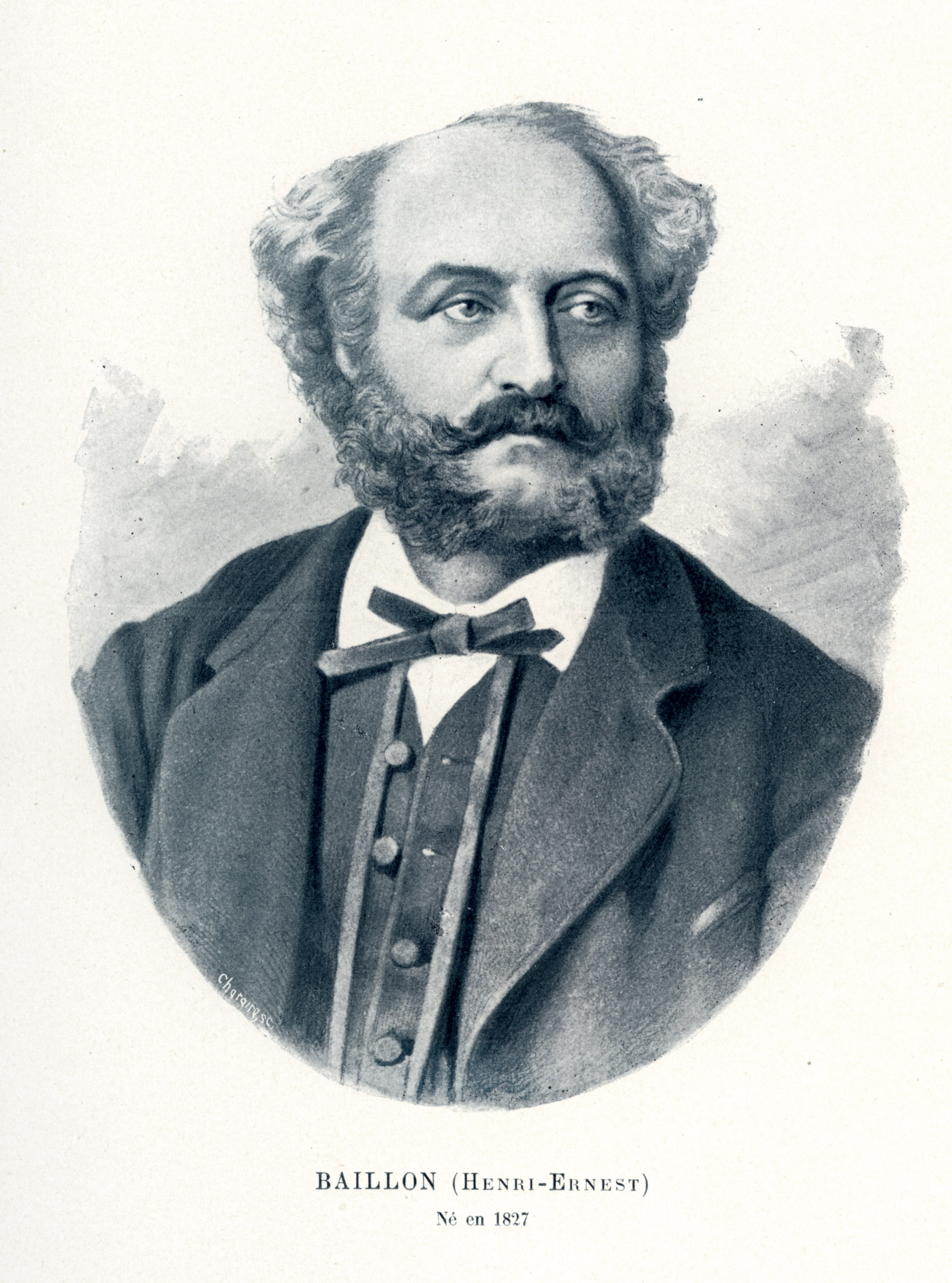
Henri Ernest Baillon, publisher of the name Tabernanthe iboga.

=== Publication of binomial ===
Tabernanthe iboga was described by Henri Ernest Baillon and published in Bulletin Mensuel de la Société Linnéenne de Paris 1: 783 in the year 1889.

=== Etymology ===
The genus name Tabernanthe is a compound of the Latin taberna, "tavern"/"hut"/"(market) stall" and Greek: ἄνθος (anthos) "flower" – giving a literal meaning of "tavern flower". On the other hand, it may equally well have been intended (by way of a type of botanical shorthand) to mean "having a flower resembling that of plants belonging to the genus Tabernaemontana " (q.v.). If the first conjecture is the correct one, the name could also have been intended to suggest that the plant is cultivated near huts, sold at market stalls or even that – like the beverages sold at a tavern – the plant is intoxicating, all of which alternatives would constitute apt descriptions of an oft-cultivated and popular psychoactive plant. The specific name iboga comes from the Myene name for the plant, which was also borrowed into a number of other regional languages with mild variation.

== History ==
The first (probable...and confused) reference to Iboga is that of Bowdich in chapter 13 of his "Mission from Cape Coast Castle to Ashantee..." of 1819

The Eroga, a favourite but violent medicine, is no doubt a fungus, for they describe it as growing on a tree called the Ocamboo, when decaying; they burn it first, and take as much as would lay on a shilling.

If this is indeed a reference to the drug derived from Tabernanthe iboga (Eroga appears to be a variant form of the names iboga and eboka) it is, of course, grossly in error in its assumption that iboga is not a plant but a fungus. Notable however is the observation of the potency of the drug – effective in small quantities. The description of the plant as growing on a tree is puzzling: Tabernanthe iboga does not usually grow as an epiphyte – if at all.

The ritual use of iboga in Africa was first reported by French and Belgian explorers in the 19th century, beginning with the work of French naval surgeon and explorer of Gabon Griffon du Bellay, who identified it correctly as a shrub belonging to the Apocynaceae – as recorded in a short essay by Charles Eugène Aubry-Lecomte on the plant poisons of West Africa, published in the year 1864.

Parmi les plantes rares ou nouvelles rapportées par le docteur Griffon du Bellay, la famille des apocynées contient encore deux poisons; l'un, nommé iboga, n'est toxique qu'à hautes doses et a l'état frais. Pris en petit quantité, il est aphrodisiaque et stimulante du systeme nerveux; les guerriers et chasseurs en font grand usage pour se tenir éveillés dans les affûts de nuit; de même que pour le M'boundou, le principe actif réside dans la racine qu'on mâche comme la coca.

[ Translation: Among the rare or new plants brought back by Dr. Griffon du Bellay, the plant family Apocynaceae contains two further poisons; the first of these, called Iboga, is only toxic in high doses and in the fresh state. Taken in small quantities, it is an aphrodisiac and stimulant of the (central) nervous system; warriors and hunters make considerable use of it in order to stay awake during their night vigils; as with the (plant) M'boundou, the active principle (of Iboga) resides in the root which is chewed like coca (leaf) ].

== Chemistry ==
Indole alkaloids make up about 6% of the root chemical composition of iboga. Alkaloids that are present in more than 1% in root bark are: (in descending order)

- Ibogaine
- Iboxygaine
- Ibogaline
- Alloibogaine
- Catharanthine
- Ibogamine
- Noribogaine
- Voacangine
- Yohimbine
- Hydroxyibogamine

18-Methoxycoronaridine, a synthetic derivative of ibogaine, also occurs naturally in this plant.

== Traditional use ==
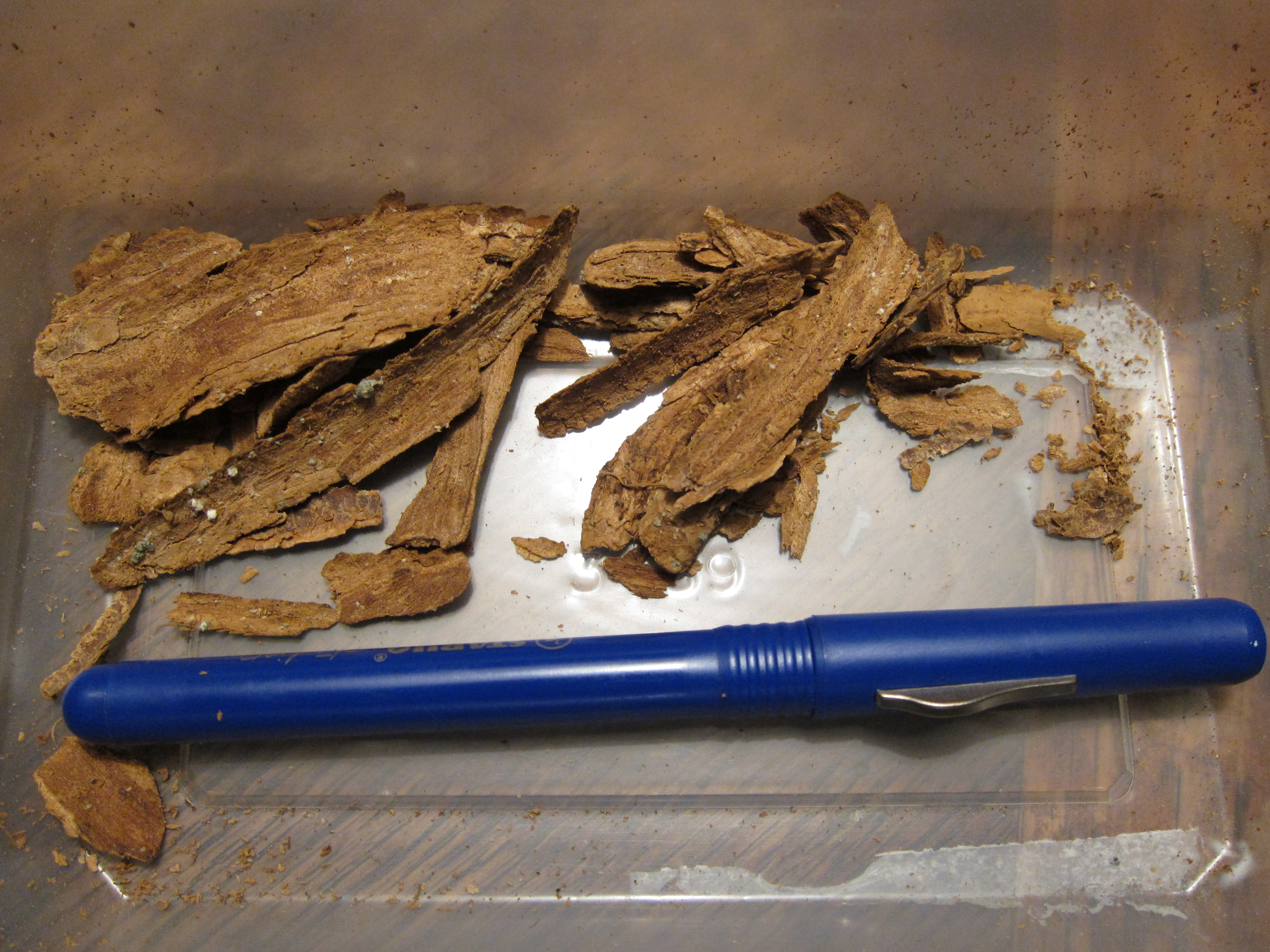
Bark of Tabernanthe iboga

The Iboga tree is central to the Bwiti spiritual practices in West-Central Africa, mainly Gabon, Cameroon, and the Republic of the Congo, where the alkaloid-containing roots or bark are used in various ceremonies, sometimes to create a near-death experience. Iboga is taken in massive doses by initiates of this spiritual practice, and on a more regular basis is eaten in smaller doses in connection with rituals and tribal dances performed at night.

While in lower doses iboga has a stimulant effect and is used to maintain alertness while hunting, in moderate or high doses, iboga induces dream-like states with vivid visions and hallucinations.

== Addiction treatment ==
Anecdotal reports of self-treated opioid addiction indicated a reduced desire to sustain opiate abuse following iboga ingestion. Since 1970, iboga has been legally prohibited in the United States following several fatalities. Iboga extracts, as well as the purified alkaloid ibogaine, have attracted attention due to potential applicability in the treatment of addiction to substances such as alcohol and opiates. Due to the cardiac safety risks of iboga, iboga analogues with improved safety profiles are a subject of research.

In the United States, ibogaine is classified as a schedule 1 controlled substance. It is not approved for addiction treatment or any other therapeutic use due to its hallucinogenic and cardiovascular side effects, as well as the absence of safety and efficacy data in human subjects. In most other countries, it remains unregulated and unlicensed.

Independent ibogaine treatment clinics have emerged in Mexico, Canada, the Netherlands, South Africa, and New Zealand, all operating in what has been described as a "legal gray area". Covert, illegal neighborhood clinics are also known to exist in the United States, despite active DEA surveillance. Addiction specialists warn that the treatment of drug dependence with ibogaine in non-medical settings, without expert supervision and unaccompanied by appropriate psychosocial care, can be dangerous – and, in approximately one case in 300, potentially fatal.

== Adverse effects ==
Ibogaine may induce nausea, vomiting, tremors, and headaches. When ibogaine is used chronically, manic episodes lasting for several days may occur, accompanied by insomnia, irritability, delusions, aggressive behavior, and thoughts of suicide, among other effects.

== Legal status ==
Iboga is outlawed or restricted in Belgium, Poland, Denmark, Croatia, France, Sweden, and Switzerland. In the United States, ibogaine is classified by the Controlled Substances Act on the list of schedule I drugs, although the plant itself remains unscheduled.

Swedish non-profit organization Föreningen för hollistisk missbruksvård engages in advocacy for clinical investigations of ibogaine's anti-addictive properties, loosening of Swedish laws prohibiting ibogaine, and the creation of treatment facilities in Sweden utilizing ibogaine.

Exportation of iboga from Gabon is illegal since the passage of a 1994 cultural protection law.

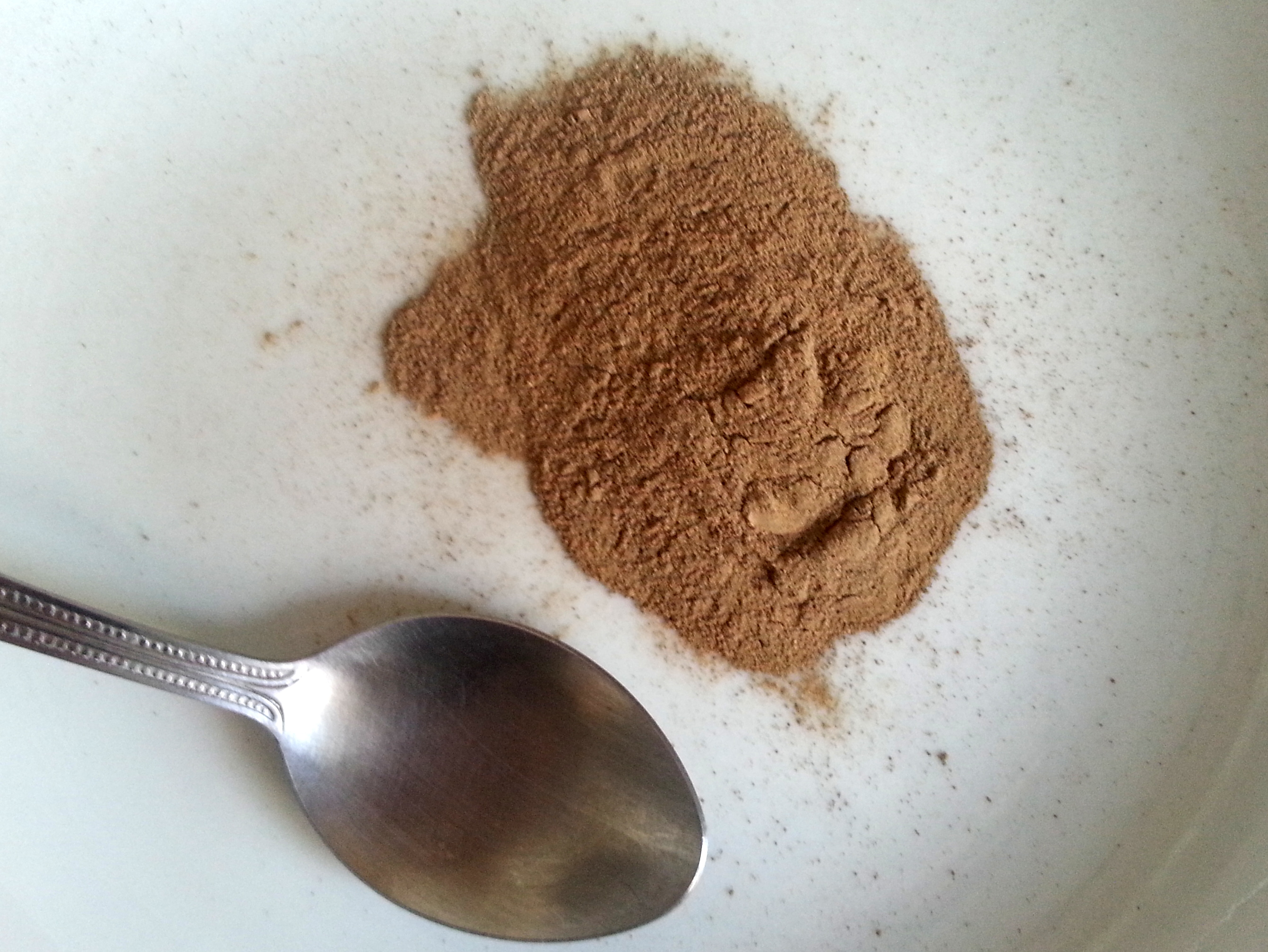
Shredded bark of Tabernanthe iboga for consumption. Contains ibogaine.

== Conservation status ==
While little data is available on the exploitation and existing habitat of the iboga plant, the destructive effects of harvesting and slow growth could have already severely damaged the wild iboga population.

== Documentary films about iboga ==
Iboga, les hommes du bois sacré (2002)
In this French-language film, Gilbert Kelner documents modern Bwiti practices and Babongo perspectives on iboga. Odisea broadcast a Spanish-dubbed version titled Los Hombres de la Madera Sagrada ("The Men of the Sacred Wood").
Ibogaine: Rite of Passage (2004)
Directed by Ben Deloenen. A 34-year-old heroin addict undergoes ibogaine treatment with Dr. Martin Polanco at the Ibogaine Association, a clinic in Rosarito, Mexico. Deloenen interviews people formerly addicted to heroin, cocaine, and methamphetamine, who share their perspectives about ibogaine treatment. In Gabon, a Babongo woman receives iboga root for her depressive malaise. Deloenen visually contrasts the Western, clinical use of ibogaine with the Bwiti use of iboga root bark, but emphasizes the Western context.
"Babongo" (2005)
In this episode (series 1, episode 4) of the English documentary series Tribe, presenter Bruce Parry ingests iboga during his time with the Babongo. BBC 2 aired the episode on January 25, 2005.
"Dosed" (2019)
This documentary depicts a woman's effort to treat her depression, anxiety, and opioid addiction using iboga and other psychedelics.
"Synthetic Ibogaine – Natural Tramadol" (2021)
In this episode (series 3, episode 4) of the American documentary series Hamilton's Pharmacopeia, presenter Hamilton Morris joins an Iboga ceremony in Gabon and later interviews Chris Jenks who shows a method to produce ibogaine from Voacanga africana.

== Gallery ==
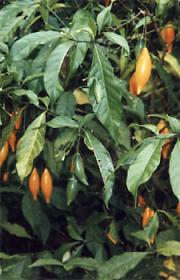
Plant in fruit: fusiform-fruited form.

== See also ==
- Entheogen
- Psychoactive plant
