= Bwiti =

Spiritual discipline of West Africa

Bwiti is a spiritual discipline of the forest-dwelling Punu people and Mitsogo peoples of Gabon (where it is recognized as one of three official religions) and by the Fang people of Gabon. Modern Bwiti incorporates animism, ancestor worship, and in some cases, Christianity, into a syncretistic belief system.

Bwiti practitioners use the psychedelic, dissociative root bark of the Tabernanthe iboga plant, specially cultivated for the religion, to promote radical spiritual growth, to stabilize community and family structure, to meet religious requirements, and to resolve pathological problems. The root bark has been consumed for hundreds of years in a Bwiti rite of passage ceremony, as well as in initiation rites and acts of healing. The experience yields complex visions and insights anticipated to be valuable to the initiate and the chapel.

== History ==
The Pygmy peoples are often cited as the origin of Bwiti, or at least of the use of iboga in a ritualistic context.

== Liturgy ==
=== Intoxicants in liturgy ===
Taking iboga brings both open and closed-eye visions which can be made stronger by darkness, ambience, and suggestion. Following the visions, users experience an introspective mindset in which they often recount past experiences in life. Difficulty sleeping, nausea, and vomiting sometimes last until the day after consumption.

=== Rites ===
Bwiti ceremonies are led by a spiritual leader called N'ganga who is a very important member of the community and has extensive knowledge of traditional healing practices, hexes, and spells. The crucial rite of Bwiti is the initiation ceremony, when young Gabonese women and men take iboga for the first time in the huts specific to each gender to become members of the spiritual practice. There are many ceremonies at different times of the year to give homage to the ancestors. Special ceremonies may be held to heal sick persons or drive out malevolent spirits.

During some ceremonies, a traditional torch made of bark and tree sap, the mupeto, is burned. Music and dance are central to the Bwiti tradition. Participants sing and play drums and shakers. Some traditions use the Ngombi harp, while other use the traditional Mongongo. The N'ganga and other participants usually dress in red, black, and white cloth. They may wear skirts of raffia material and small shells or beads. Animal skins, such as Genet fur, are often worn. The iboga root may be made into a tea or more often taken in the form of scrapings. Ceremonies usually begin at night and may last for days since the effects of doses of the drug of the size employed in such ceremonies are particularly long lasting.

==== Initiation ritual ====
The Bwiti religion originated among the Pygmies, who discovered the effects of consuming the second layer of the iboga root. Pygmies – mainly the Mbenge ethnic group in Gabon (Aka, Gyele, Bongo, Baka and Kola groups) – have observed the special effect of iboga in mountain gorillas that chewed the root. After small doses of crushed iboga root, the Pygmy hunters were able to cover a noticeably longer distance, carry a heavier load and not sleep for several days. Larger doses of iboga lead to significant hallucinations, and the dose used for the Bwiti initiation causes temporary unconsciousness. Exceeding this dose – in relation to the weight and health of the person – will cause death.

The initiation ritual is important for the Gabonese: it is during this ritual that they are initiated into the Bwiti religion and consume iboga for the first time in their lives. After successfully completing the initiation ritual, they can consume iboga throughout their life, whether during festivities, treatment, or for their personal spiritual development. The initiation ritual in Gabon usually takes three to seven days (depending on the area). The common characteristics of the initiation ritual in various areas are monotonous music with a repetitive melody, purification, vomiting, fasting, censing and receiving a drug from the iboga root. The initiation ritual is sometimes referred to simply by the name of the shrub the crushed root of which is consumed – iboga.

== Syncretism ==
In Gabon, Bwiti is practiced separately as an independent religion, but often together with Catholic Christianity in a syncretized form. Some sects are influenced by Christianity, and include the use of the Christian calendar.

== Recognition ==
Bwiti is one of Gabon's official religious traditions.

== Representation abroad ==
The term "Bwiti" is often misrepresented in the West. This is likely due to a lack of information dissemination (considering it is an oral tradition), appropriation and modification of rites among different populations, and intentional disinformation to keep rites secret.

== See also ==
- African traditional religions
- Religion in Gabon
- Beti-Pahuin peoples
- Winti
- Ibogaine
