= Tabernanthine =

Chemical compound

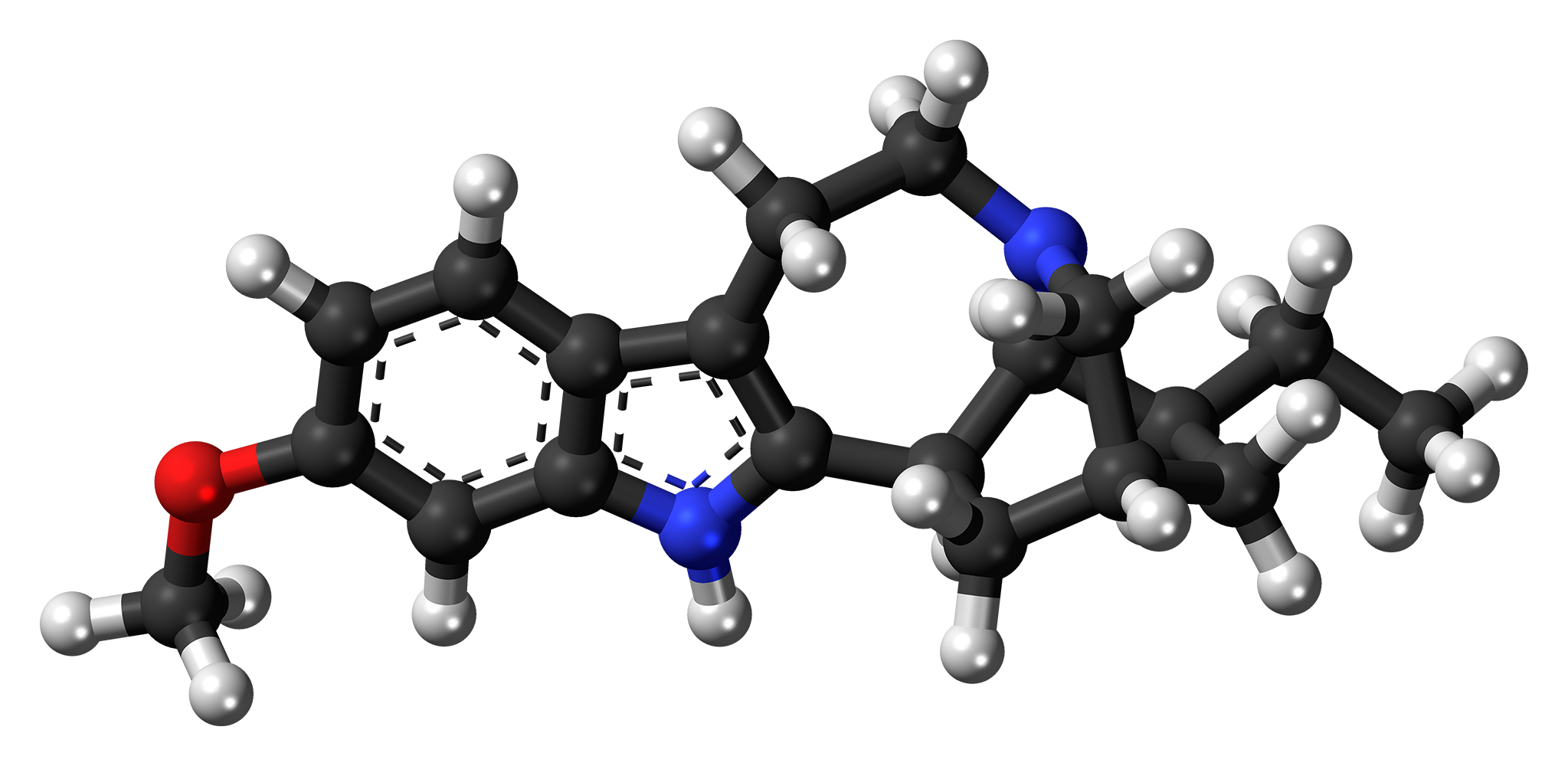

Clinical data
- ATC code: none

Identifiers
- IUPAC name: (1R,15R,17S,18S)-17-Ethyl-6-methoxy-3,13-diazapentacyclo[13.3.1.0^{2,10}.0^{4,9}.0^{13,18}]nonadeca-2(10),4(9),5,7-tetraene
- CAS Number: 83-94-3
- PubChem CID: 6326116
- ChemSpider: 4885254
- UNII: TV52I1S16D
- CompTox Dashboard (EPA): DTXSID50878514

Chemical and physical data
- Formula: C_{20}H_{26}N_{2}O
- Molar mass: 310.441 g·mol^{−1}
- 3D model (JSmol): Interactive image
- SMILES: CCC1CC2CC3C1N(C2)CCC4=C3NC5=C4C=CC(=C5)OC
- InChI: InChI=1S/C20H26N2O/c1-3-13-8-12-9-17-19-16(6-7-22(11-12)20(13)17)15-5-4-14(23-2)10-18(15)21-19/h4-5,10,12-13,17,20-21H,3,6-9,11H2,1-2H3/t12-,13+,17+,20+/m1/s1; Key:UCIDWKVIQZIKEK-CFDPKNGZSA-N

Tabernanthine is an alkaloid found in Tabernanthe iboga. It has been used in laboratory experiments to study how addiction affects the brain. Tabernanthine persistently reduced the self-administration of cocaine and morphine in rats.

== Pharmacology ==
It is kappa opioid agonist (K_{i} = 0.15 μM) and NMDA receptor (K_{i} = 10.5 μM) antagonist. Compared to ibogaine, it binds weakly to σ_{1} and σ_{2} receptors.

== See also ==
- Coronaridine
- Ibogamine
- Voacangine
- Tabernaemontanine
- Tabernanthalog
