= Coronaridine =

Chemical compound

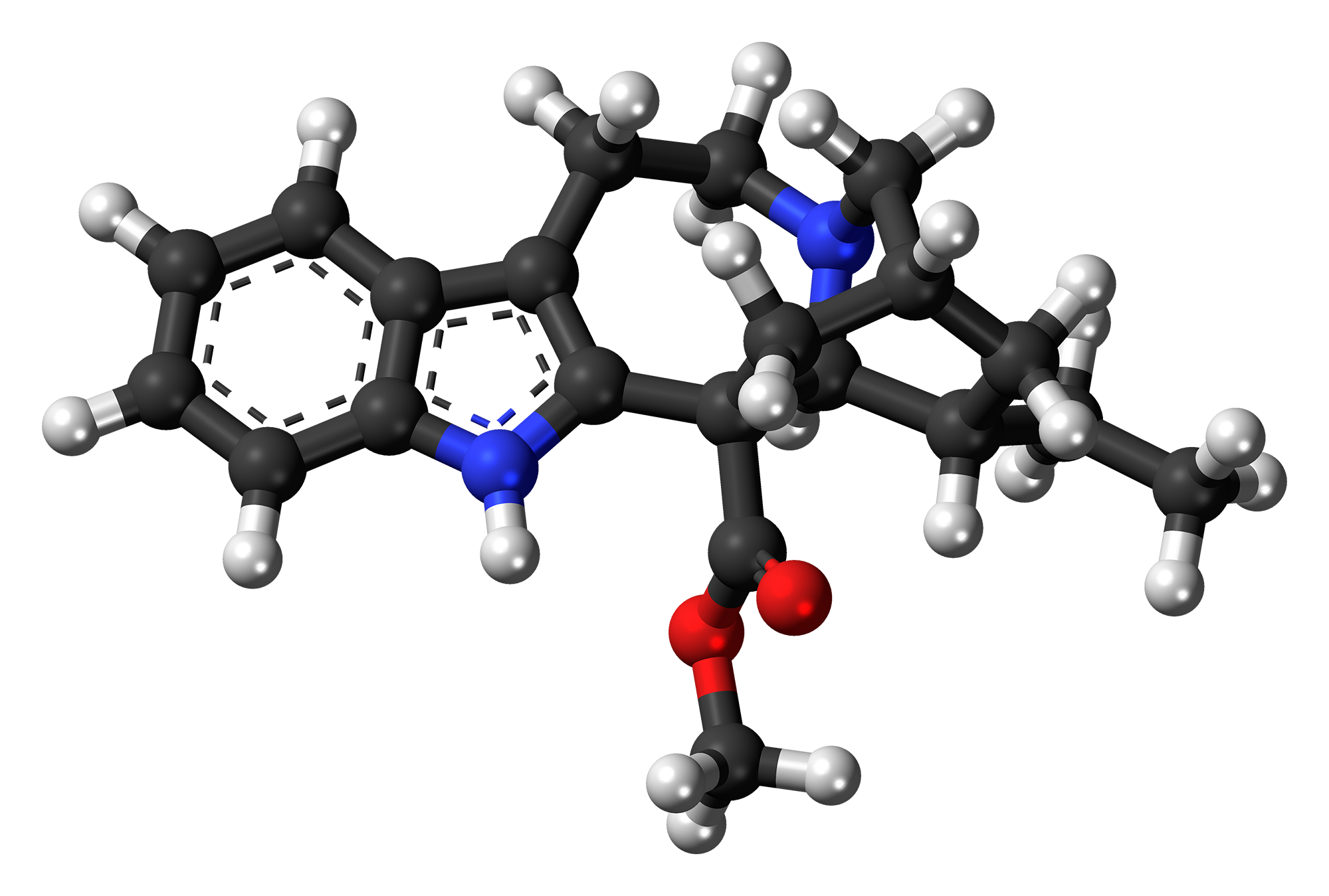

Clinical data
- ATC code: none

Identifiers
- IUPAC name: Methyl (1S,15R,17S,18S)-17-ethyl-3,13-diazapentacyclo[13.3.1.0^{2,10}.0^{4,9}.0^{13,18}]nonadeca-2(10),4,6,8-tetraene-1-carboxylate
- CAS Number: 467-77-6
- PubChem CID: 6426909
- ChemSpider: 4932328
- ChEBI: CHEBI:3887
- CompTox Dashboard (EPA): DTXSID60963642
- ECHA InfoCard: 100.006.727

Chemical and physical data
- Formula: C_{21}H_{26}N_{2}O_{2}
- Molar mass: 338.451 g·mol^{−1}
- 3D model (JSmol): Interactive image
- SMILES: CCC1CC2CC3(C1N(C2)CCC4=C3NC5=CC=CC=C45)C(=O)OC
- InChI: InChI=1S/C21H26N2O2/c1-3-14-10-13-11-21(20(24)25-2)18-16(8-9-23(12-13)19(14)21)15-6-4-5-7-17(15)22-18/h4-7,13-14,19,22H,3,8-12H2,1-2H3/t13-,14+,19+,21-/m1/s1; Key:NVVDQMVGALBDGE-PZXGUROGSA-N

Coronaridine, also known as 18-carbomethoxyibogamine, is an alkaloid found in Tabernanthe iboga and related species, including Tabernaemontana divaricata for which (under the now obsolete synonym Ervatamia coronaria) it was named.

Like ibogaine, (R)-coronaridine and (S)-coronaridine can decrease intake of cocaine and morphine in animals and it may have muscle relaxant and hypotensive activity.

== Chemistry ==
=== Congeners ===
Coronaridine congeners are important in drug discovery and development due to multiple actions on different targets. They have ability to inhibit Ca_{v}2.2 channel, modulate and inhibit subunits of nAChr selectively such as α9α10, α3β4 and potentiate GABA_{A} activity.

== Pharmacology ==
Coronaridine has been reported to bind to an assortment of molecular sites, including: μ-opioid (K_{i} = 2.0 μM), δ-opioid (K_{i} = 8.1 μM), and κ-opioid receptors (K_{i} = 4.3 μM), NMDA receptor (K_{i} = 6.24 μM) (as an antagonist), and nAChRs (as an antagonist). It has also been found to inhibit the enzyme acetylcholinesterase, act as a voltage-gated sodium channel blocker, and displays estrogenic activity in rodents. In contrast to ibogaine and other iboga alkaloids, coronaridine does not bind to either the σ_{1} or σ_{2} receptor.

== Sources ==
Plant sources
Family	Plants
Apocynaceae	T. catharinensis, T. ternifolia, T. pandacaqui, T. heyneana, T. litoralis, T. divaricata, T. penduliflora.

== See also ==
- Dregamine
- Ibogaine
- Ibogamine
- Tabernanthine
- Voacangine
