= Ibogamine =

Anti-convulsant, anti-addictive CNS stimulant alkaloid

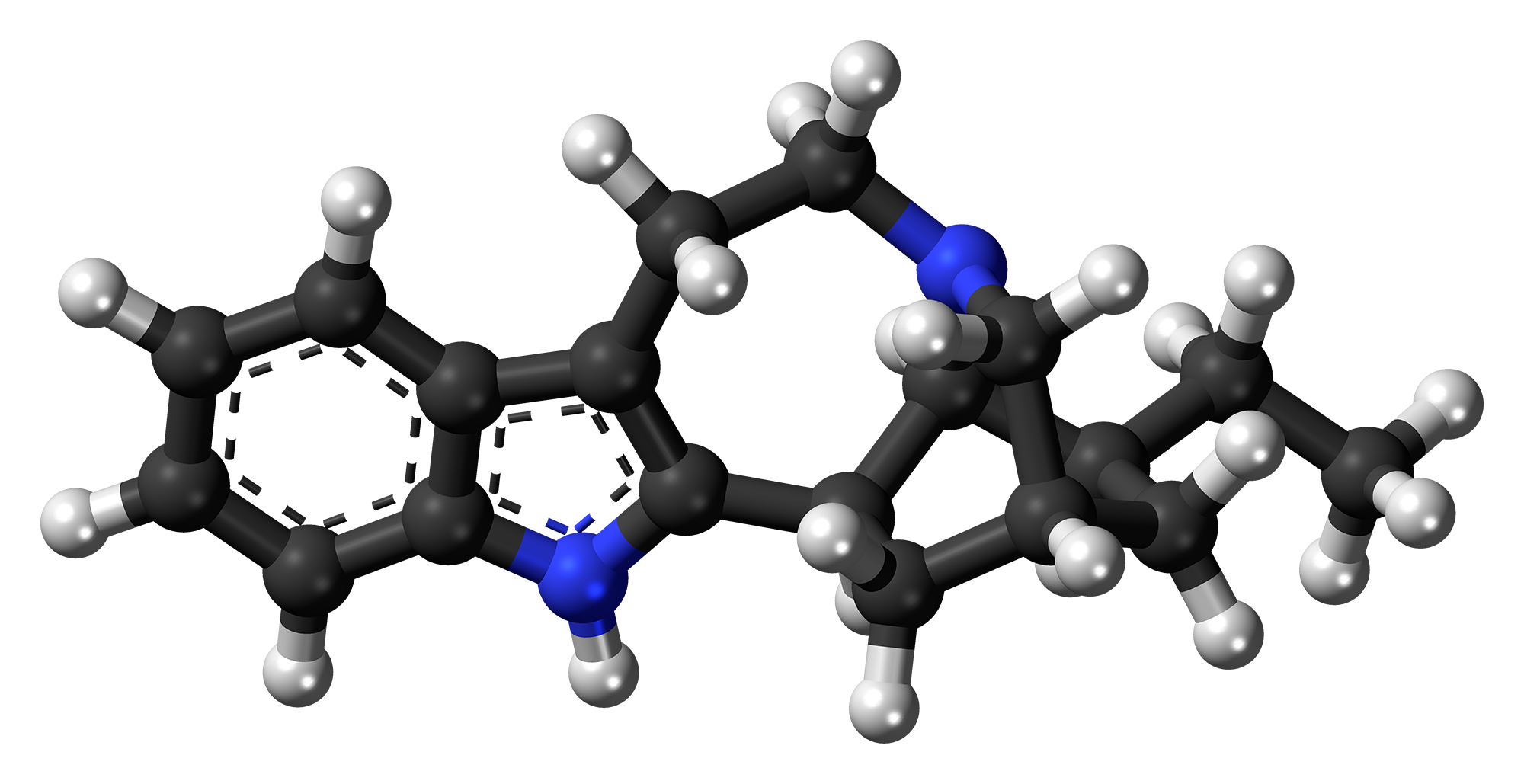

Clinical data
- ATC code: none

Identifiers
- IUPAC name: [6R-(6α,6aβ,7β,9α)]-7-ethyl-6,6a,7,8,9,10,12,13-octahydro-6,9-methano-5H-pyrido[1',2':1,2]azepino[4,5-b]indole
- CAS Number: 481-87-8
- PubChem CID: 100217
- ChemSpider: 90568
- ChEBI: CHEBI:5853
- CompTox Dashboard (EPA): DTXSID30963997

Chemical and physical data
- Formula: C_{19}H_{24}N_{2}
- Molar mass: 280.415 g·mol^{−1}
- 3D model (JSmol): Interactive image
- SMILES: CC[C@H]1C[C@@H]2C[C@@H]3[C@H]1N(C2)CCC4=C3NC5=CC=CC=C45
- InChI: InChI=1S/C19H24N2/c1-2-13-9-12-10-16-18-15(7-8-21(11-12)19(13)16)14-5-3-4-6-17(14)20-18/h3-6,12-13,16,19-20H,2,7-11H2,1H3/t12-,13+,16+,19+/m1/s1; Key:LRLCVRYKAFDXKU-YGOSVGOTSA-N

Ibogamine is an anti-convulsant, anti-addictive, CNS stimulant alkaloid found in Tabernanthe iboga and Crepe Jasmine (Tabernaemontana divaricata). Basic research related to how addiction affects the brain has used this chemical.

== Pharmacology ==
Like ibogaine, it has seems to have similar pharmacology. It has effects on KOR, NMDAR, nAChR and serotonin sites. It also inhibits acetylcholinesterase and butyrylcholinesterase.

Ibogamine persistently reduced the self-administration of cocaine and morphine in rats. The same study found that ibogamine (40 mg/kg) and coronaridine (40 mg/kg) did not produce "any tremor effects in rats that differ significantly from saline control". While the related alkaloids ibogaine (20–40 mg/kg), harmaline (10–40 mg/kg) and desethylcoronaridine (10–40 mg/kg) were "obviously tremorgenic".

== Chemistry ==
=== Synthesis ===
Ibogamine can be prepared from one-step demethoxycarbonylation process through coronaridine.

== See also ==
- Coronaridine
- Ibogaine
- Ibogaline
- Tabernanthine
- Voacangine
- Ibogaminalog
- Harmaline
