= Voacangine =

- Stereo structural formula of voacangine

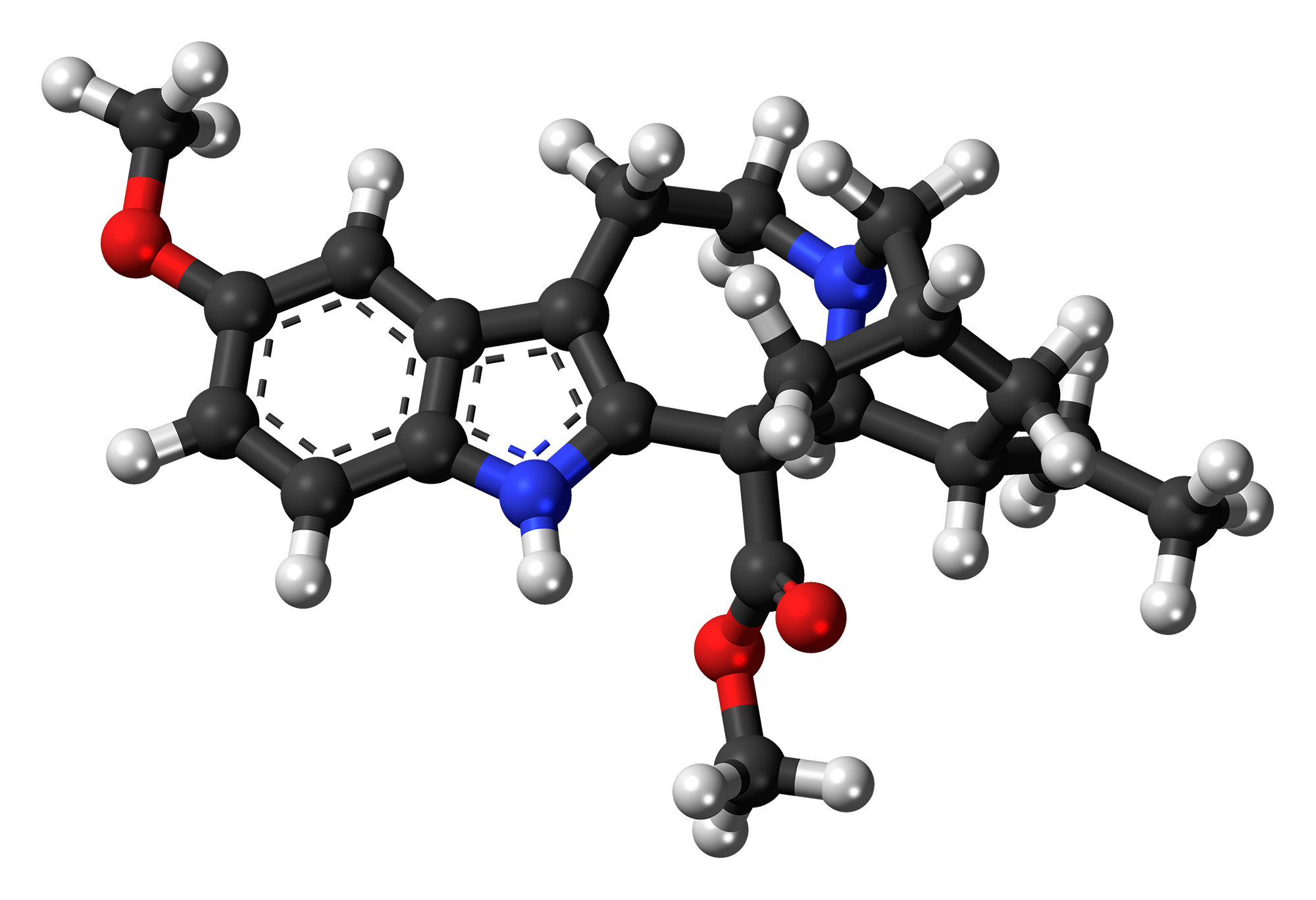
- Ball-and-stick model of the voacangine molecule

Names
- IUPAC name 12-Methoxyibogamine-18-carboxylic acid, methyl ester
- Systematic IUPAC name Methyl 17-ethyl-7-methoxy-3,13-diazapentacyclo[13.3.1.0^{2,10}.0^{4,9}.0^{13,18}] nonadeca-2(10),4,6,8-tetraene-1-carboxylate
- Other names Methyl 12-methoxyibogamine-18-carboxylate

Identifiers
CAS Number	510-22-5
3D model (JSmol)	Interactive image
ChEBI	CHEBI:141966
ChEMBL	ChEMBL182120
ChemSpider	8537141
ECHA InfoCard	100.214.137
MeSH	Voacangine
PubChem CID	73255
UNII	9SY76D3YUK
CompTox Dashboard (EPA)	DTXSID50965276
- InChI: InChI=1S/C22H28N2O3/c1-4-14-9-13-11-22(21(25)27-3)19-16(7-8-24(12-13)20(14)22)17-10-15(26-2)5-6-18(17)23-19/h5-6,10,13-14,20,23H,4,7-9,11-12H2,1-3H3/t13-,14+,20+,22-/m1/s1 Key: MMAYTCMMKJYIAM-PHKAQXKASA-N
- SMILES: O=C(OC)[C@@]43c2[nH]c1ccc(OC)cc1c2CCN5[C@H]3[C@H](C[C@H](C4)C5)CC

Properties
Chemical formula	C_{22}H_{28}N_{2}O_{3}
Molar mass	368.477 g·mol^{−1}
Melting point	136 to 137 °C (277 to 279 °F; 409 to 410 K)
log P	3.748
- Except where otherwise noted, data are given for materials in their standard state (at 25 °C [77 °F], 100 kPa). verify (what is ?) Infobox references

Voacangine (12-methoxyibogamine-18-carboxylic acid methyl ester) is an alkaloid found predominantly in the root bark of the Voacanga africana tree, as well as in other plants such as Tabernanthe iboga, Tabernaemontana africana, Trachelospermum jasminoides, Tabernaemontana divaricata and Ervatamia yunnanensis. It is an iboga alkaloid which commonly serves as a precursor for the semi-synthesis of ibogaine. Under UV-A and UV-B light its crystals fluoresce blue-green, and it is soluble in ethanol.

== Pharmacology ==
=== Pharmacodynamics ===
Voacangine exhibits AChE inhibitory activity. Docking simulation reveals that it has inhibitory effect on VEGF2 kinase and reduces angiogenesis. Like ibogaine, its a potent HERG blocker in vitro. It also acts as antagonist to TRPM8 and TRPV1 receptor, but agonist of TRPA1.

=== Pharmacokinetics ===
The absolute bioavailability of voacangine is around 11–13%.

== Side effects ==
High doses of voacangine produce convulsions and asphyxia.

== Chemistry ==
=== Biosynthesis ===
The late-stage biosynthesis of (-)-voacangine in Tabernanthe iboga, a (-)-ibogamine-type alkaloid, has been elucidated via homology-guided transcriptome mining. Suspected RNA transcripts involved in (-)-voacangine biosynthesis were identified via sequence homology to previously described enzymes comprising the (+)-catharanthine biosynthesis, a (+)-ibogamine-type alkaloid from the taxonomically related plant Catharanthus roseus.

Ibogamine-type alkaloids are biosynthesized from the late stage intermediate stemmadenine acetate, a strictosidine-derived biosynthetic intermediate for a wide number of plant natural products. The biosynthesis of stemmadenine acetate has been characterized in C. roseus but remains uncharacterized in T. iboga.

Schematic of the late-stage biosynthesis of (-)-voacangine in Tabernanthe iboga

Conversion of stemmadenine acetate to (-)-voacangine in T. iboga involves five enzymes. First, stemmadenine acetate (1) is converted to precondylocarpine acetate (2) by one of three T. iboga precondylocarpine acetate synthases (TiPAS1/2/3), a flavin-dependent oxidase. Next, 2 is reduced to the enamine (3), dihydroprecondylocarpine acetate, by one of two NADPH-dependent T. iboga dihydroprecondylocarpine acetate synthase (TiDPAS1/2).

Up to this point, the biosynthetic path towards the (-)-ibogamine alkaloids and (+)-ibogamine alkaloids is identical. Stereochemical divergence occurs during the cyclization step, whereby T. iboga coronaridine synthase (TiCorS), a catharanthine synthase (CS) homologue, catalyzes a stereoselective formal Diels-Alder reaction on dehydrosecodine (4) to form coronaridine iminium (5). A proposed mechanism for dehydrosecodine formation from 3 involves iminium-formation/deacetylation, enamine-formation, and subsequent isomerization. Reduction of 5 to (-)-coronaridine (6) is proposed to be catalyzed by TiDPAS, although it is unclear if the reduction is actually enzymatic due to a lack of a reaction trial with only NADPH. (Note: See supplementary figure 15 of the Farrow et al. paper, citation 18. After initial incubation with TiCorS, no trial was run with just NADPH.) After formation of 6, the substrate is then 10-hydroxylated by ibogamine 10-hydroxylase (I10H), a CYP450 enzyme, and subsequently 10-O-methylated by noribogaine-10-O-methyltransferase (N10OMT), a SAM dependent enzyme, to form (-)-voacangine (7).

== See also ==
- 18-Methoxycoronaridine
- Coronaridine
- Ibogaine
- Noribogaine
- Voacamine
