= C21H24N2O4 =

The molecular formula C_{21}H_{24}N_{2}O_{4} may refer to:

- Carmoterol
- Cyclarbamate, also known as cyclopentaphene
- Mitraphylline
- Vincoline
