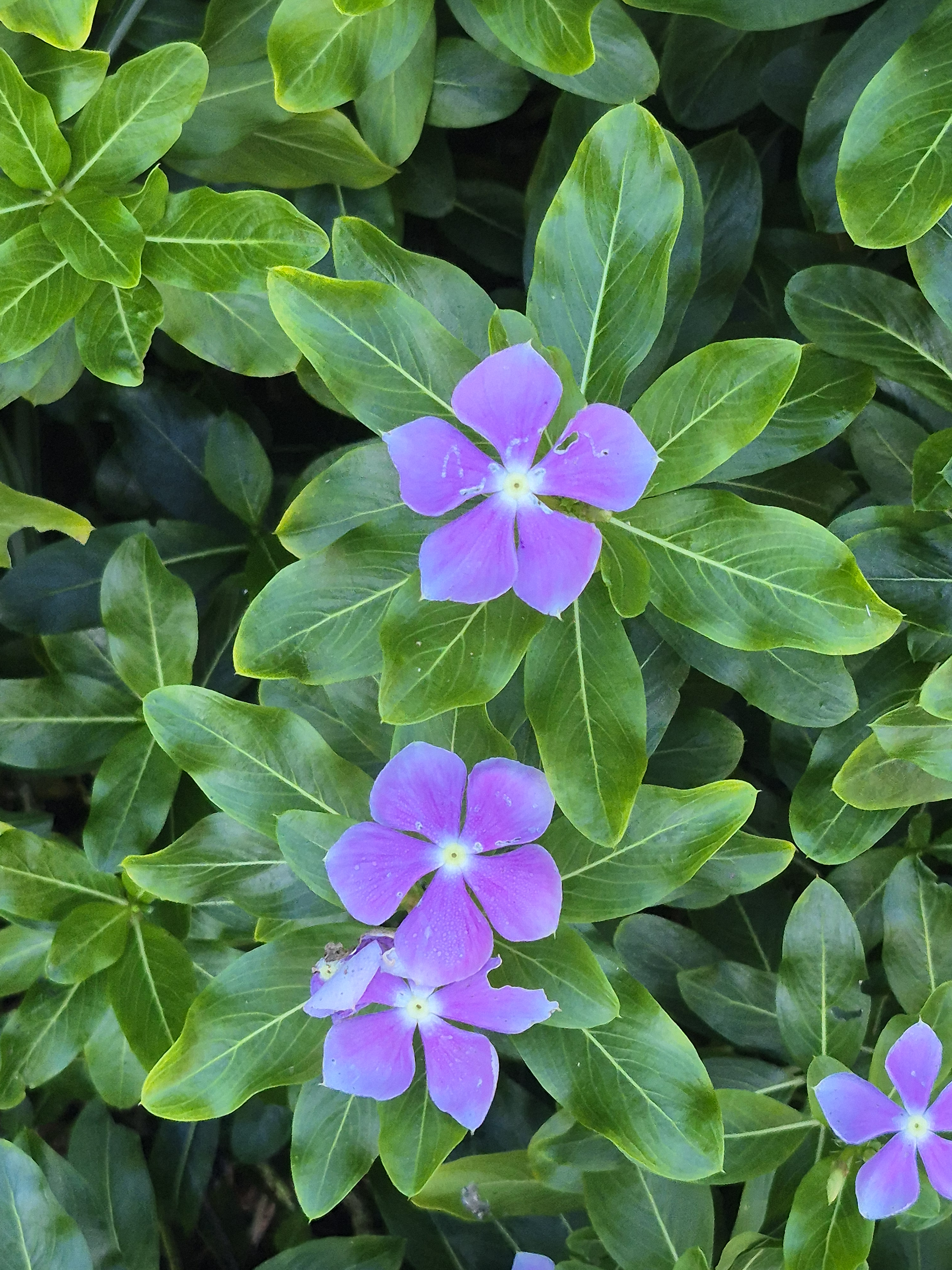
- Flowers and leaves of specimen cultivated in Brazil

Scientific classification
- Kingdom: Plantae
- Clade: Embryophytes
- Clade: Tracheophytes
- Clade: Spermatophytes
- Clade: Angiosperms
- Clade: Eudicots
- Clade: Asterids
- Order: Gentianales
- Family: Apocynaceae
- Genus: Catharanthus
- Species: C. roseus

Binomial name
- Catharanthus roseus (L.) G.Don

Synonyms
- Vinca rosea L.; Pervinca rosea (L.) Gaterau; Lochnera rosea (L.) Rchb. ex Spach; Ammocallis rosea (L.) Small

= Catharanthus roseus =

Species of flowering plant in the family Apocynaceae

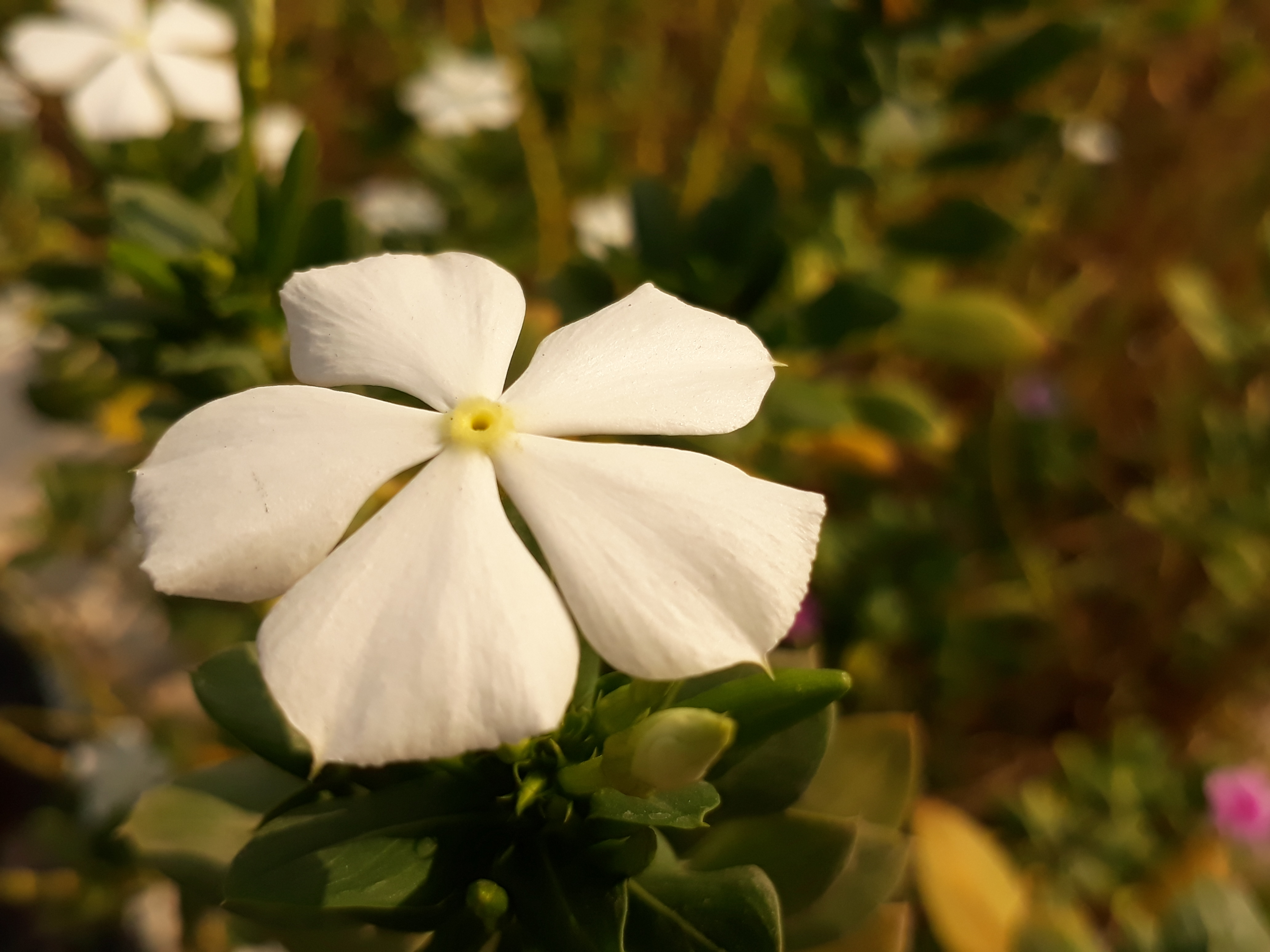

Catharanthus roseus, commonly known as bright eyes, Cape periwinkle, graveyard plant, Madagascar periwinkle, old maid, pink periwinkle, rose periwinkle, is a perennial species of flowering plant in the family Apocynaceae. It is native and endemic to Madagascar, but is grown elsewhere as an ornamental and medicinal plant, and now has a pantropical distribution. It is a source of the drugs vincristine and vinblastine, used to treat cancer. It was formerly included in the genus Vinca as Vinca rosea.

It has many vernacular names among which are arivotaombelona or rivotambelona, tonga, tongatse or trongatse, tsimatiririnina, and vonenina.

== Taxonomy ==
Two varieties are recognized:

- Catharanthus roseus var. roseus

Synonymy for this variety

Catharanthus roseus var. angustus Steenis ex Bakhuizen F.
Catharanthus roseus var. albus G.Don
Catharanthus roseus var. occellatus G.Don
Catharanthus roseus var. nanus Markgr.
Lochnera rosea f. alba (G.Don) Woodson
Lochnera rosea var. ocellata (G.Don) Woodson

- Catharanthus roseus var. angustus (Steenis) Bakh. f.

Synonymy for this variety

Catharanthus roseus var. nanus Markgr.
Lochnera rosea var. angusta Steenis

== Description ==
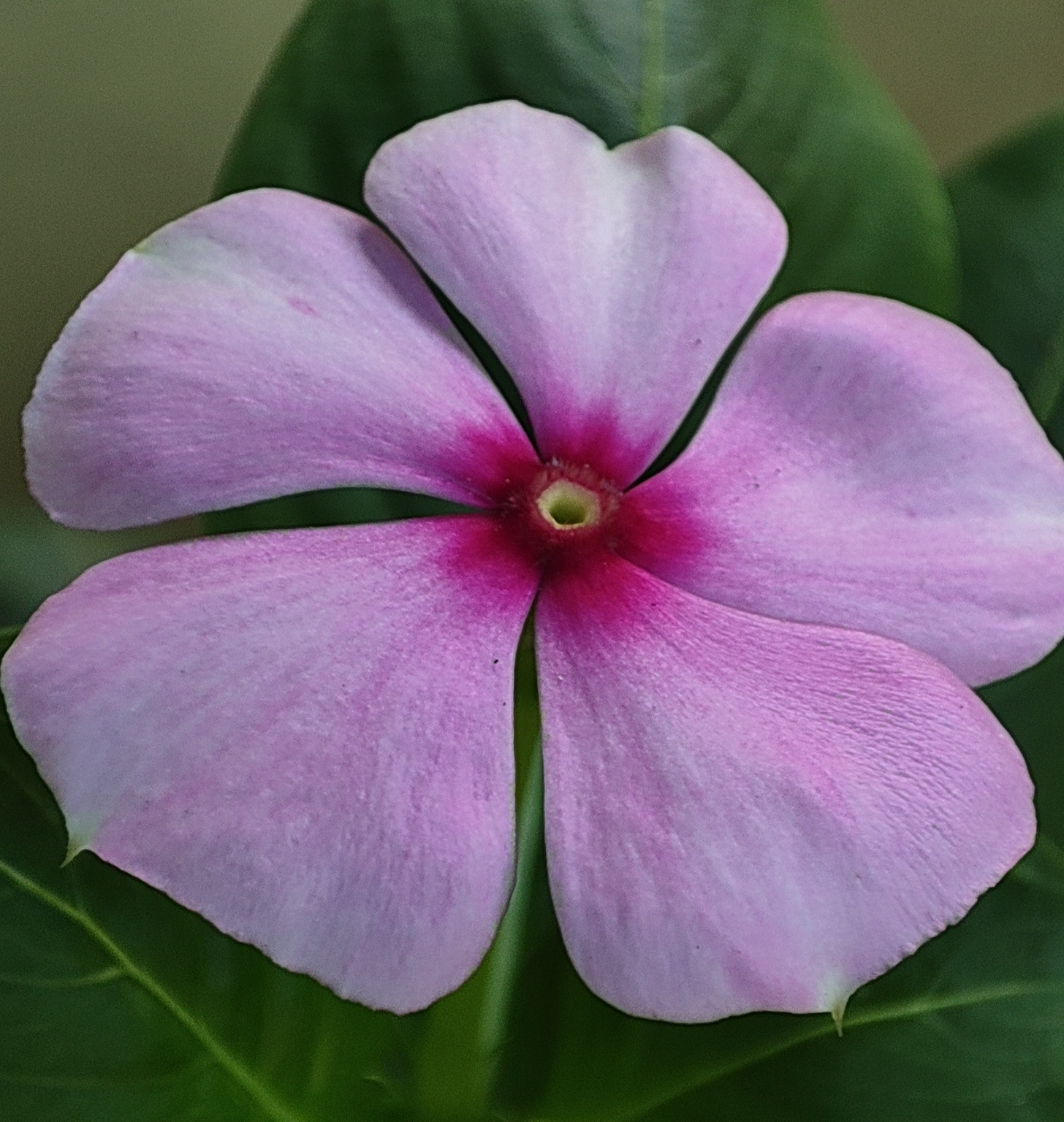
In morning

Catharanthus roseus is an evergreen subshrub or herbaceous plant growing 1 m (39 in) tall. The leaves are oval to oblong, 2.5–9 cm (1.0–3.5 in) long and 1–3.5 cm (0.4–1.4 in) wide, glossy green, hairless, with a pale midrib and a short petiole 1–1.8 cm (0.4–0.7 in) long; they are arranged in opposite pairs. The flowers range from white with a yellow or red center to dark pink with a darker red center, with a basal tube 2.5–3 cm (1.0–1.2 in) long and a corolla 2–5 cm (0.8–2.0 in) diameter with five petal-like lobes. The fruit is a pair of follicles 2–4 cm (0.8–1.6 in) long and 3 mm (0.1 in) wide.

== Ecology ==
In its natural range along the dry coasts of southern Madagascar, Catharanthus roseus is considered weedy and invasive, often self-seeding prolifically in disturbed areas along roadsides and in fallow fields. It is also widely cultivated and is naturalized in subtropical and tropical areas of the world such as Australia, Bangladesh, India, Malaysia, Pakistan, and the United States. It is so well adapted to growth in Australia that it is listed as a noxious weed in Western Australia and the Australian Capital Territory, and also in parts of eastern Queensland.

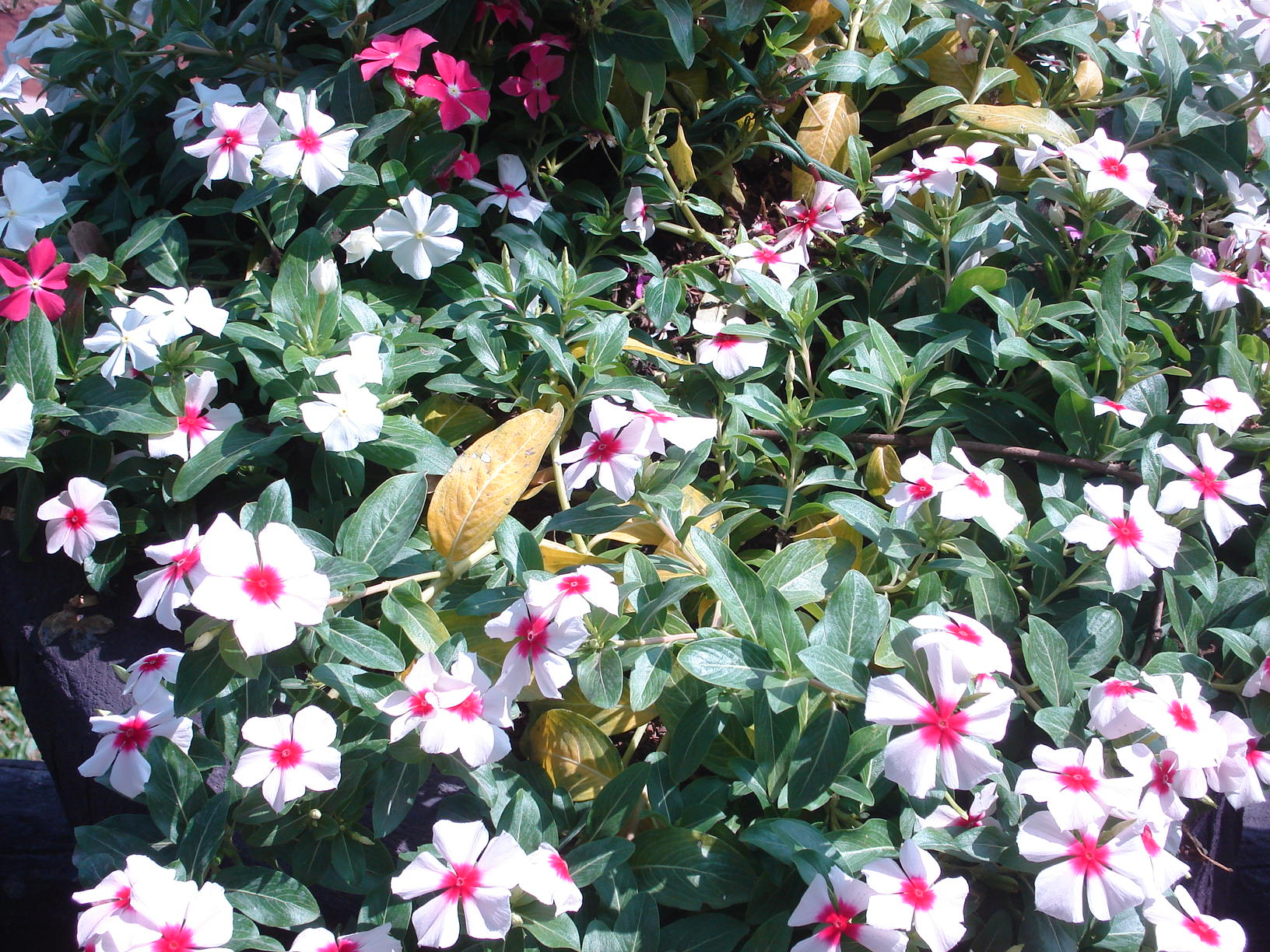
Pale Pink with Red Centre Cultivar

== Cultivation ==
As an ornamental plant, it is appreciated for its hardiness in dry and nutritionally deficient conditions, popular in subtropical gardens where temperatures never fall below 5–7 °C (41–45 °F), and as a warm season bedding plant in temperate gardens. It is noted for its long flowering period, throughout the year in tropical conditions, and from spring to late autumn, in warm temperate climates. Full sun and well-drained soil are preferred. Numerous cultivars have been selected, for variation in flower color (white, mauve, peach, scarlet, and reddish orange), and also for tolerance of cooler growing conditions in temperate regions.

Notable cultivars include 'Albus' (white flowers), 'Grape Cooler' (rose-pink; cool-tolerant), the Ocellatus Group (various colors), and 'Peppermint Cooler' (white with a red center; cool-tolerant).

In the U.S. it often remains identified as "Vinca" although botanists have shifted its identification and it often can be seen growing along roadsides in the south.

In the United Kingdom it has gained the Royal Horticultural Society's Award of Garden Merit (confirmed 2017).

== Uses ==
=== Traditional ===
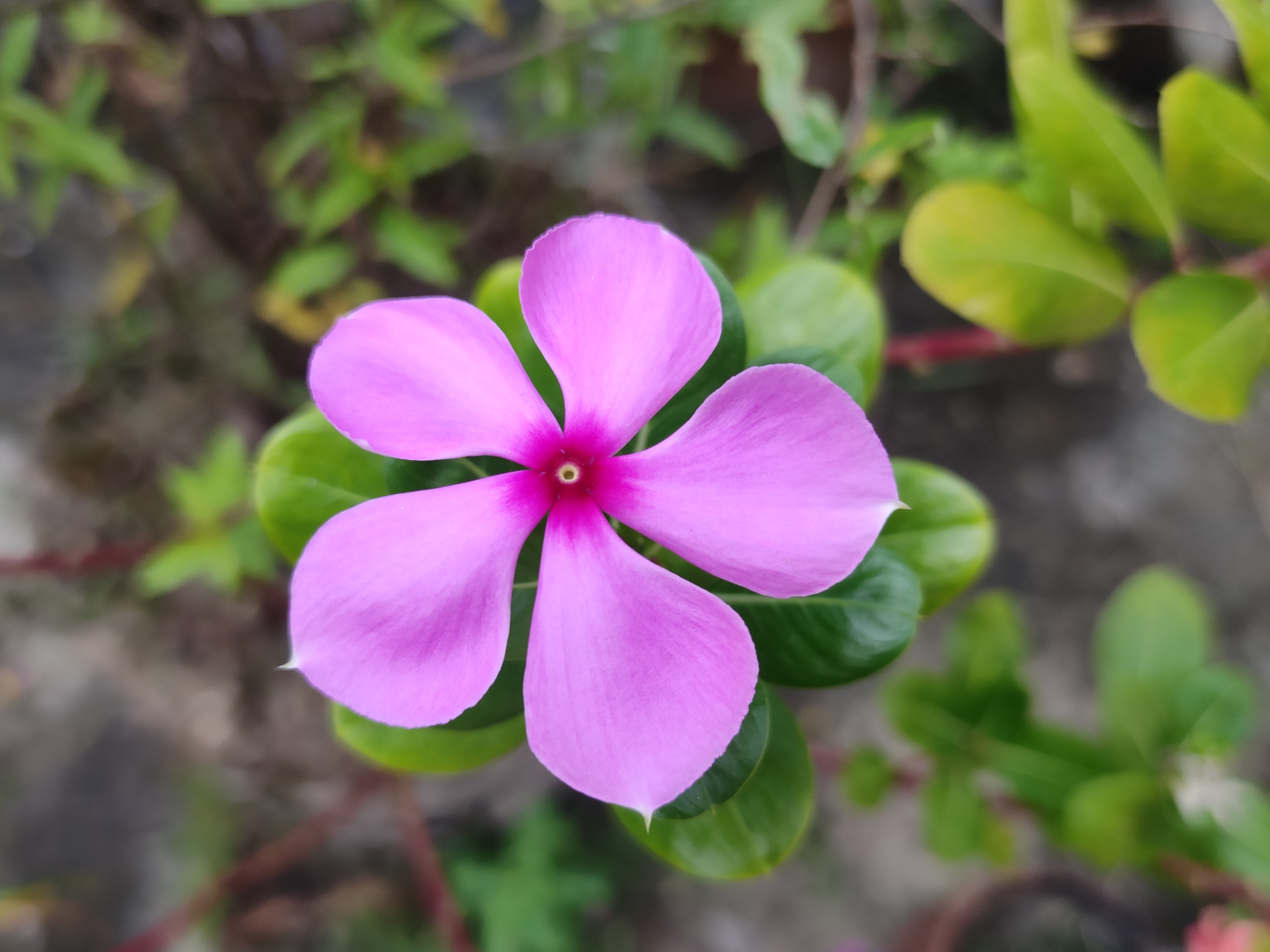
Catharanthus roseus in Rajshahi, Bangladesh

In Ayurveda (Indian traditional medicine) the extracts of its roots and shoots, although poisonous, are used against several diseases. In traditional Chinese medicine, extracts from it have been used against numerous diseases, including diabetes, malaria, and Hodgkin's lymphoma. In the 1950s, vinca alkaloids, including vinblastine and vincristine, were isolated from Catharanthus roseus while screening for anti-diabetic drugs. This chance discovery led to increased research into the chemotherapeutic effects of vinblastine and vincristine. Conflict between historical indigenous use, and a patent from 2001 on C. roseus-derived drugs by western pharmaceutical companies, without compensation, has led to accusations of biopiracy.

=== Medicinal ===
Vinblastine and vincristine, chemotherapy medications used to treat several types of cancers, are found in the plant and are biosynthesized from the coupling of the alkaloids catharanthine and vindoline. The newer semi-synthetic chemotherapeutic agent vinorelbine, used in the treatment of non-small-cell lung cancer, can be prepared either from vindoline and catharanthine or from the vinca alkaloid leurosine, in both cases via anhydrovinblastine. The insulin-stimulating vincoline has been isolated from the plant.

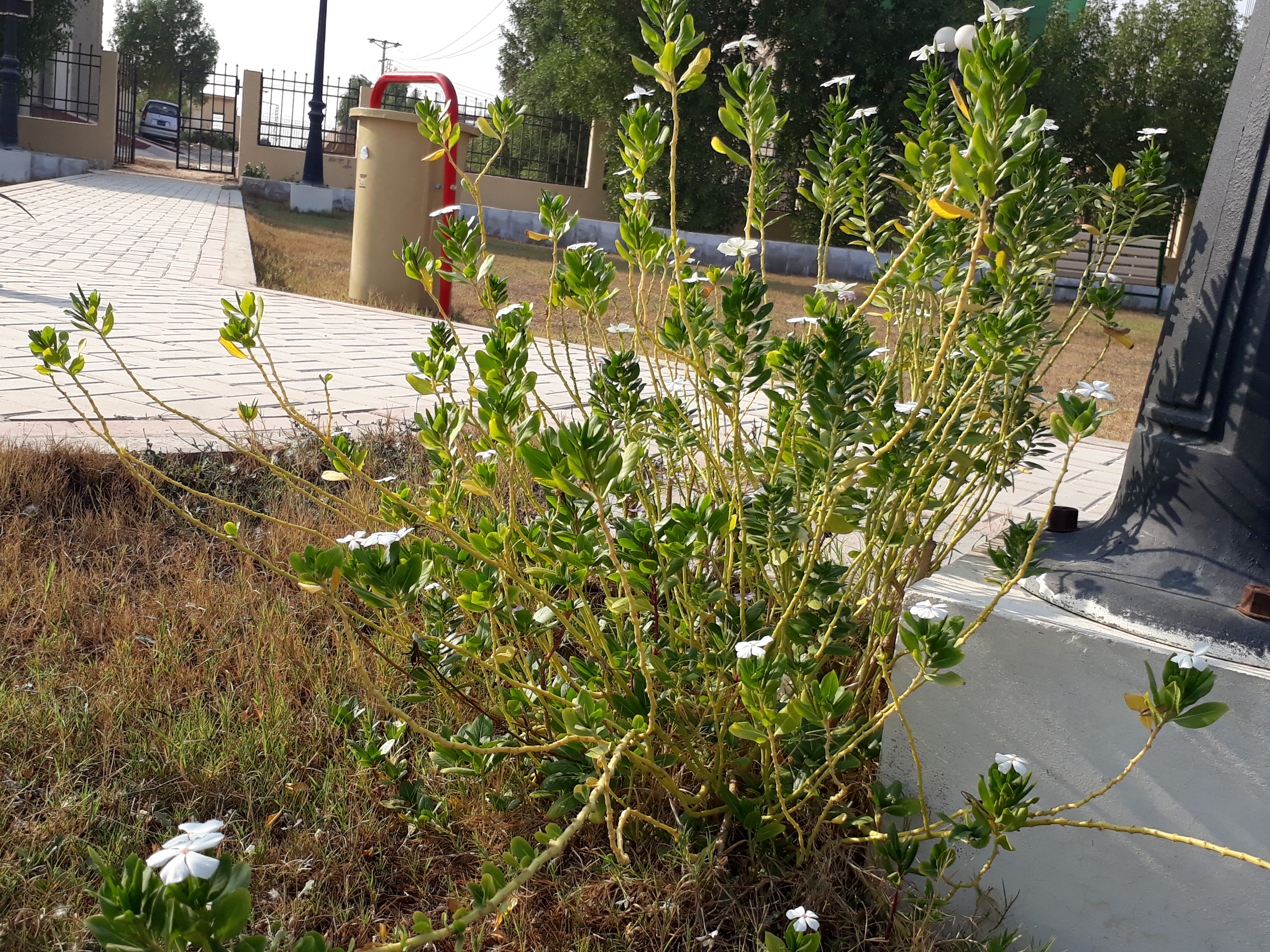
A periwinkle shrub

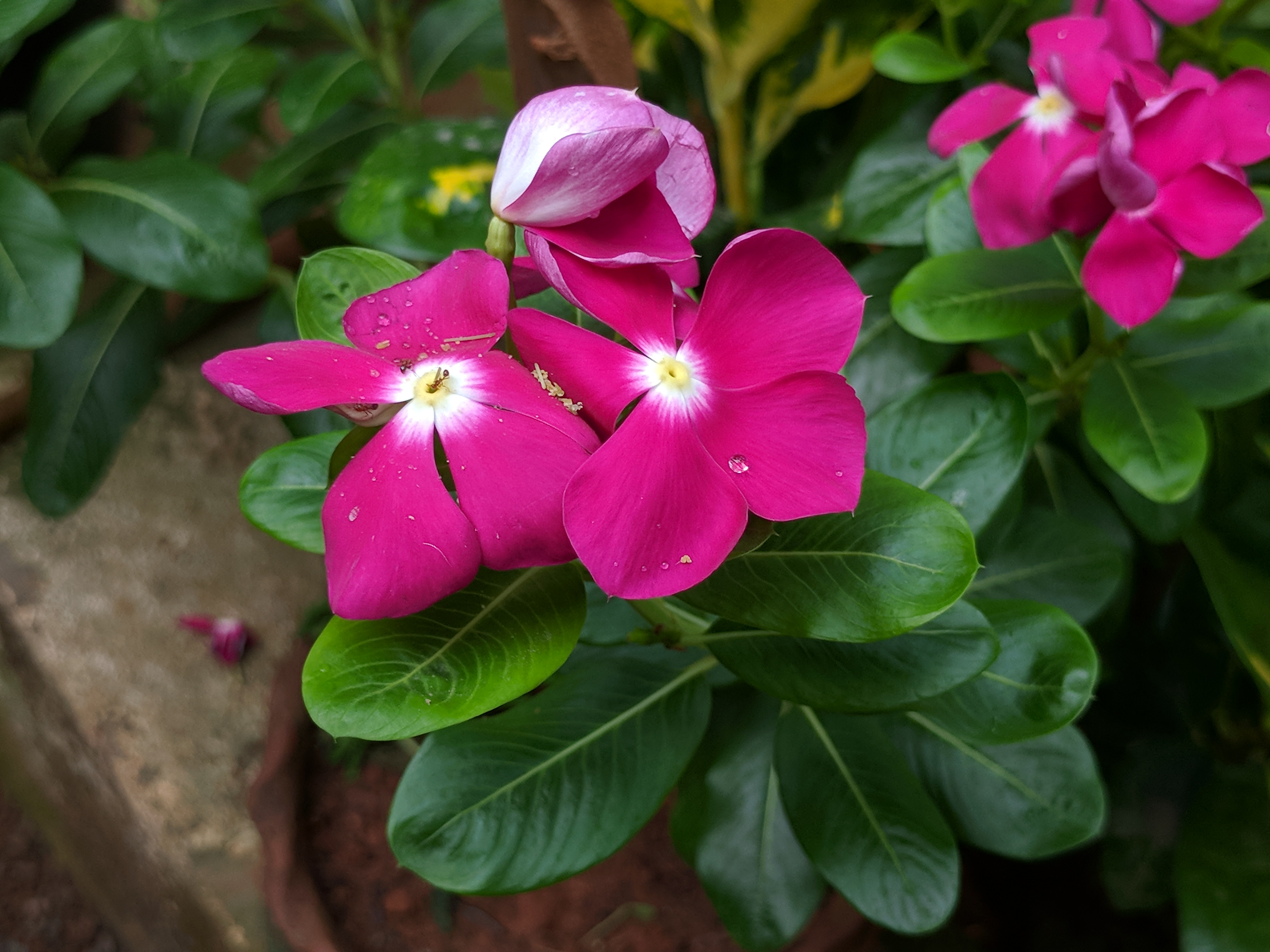

=== Research ===
Despite the medical importance and wide use, the desired alkaloids (vinblastine and vincristine) are naturally produced at very low yields. Additionally, it is complex and costly to synthesize the desired products in a lab, resulting in difficulty satisfying the demand and a need for overproduction. Treatment of the plant with phytohormones, such as salicylic acid and methyl jasmonate, have been shown to trigger defense mechanisms and overproduce downstream alkaloids. Studies using this technique vary in growth conditions, choice of phytohormone, and location of treatment. Concurrently, there are various efforts to map the biosynthetic pathway producing the alkaloids to find a direct path to overproduction via genetic engineering.

C. roseus is used in plant pathology as an experimental host for phytoplasmas. This is because it is easy to infect with a large majority of phytoplasmas, and also often has very distinctive symptoms such as phyllody and significantly reduced leaf size.

In 1995 and 2006 Malagasy agronomists and American political ecologists studied the production of Catharanthus roseus around Fort Dauphin and Ambovombe and its export as a natural source of the alkaloids used to make vincristine, vinblastine and other vinca alkaloid cancer drugs. Their research focused on the wild collection of periwinkle roots and leaves from roadsides and fields and its industrial cultivation on large farms.

== Biology ==
Rosinidin is the pink anthocyanidin pigment found in the flowers of C. roseus. Lochnericine is a major alkaloid in roots.

== Toxicity ==
C. roseus can be extremely toxic if consumed orally by humans, and is cited (under its synonym Vinca rosea) in the Louisiana State Act 159. All parts of the plant are poisonous. On consumption, symptoms consist of mild stomach cramps, cardiac complications, hypotension, systematic paralysis eventually leading to death.

According to French botanist Pierre Boiteau, its poisonous properties are made known along generations of Malagasy people as a poison consumed in ordeal trials, even before the tangena fruit was used. This lent the flower one of its names vonenina, from Malagasy: vony nenina meaning "flower of remorse".

== Gallery ==
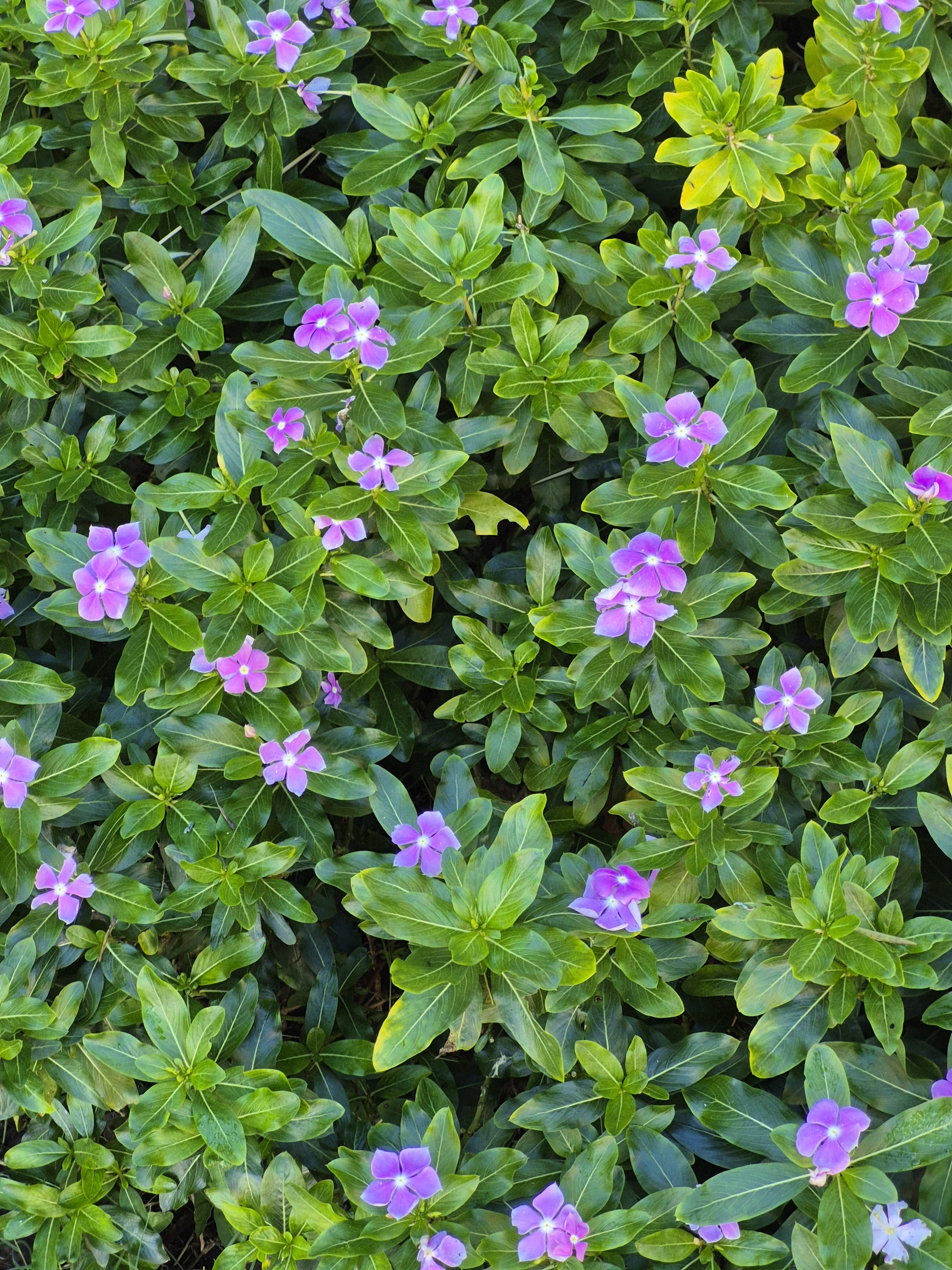
Shrub in Brazil

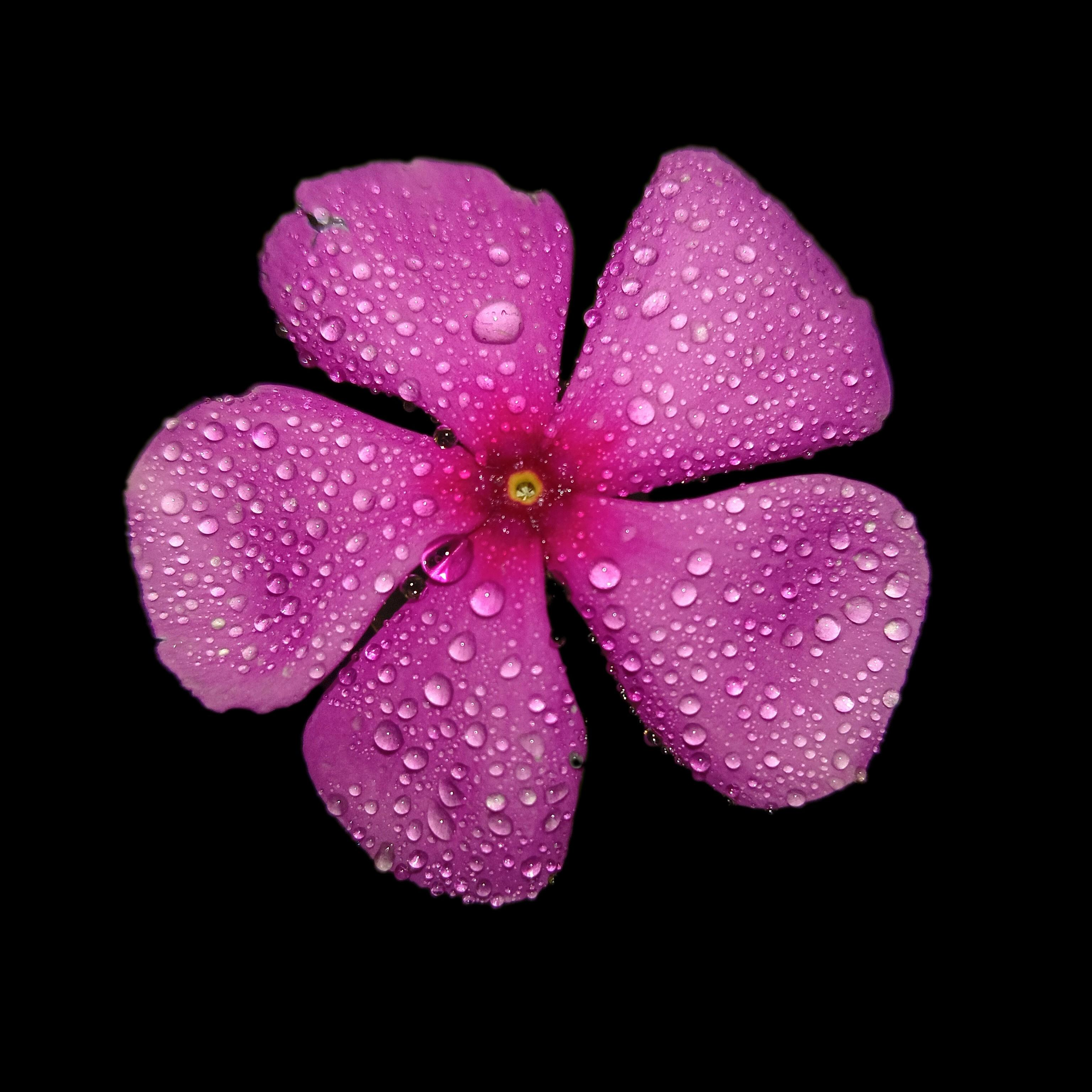
Catharanthus roseus with water droplets

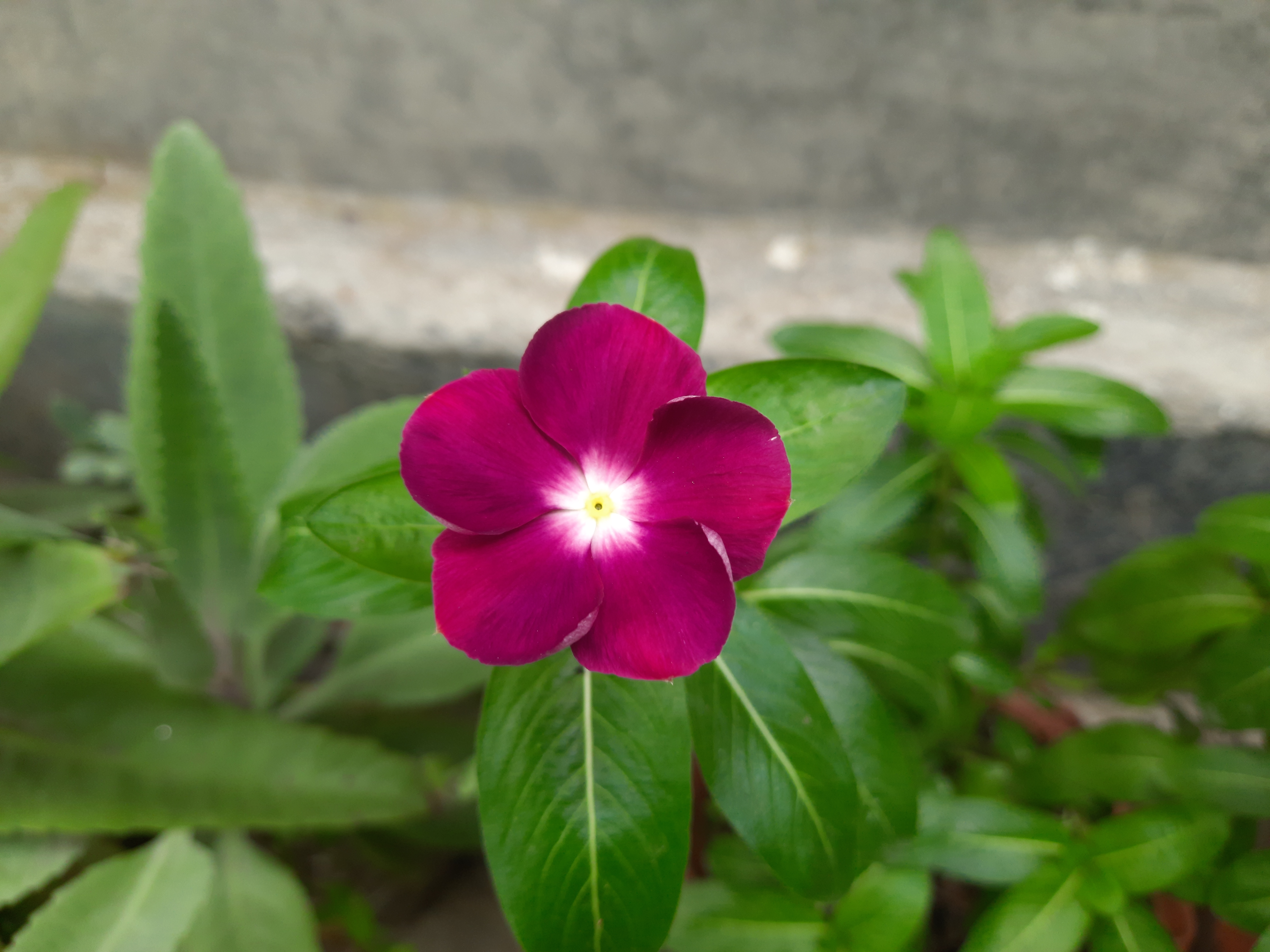
Deep-red Catharanthus roseus

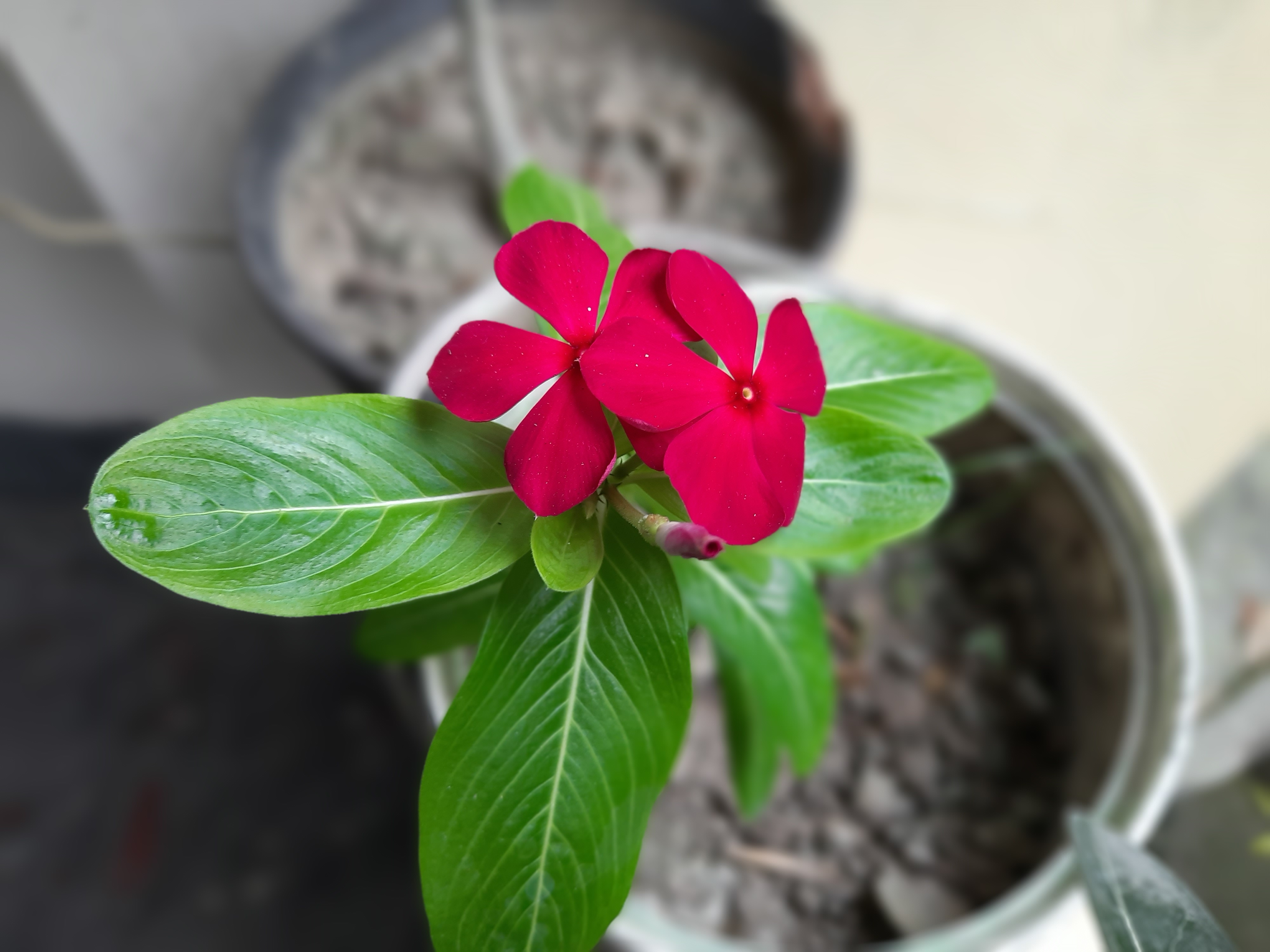
This one was grown in Bangladesh as an ornamental plant in a flower tub in the balcony of a house

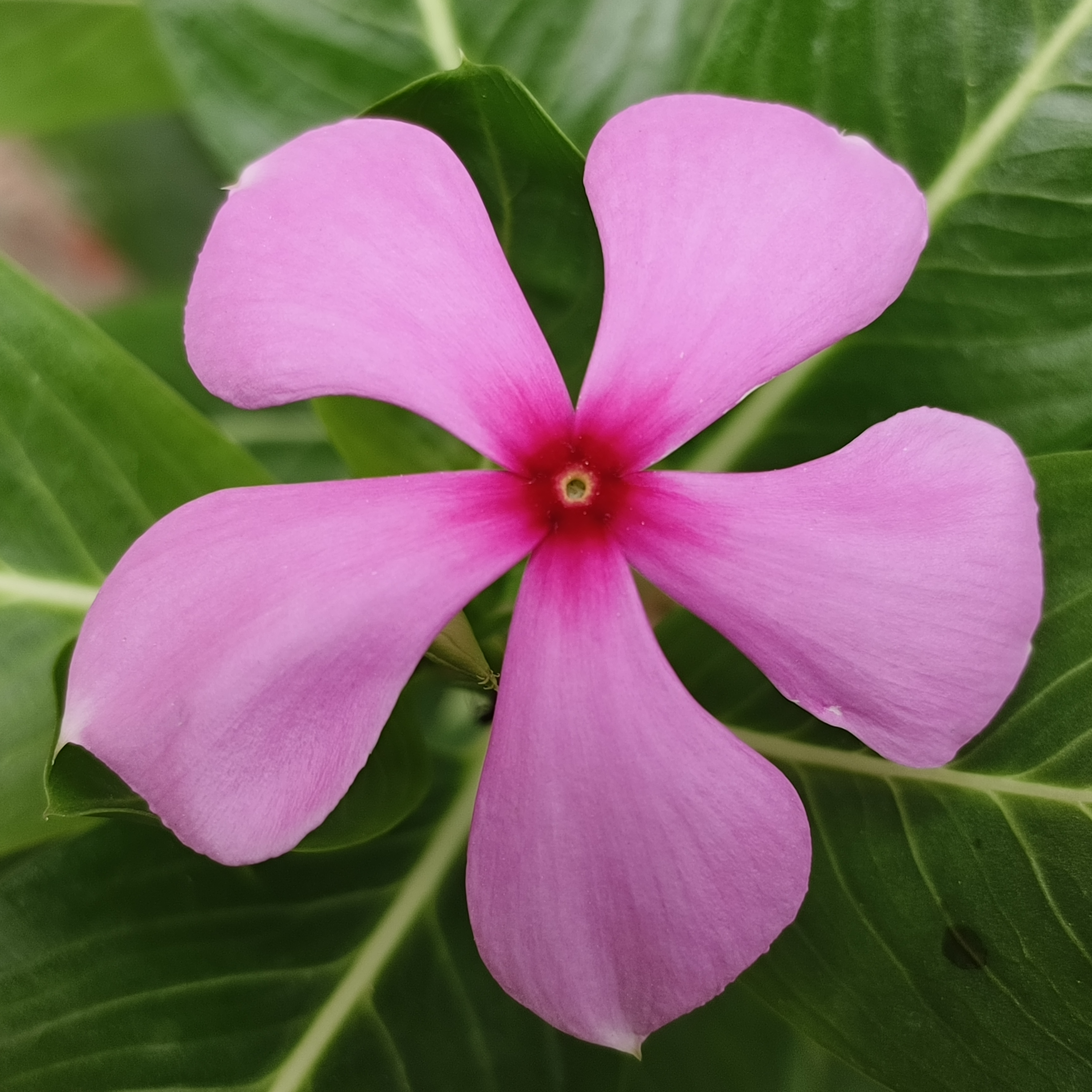
Close-up of a pink Catharanthus roseus flower

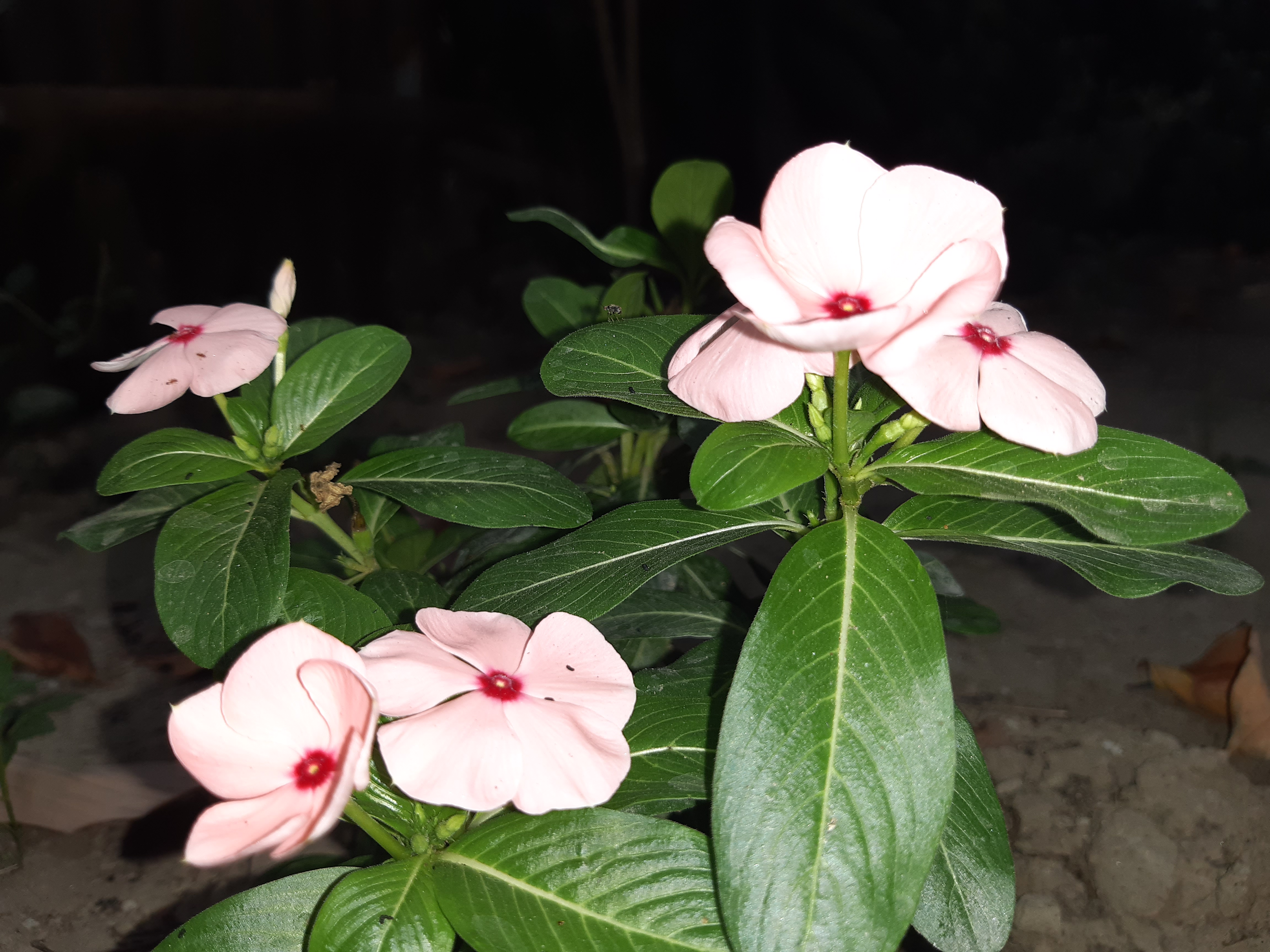
Off-white Catharanthus roseus

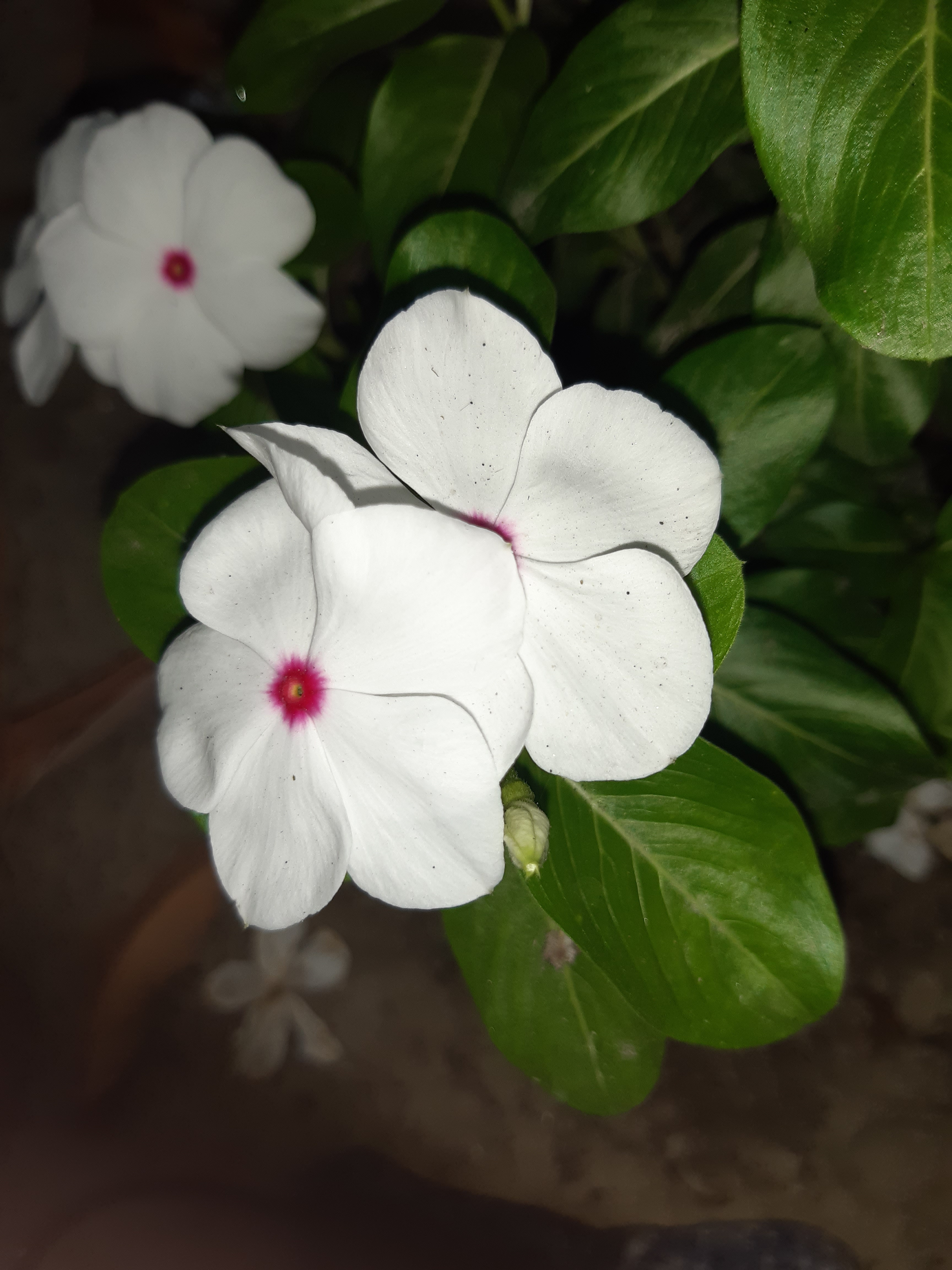
White with red-centered Catharanthus roseus

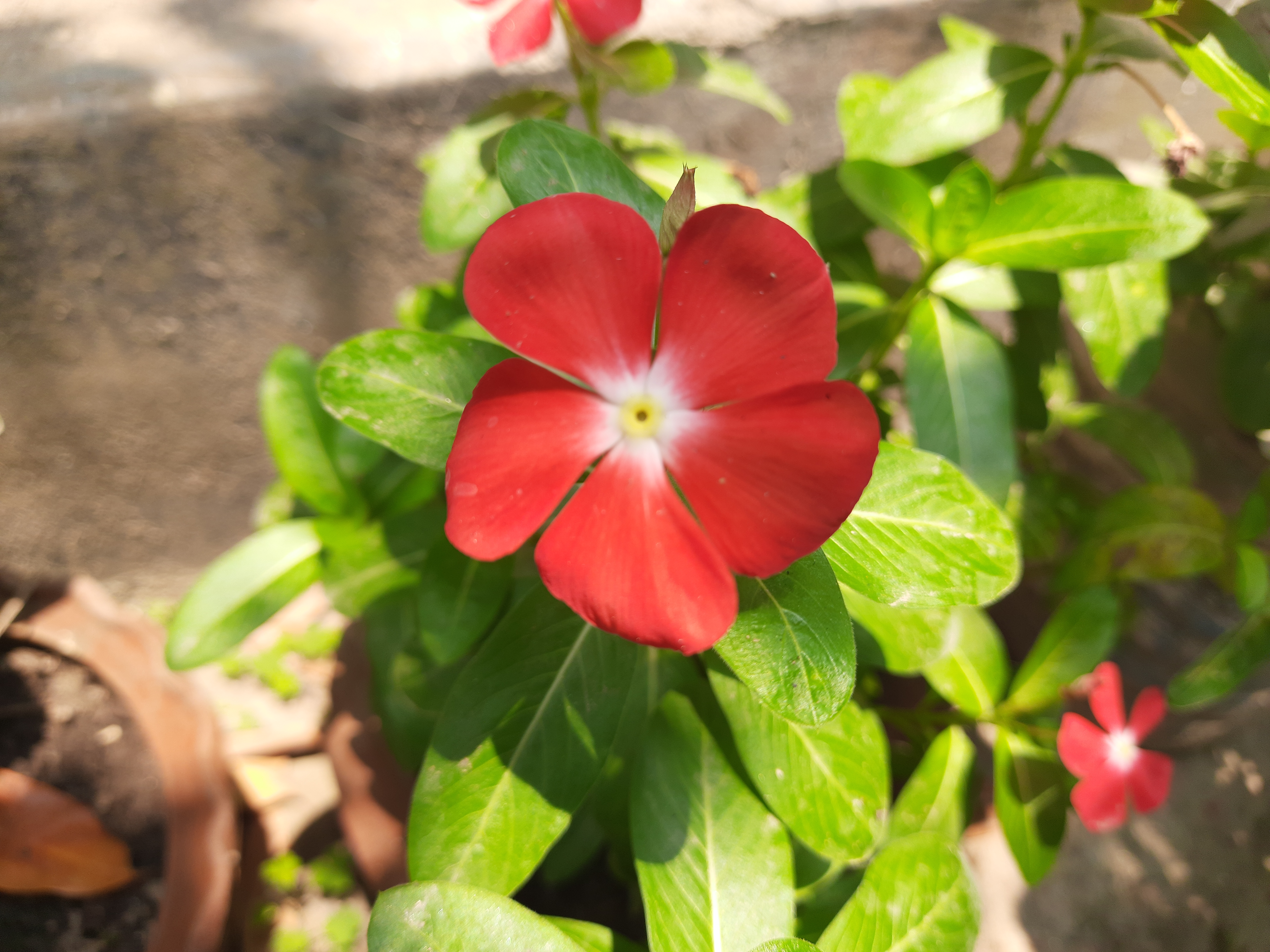
Red Catharanthus roseus

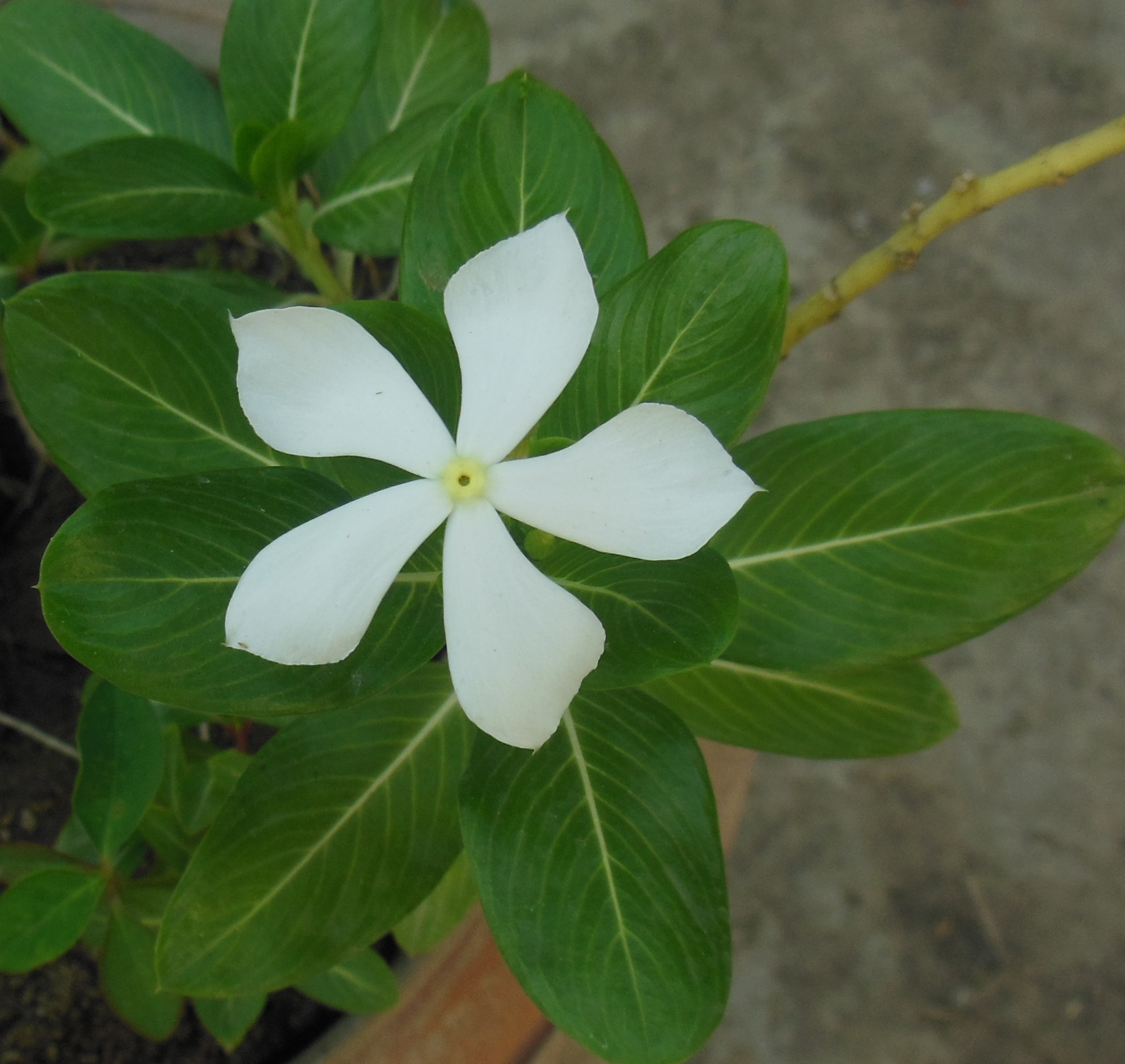
White periwinkle with thin petals

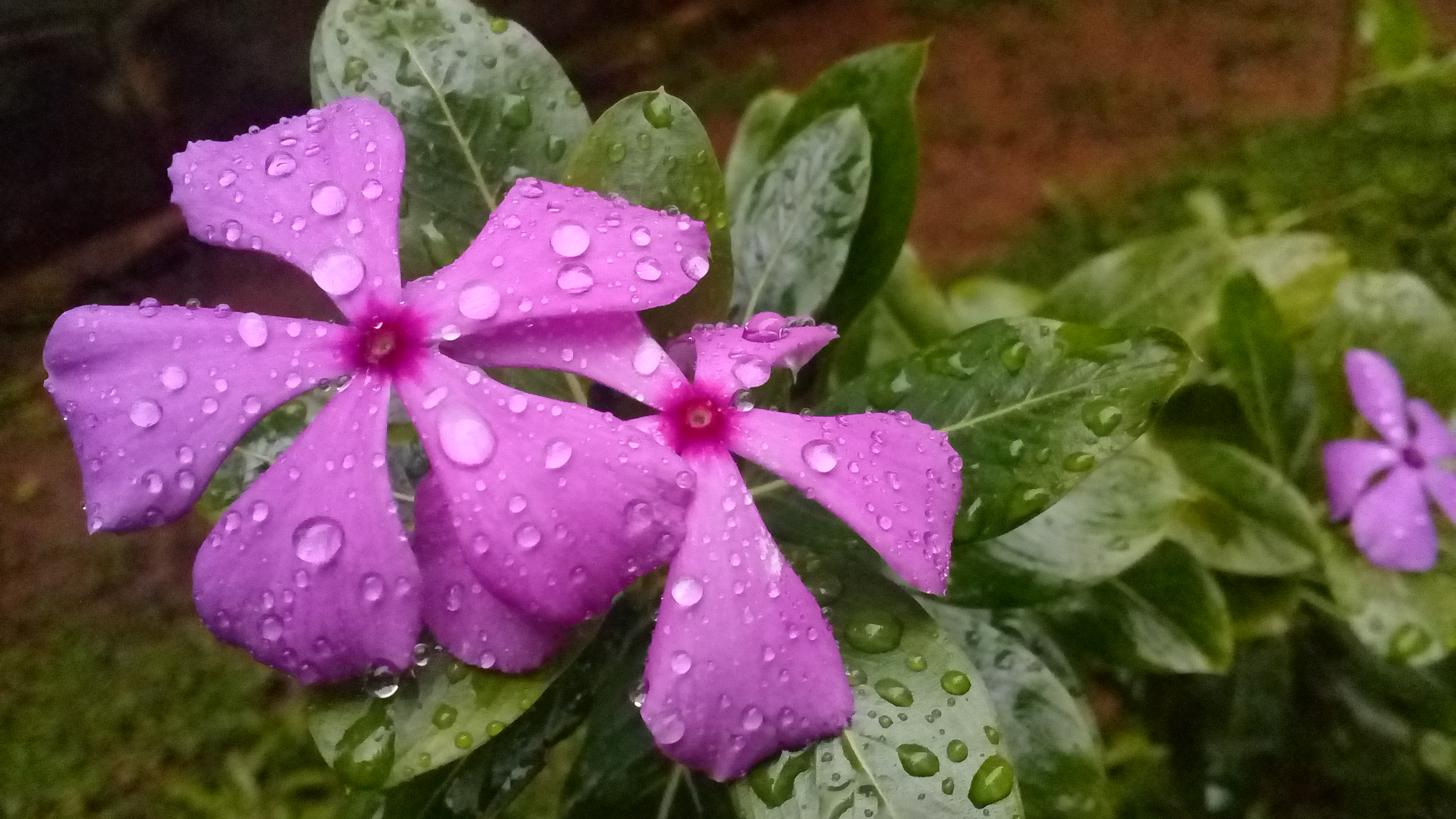
Catharanthus roseus in Kerala

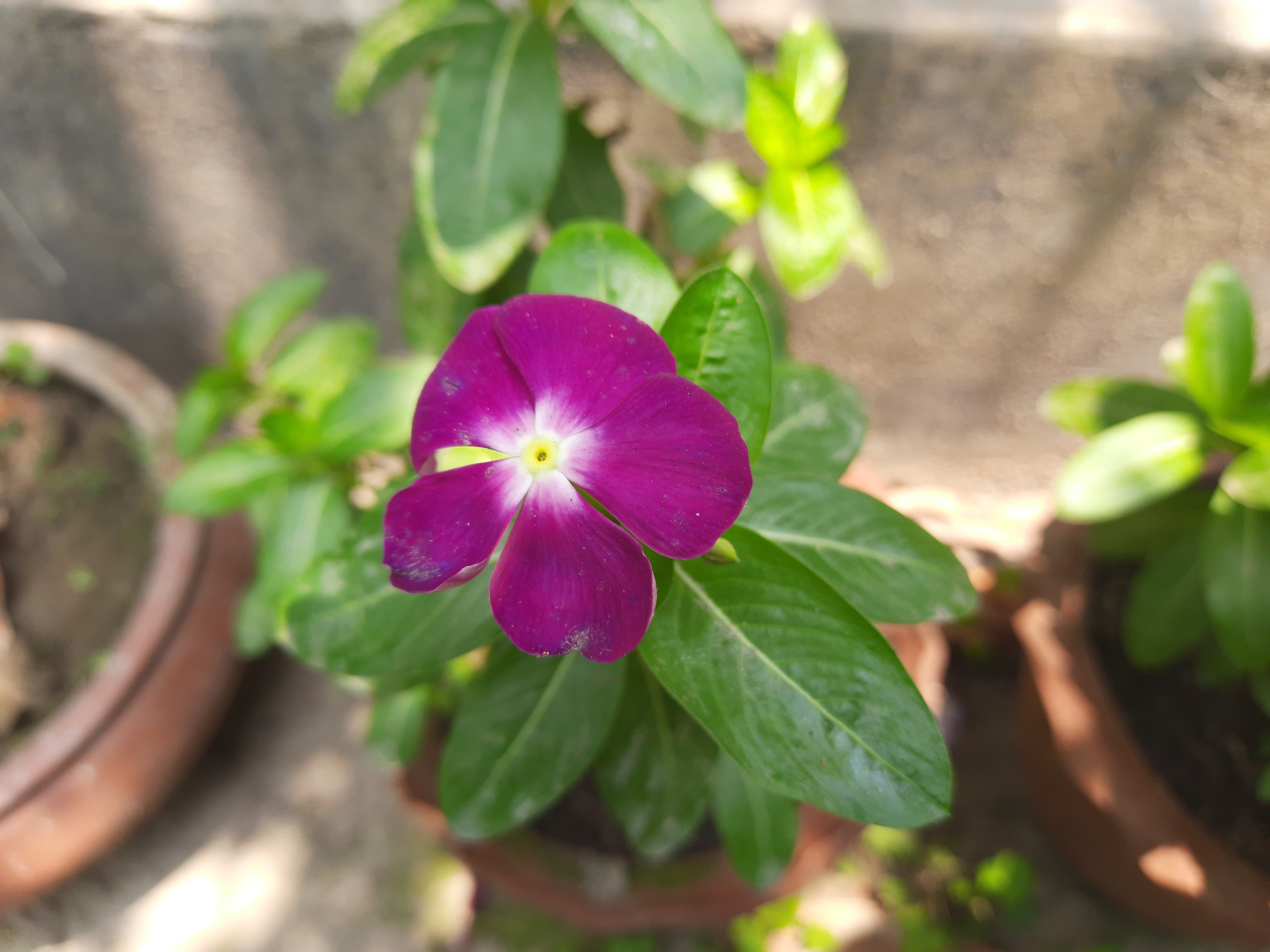
Purple Catharanthus roseus

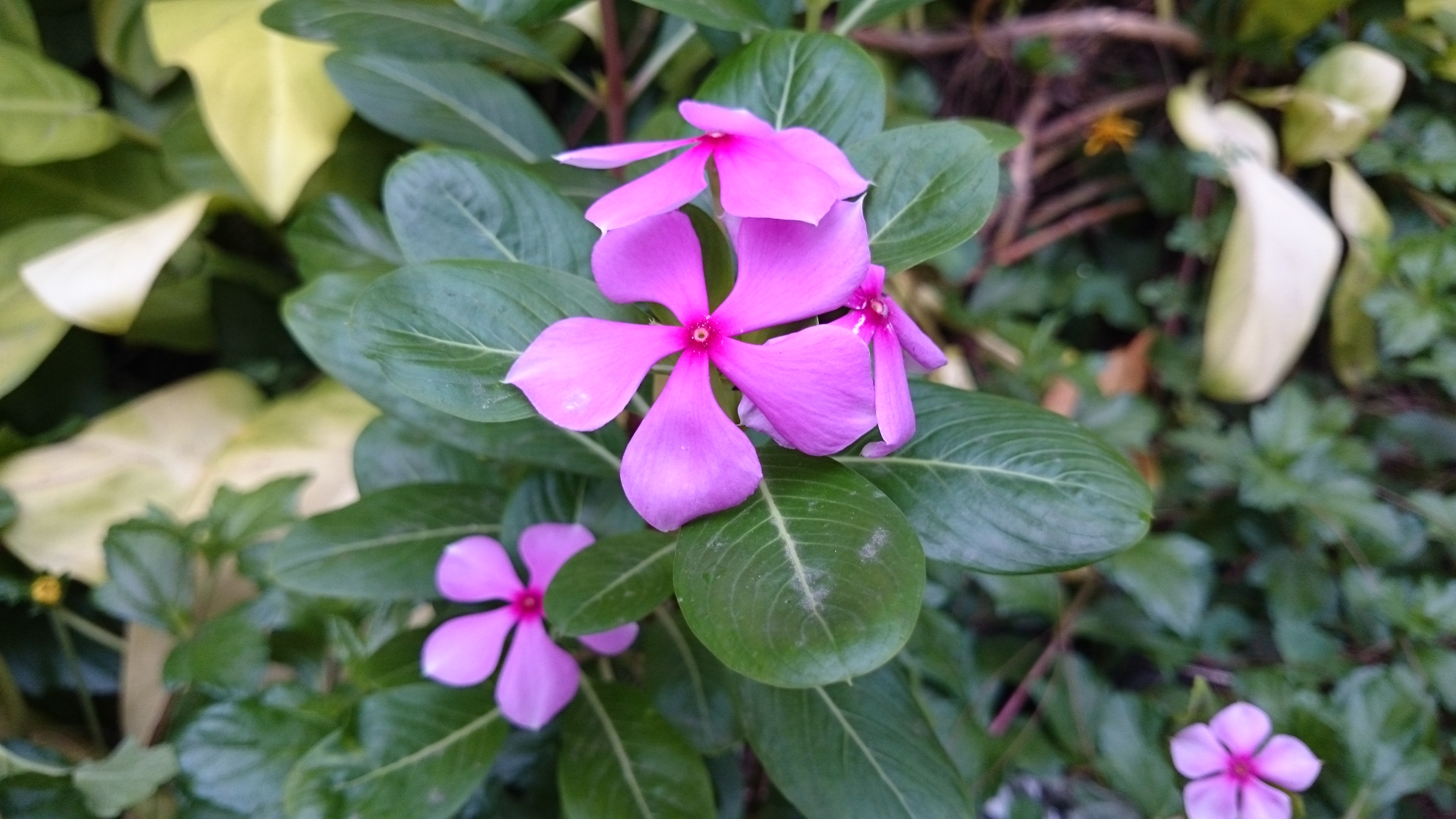
Periwinkle From a garden at Cox's Bazar, Bangladesh

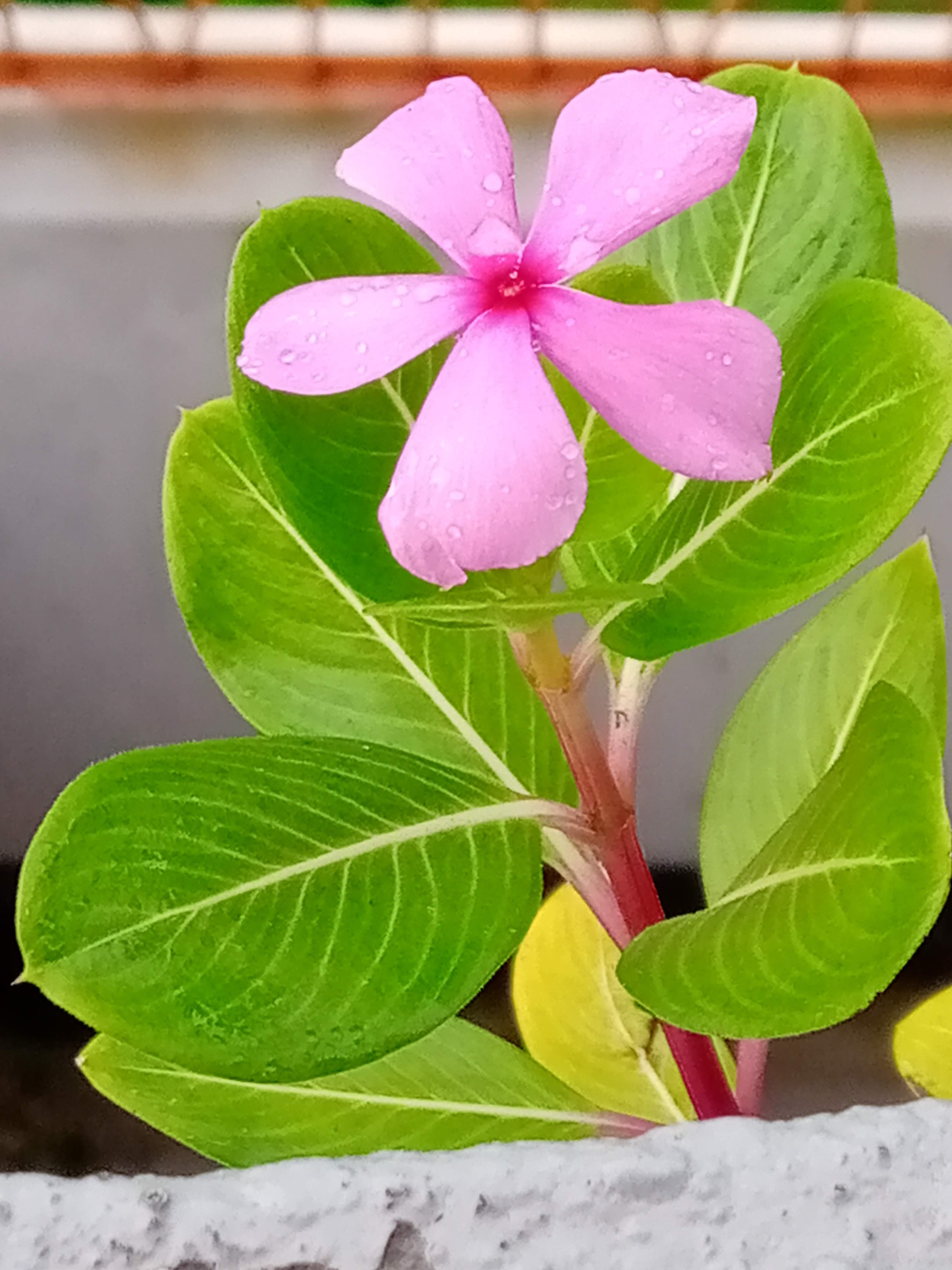
Catharanthus roseus in Ishwardi, Bangladesh

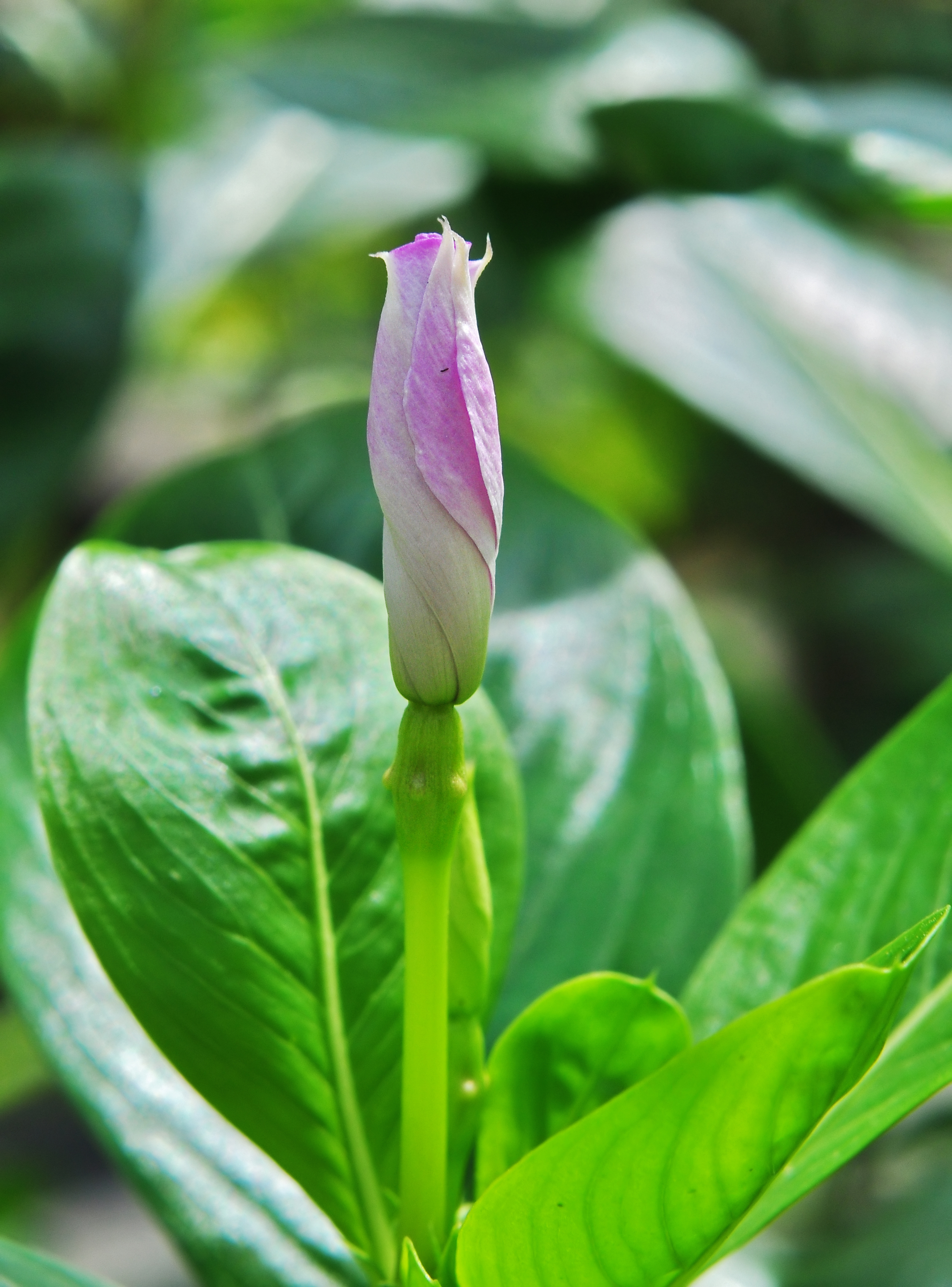
Flower bud in West Bengal, India

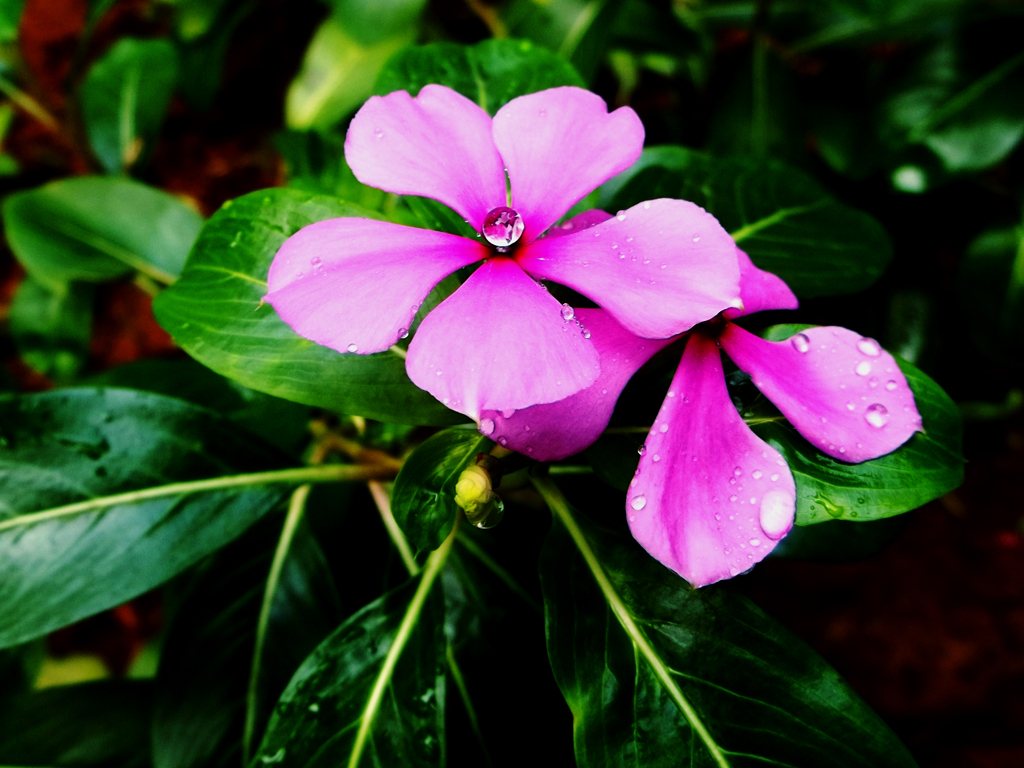
Periwinkle Plant in India

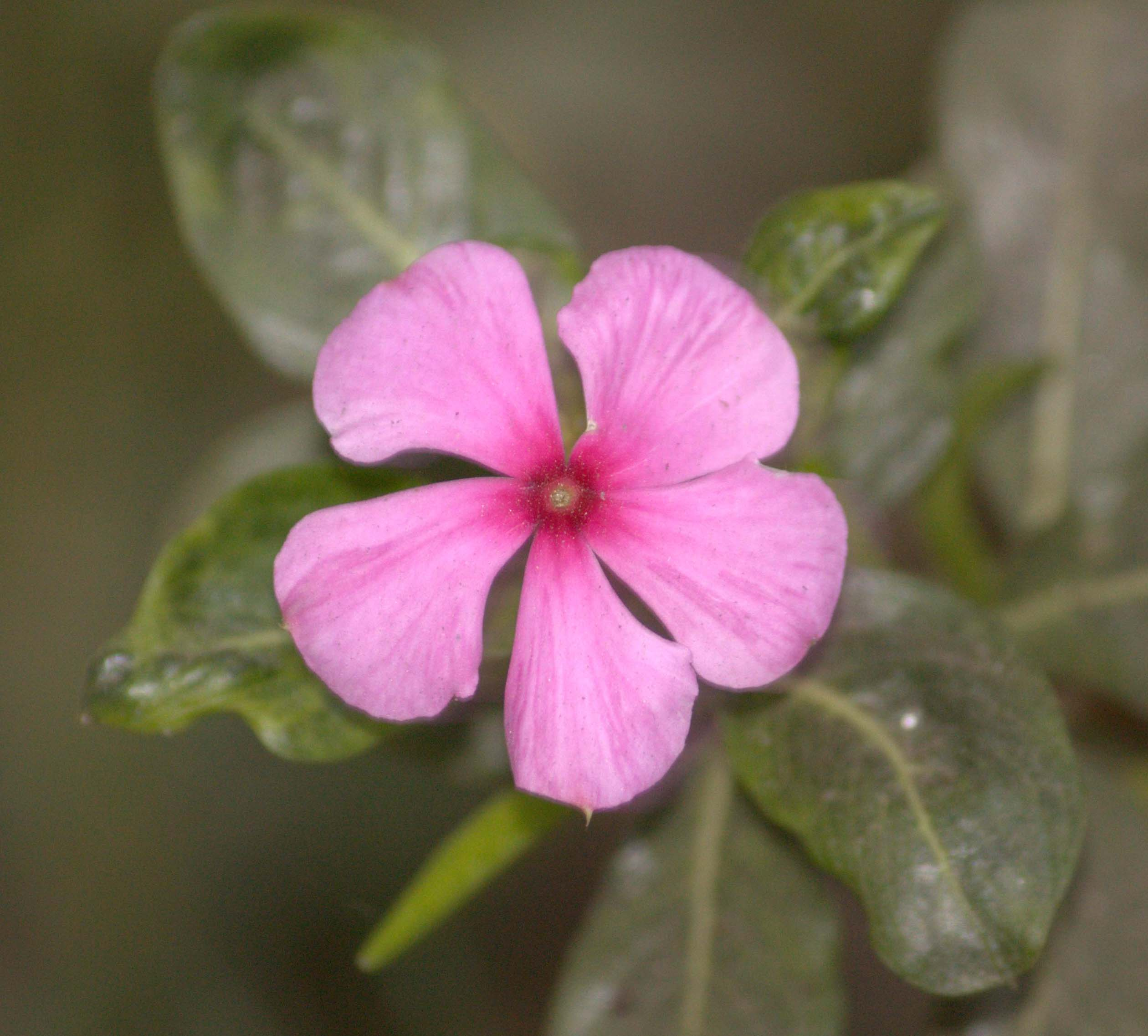
Common periwinkle plant in India

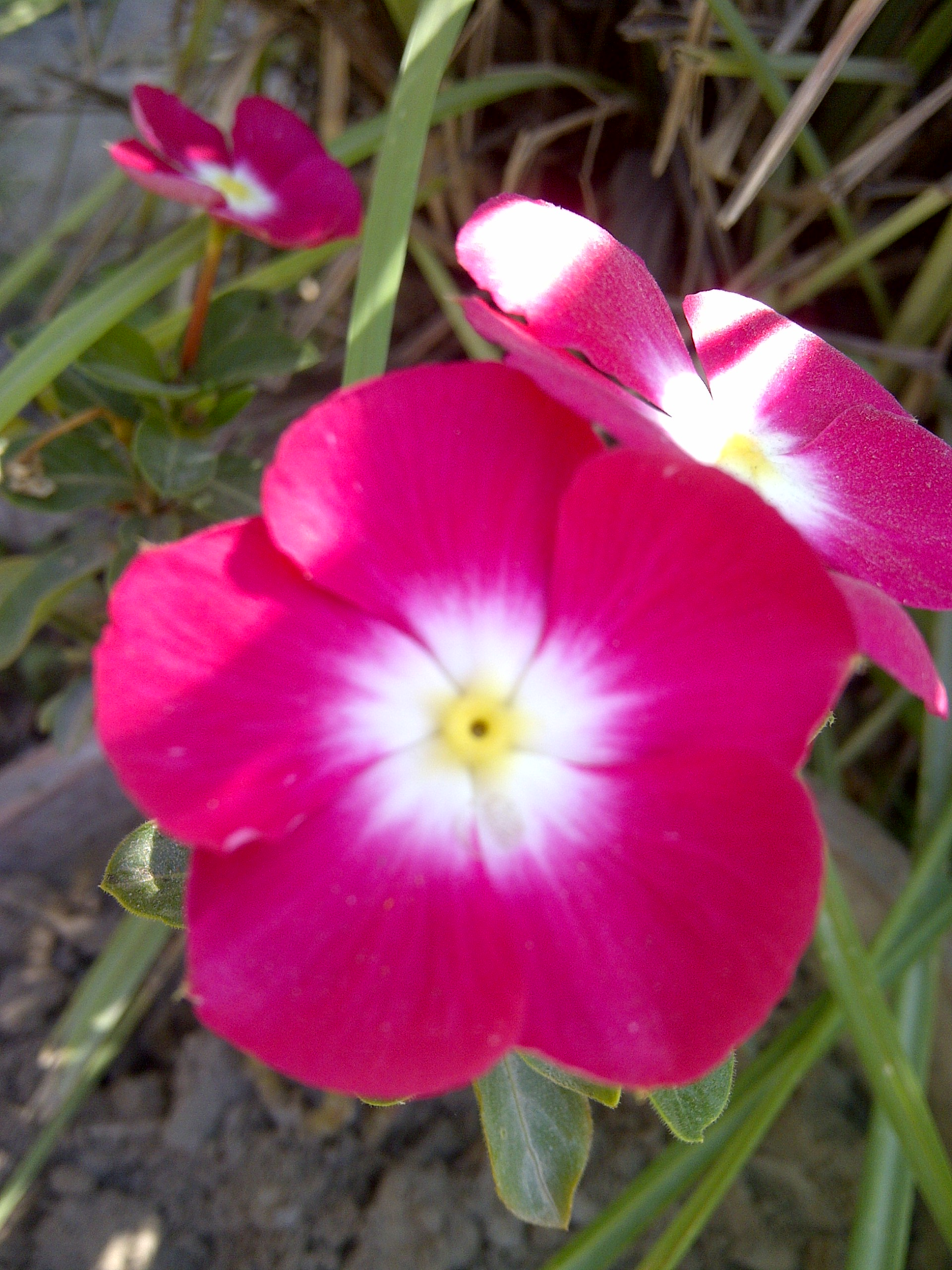
Catharanthus roseus in Pakistan

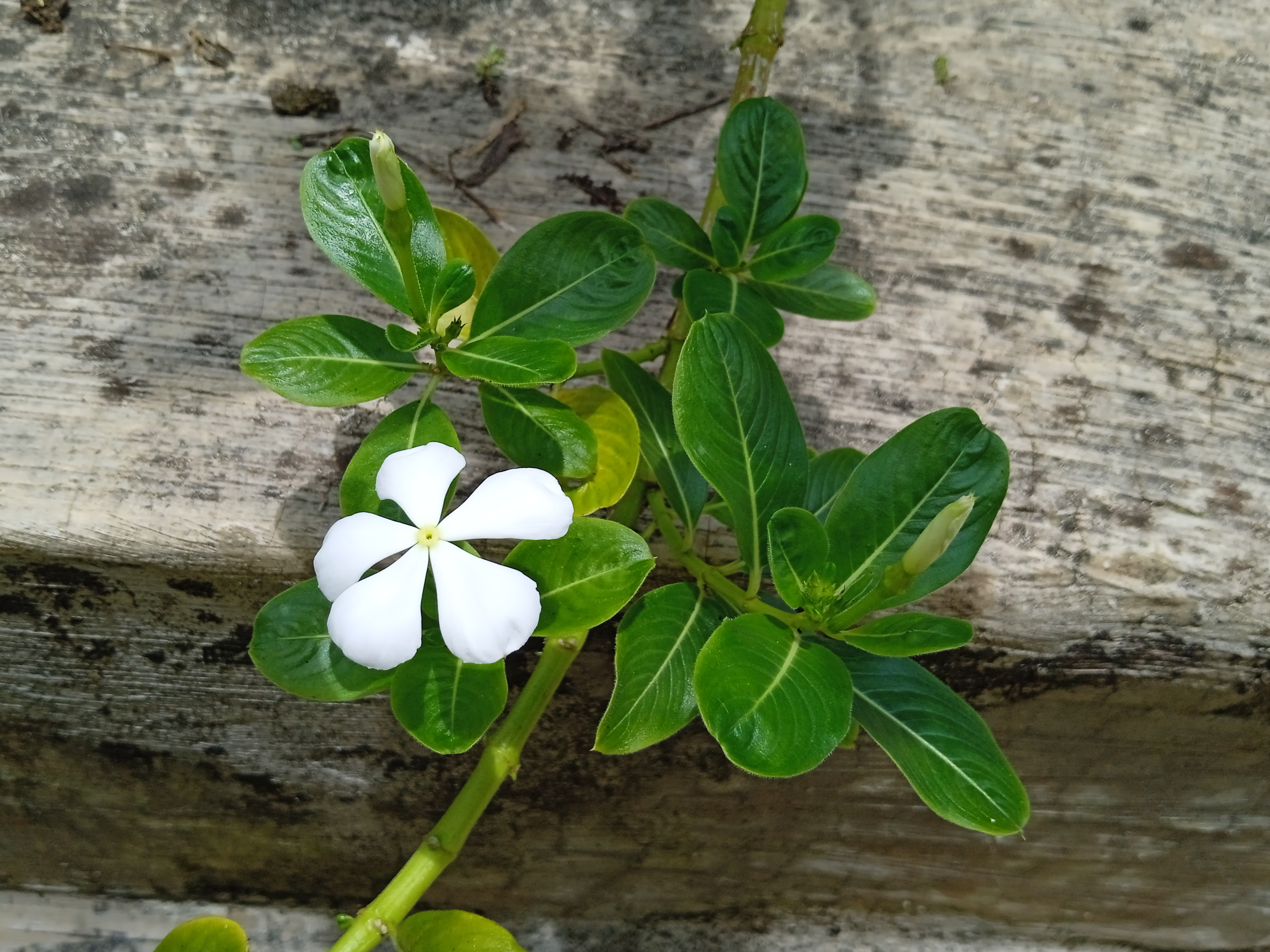
Grown in Malaysia

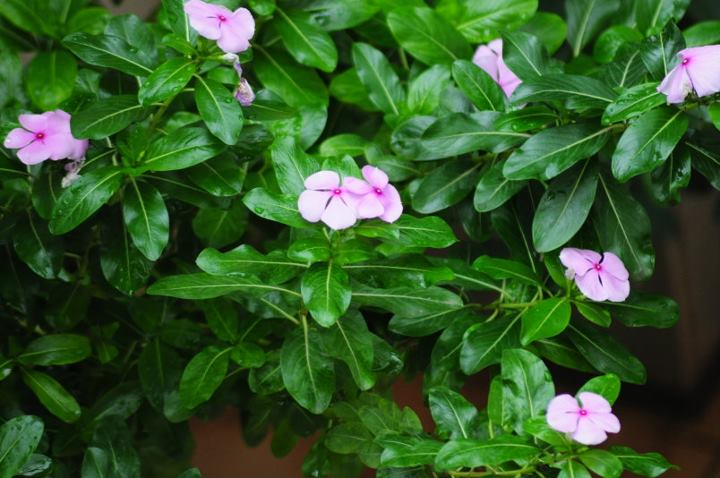
Flower plant raised in India temples

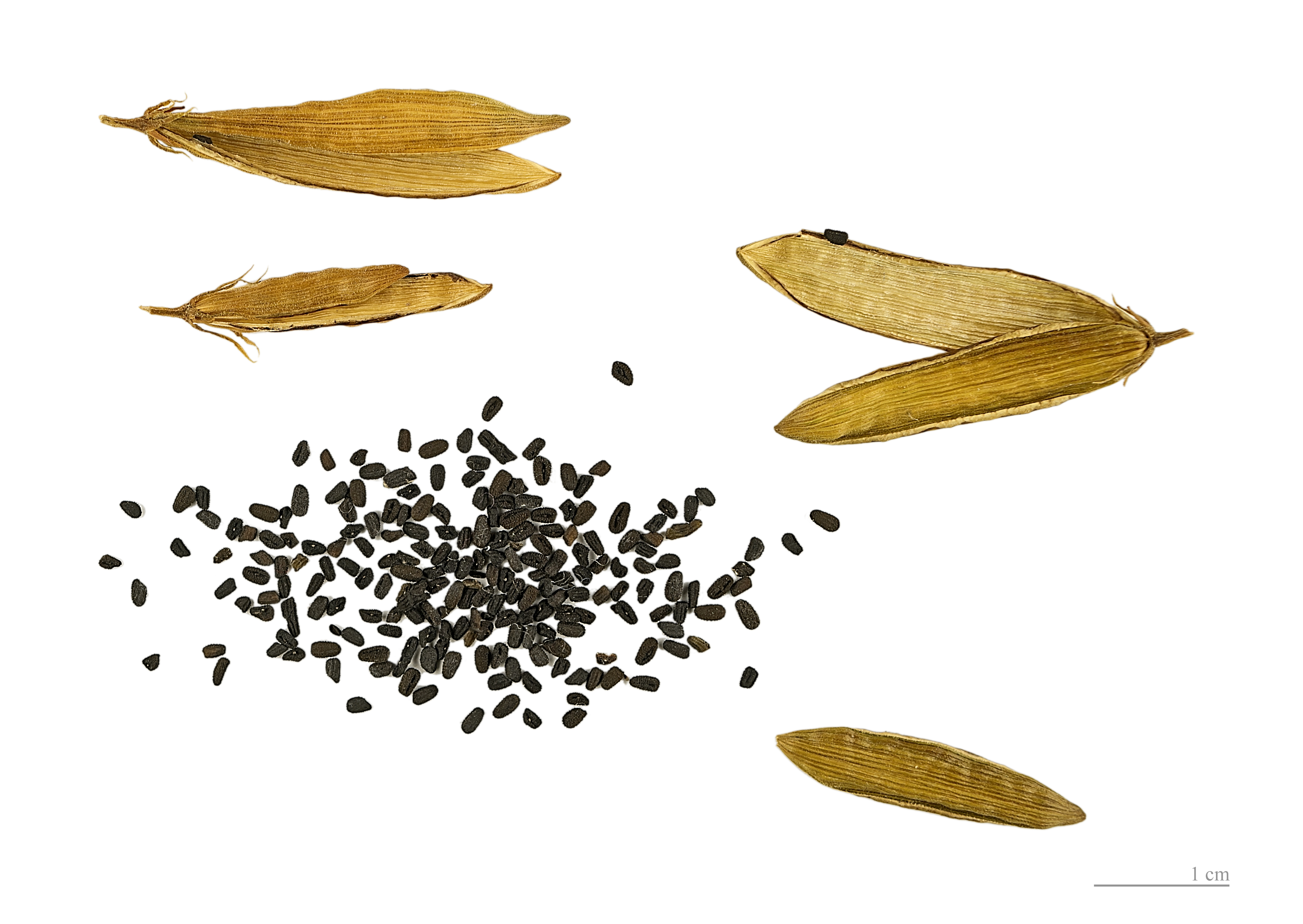
Seed pod and seeds

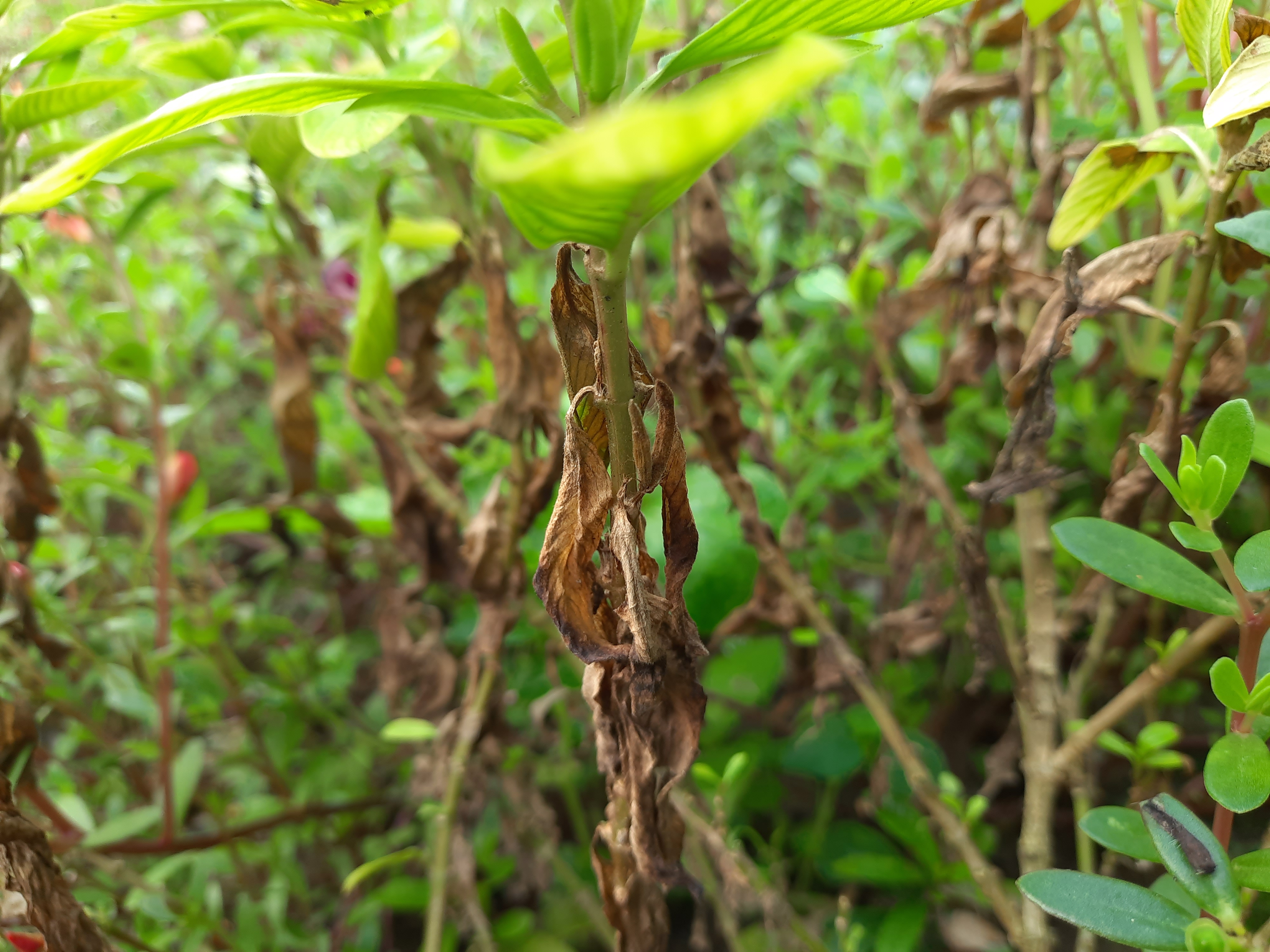
Matured fruits of Madagascar Periwinkle

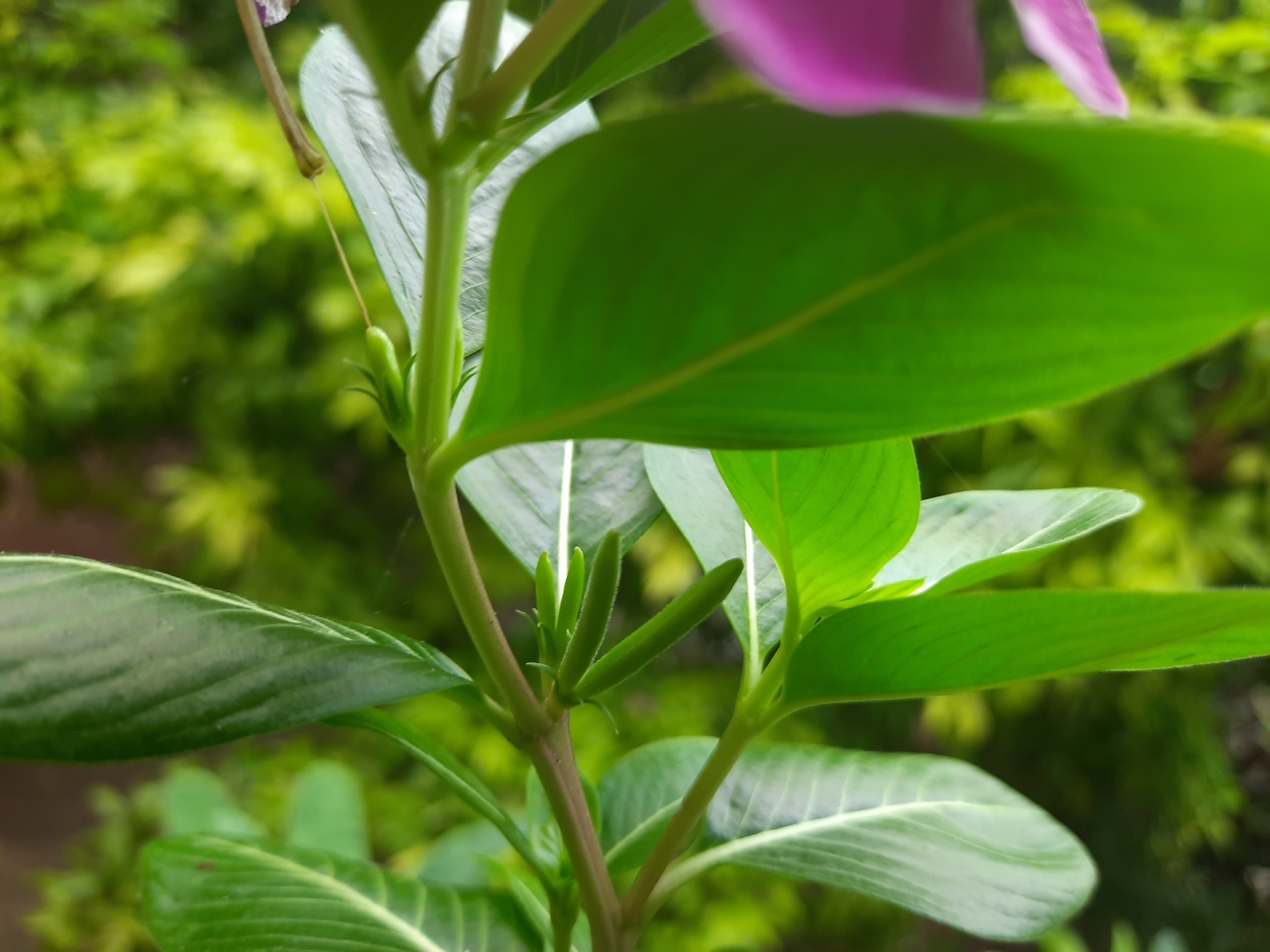
Immature fruits of Madagascar periwinkle

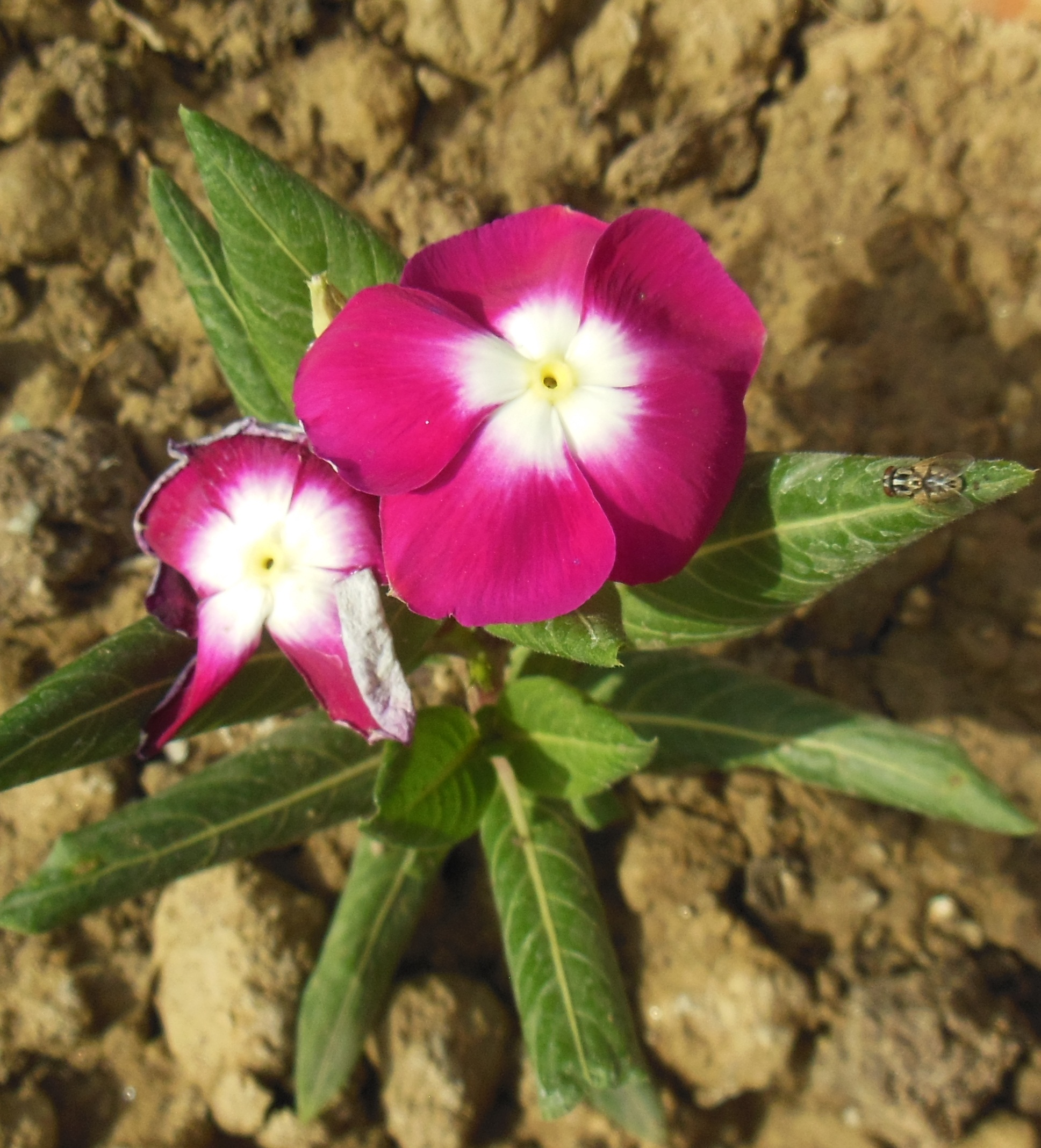
Pacifica Burgundy Halo – Madagascar Periwinkle

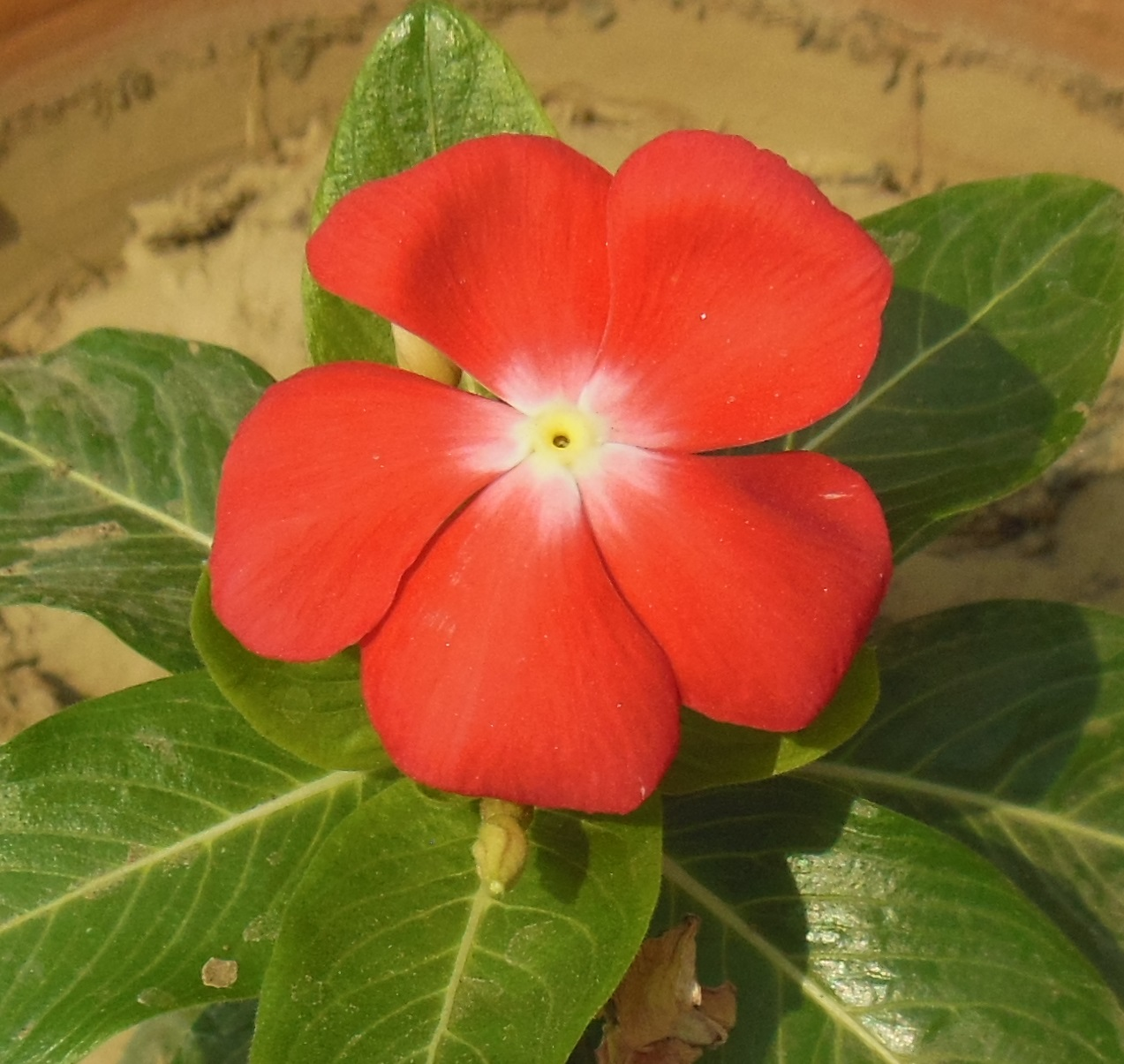
Red cultivar of Madagascar Periwinkle

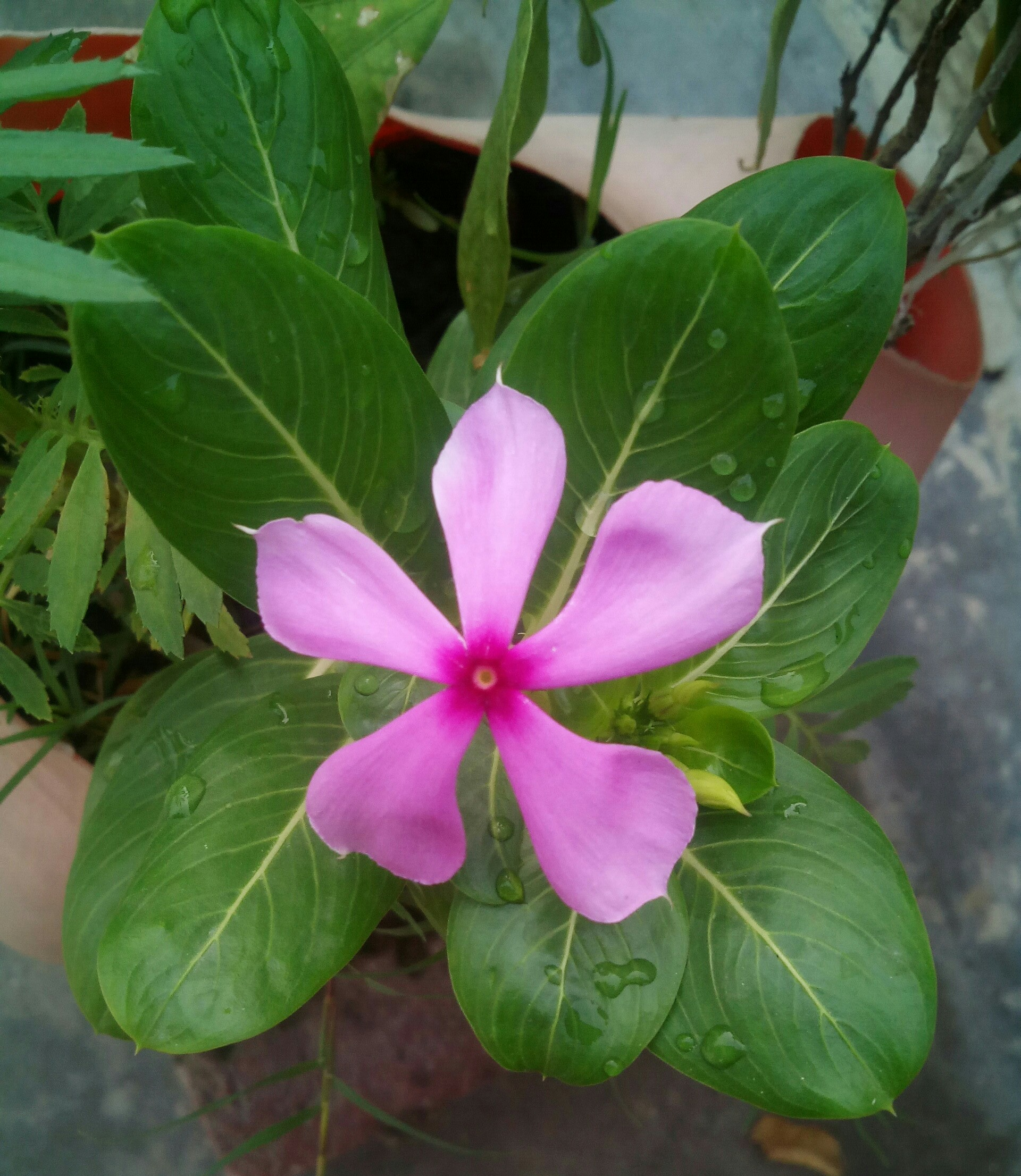
Potted Plant in New Delhi

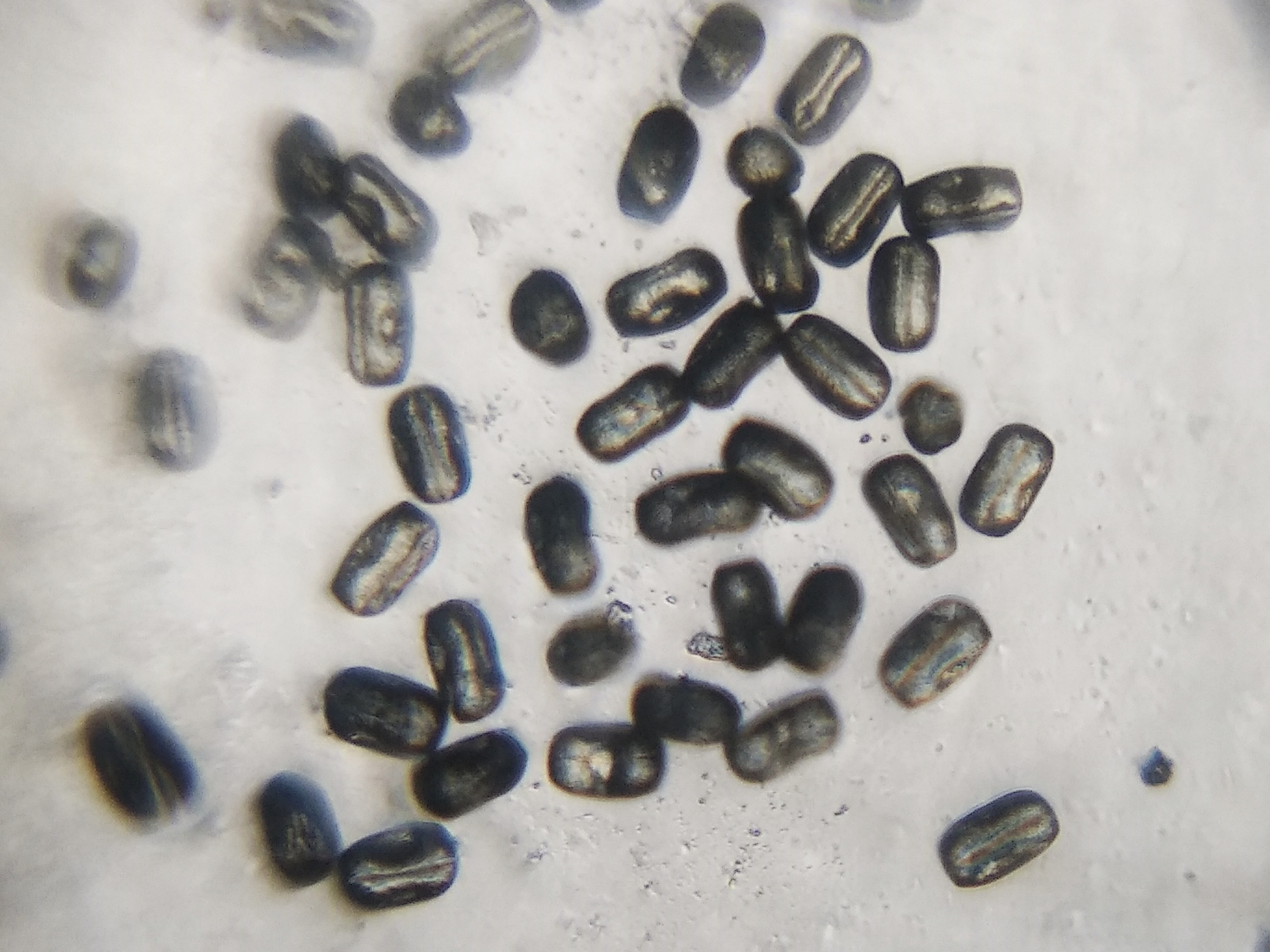
Seeds

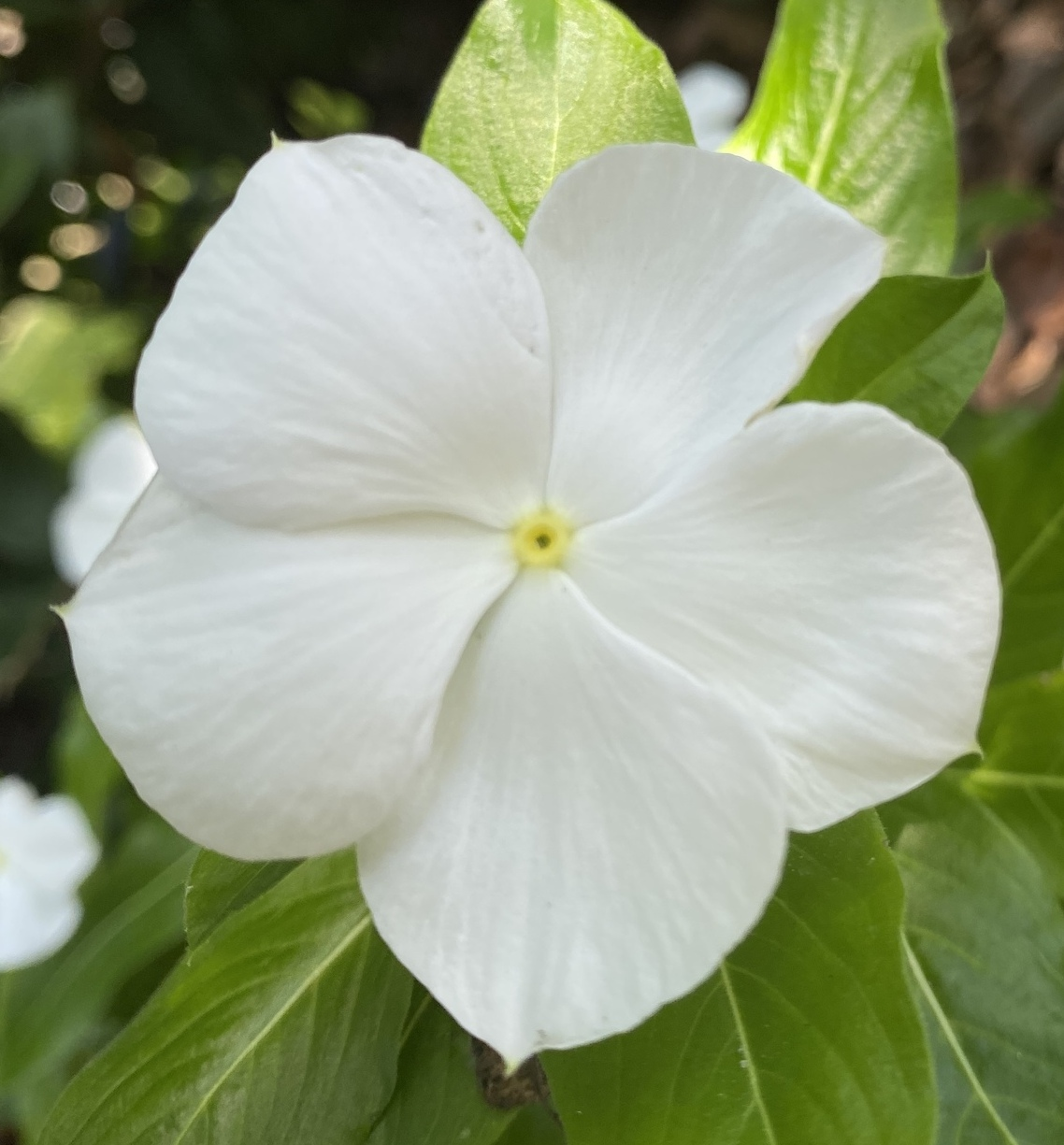
A fully bloomed white plant

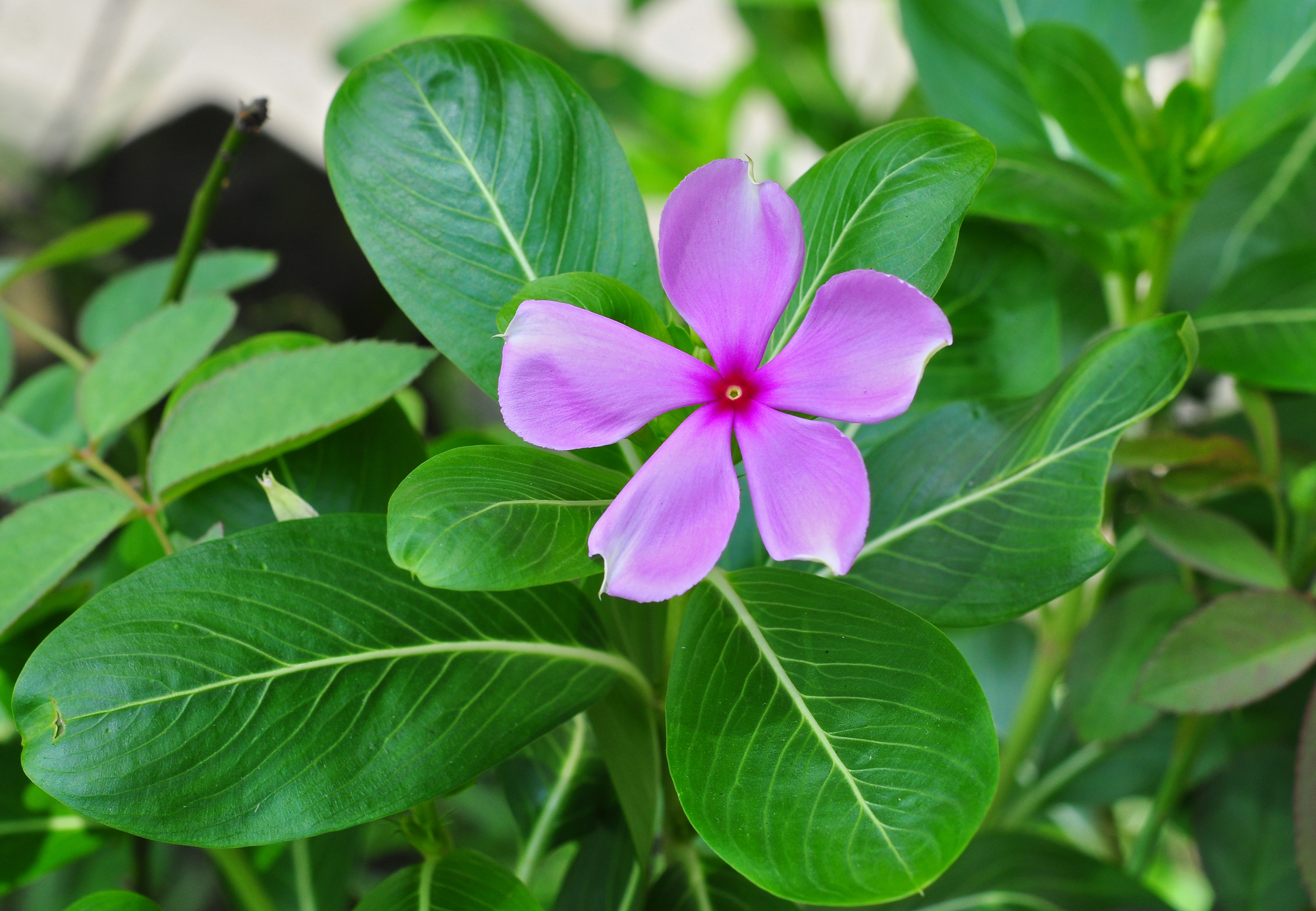

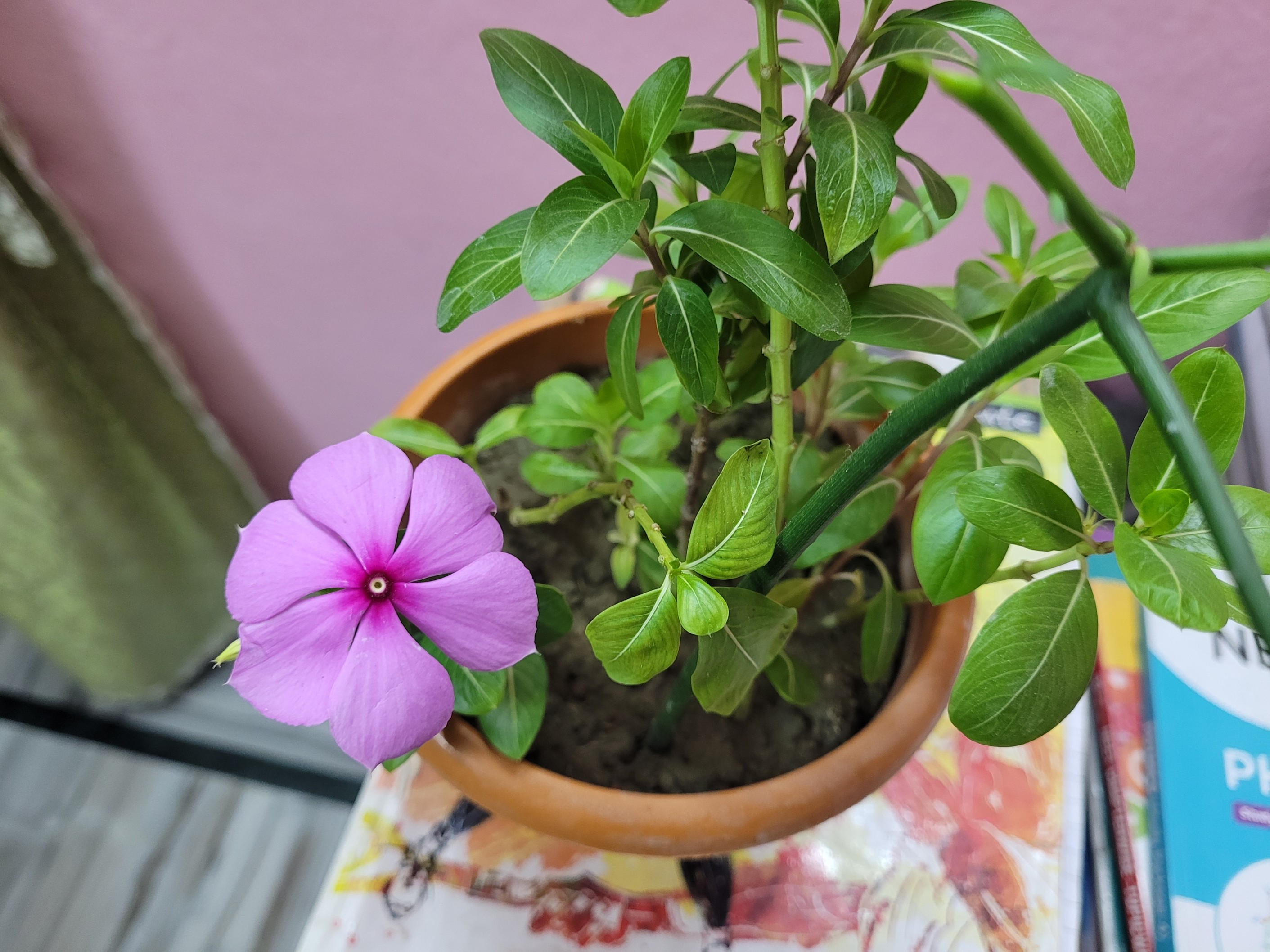
A rare mutation of Periwinkle flower which causes an additional petal(6), found in Chandannagar
