= Vincoline =

Names
- IUPAC name Methyl (20S)-2-hydroxy-6,7-didehydro-3α,20-epoxy-2β,5α,12β,19α-aspidospermidine-3β-carboxylate
- Systematic IUPAC name Methyl (3aS,3a^{1}S,4S,6R,6aS,11bR)-6a-hydroxy-4-methyl-6a,7,12,13-tetrahydro-1H,3a^{1}H,4H,6H-3a,6-methanoindolizino[1′,8′:4,5,6]oxepino[3,4-b]indole-6-carboxylate

Identifiers
CAS Number	11034-66-5
3D model (JSmol)	Interactive image
ChemSpider	2297507
PubChem CID	3032566
UNII	QLD37A79WK
CompTox Dashboard (EPA)	DTXSID60911603
- InChI: InChI=1S/C21H24N2O4/c1-13-18-8-5-10-23-11-9-19(16(18)23)14-6-3-4-7-15(14)22-21(19,25)20(12-18,27-13)17(24)26-2/h3-8,13,16,22,25H,9-12H2,1-2H3/t13-,16-,18-,19+,20-,21-/m0/s1 Key: YOQNZWXFGROKGY-KVKBDHCBSA-N; InChI=1/C21H24N2O4/c1-13-18-8-5-10-23-11-9-19(16(18)23)14-6-3-4-7-15(14)22-21(19,25)20(12-18,27-13)17(24)26-2/h3-8,13,16,22,25H,9-12H2,1-2H3/t13-,16-,18-,19+,20-,21-/m0/s1 Key: YOQNZWXFGROKGY-KVKBDHCBBE
- SMILES: C[C@H]1[C@]23C[C@@](O1)([C@]4([C@@]5([C@H]2N(CC5)CC=C3)c6ccccc6N4)O)C(=O)OC

Properties
Chemical formula	C_{21}H_{24}N_{2}O_{4}
Molar mass	368.433 g·mol^{−1}
- Except where otherwise noted, data are given for materials in their standard state (at 25 °C [77 °F], 100 kPa). Infobox references

Vincoline is an indole alkaloid isolated from Catharanthus roseus. In a mouse model, it has been found to stimulate insulin secretion.
