= Metabolic pathway =

Reactions describing metabolism

In biochemistry, a metabolic pathway is a linked series of chemical reactions occurring within a cell. The reactants, products, and intermediates of an enzymatic reaction are known as metabolites, which are modified by a sequence of chemical reactions catalyzed by enzymes. In most cases of a metabolic pathway, the product of one enzyme acts as the substrate for the next. However, side products are considered waste and removed from the cell.

Different metabolic pathways function in the position within a eukaryotic cell and the significance of the pathway in the given compartment of the cell. For instance, the electron transport chain and oxidative phosphorylation all take place in the mitochondrial membrane. In contrast, glycolysis, pentose phosphate pathway, and fatty acid biosynthesis all occur in the cytosol of a cell.

There are two types of metabolic pathways that are characterized by their ability to either synthesize molecules with the utilization of energy (anabolic pathway), or break down complex molecules and release energy in the process (catabolic pathway).

The two pathways complement each other in that the energy released from one is used up by the other. The degradative process of a catabolic pathway provides the energy required to conduct the biosynthesis of an anabolic pathway. In addition to the two distinct metabolic pathways is the amphibolic pathway, which can be either catabolic or anabolic based on the need for or the availability of energy.

Pathways are required for the maintenance of homeostasis within an organism and the flux of metabolites through a pathway is regulated depending on the needs of the cell and the availability of the substrate. The end product of a pathway may be used immediately, initiate another metabolic pathway or be stored for later use. The metabolism of a cell consists of an elaborate network of interconnected pathways that enable the synthesis and breakdown of molecules (anabolism and catabolism).

== Overview ==
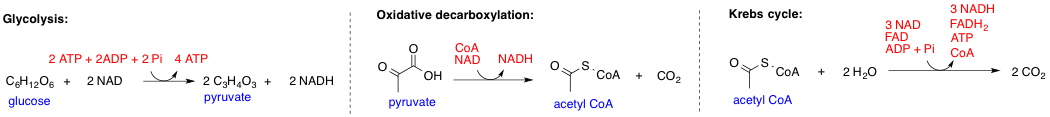
Net reactions of common metabolic pathways

Each metabolic pathway consists of a series of biochemical reactions that are connected by their intermediates: the products of one reaction are the substrates for subsequent reactions, and so on. Metabolic pathways are often considered to flow in one direction. Although all chemical reactions are technically reversible, conditions in the cell are often such that it is thermodynamically more favorable for flux to proceed in one direction of a reaction. For example, one pathway may be responsible for the synthesis of a particular amino acid, but the breakdown of that amino acid may occur via a separate and distinct pathway. One example of an exception to this "rule" is the metabolism of glucose. Glycolysis results in the breakdown of glucose, but several reactions in the glycolysis pathway are reversible and participate in the re-synthesis of glucose (gluconeogenesis).

- Glycolysis was the first metabolic pathway discovered:
1. As glucose enters a cell, it is immediately phosphorylated by ATP to glucose 6-phosphate in the irreversible first step.
2. In times of excess lipid or protein energy sources, certain reactions in the glycolysis pathway may run in reverse to produce glucose 6-phosphate, which is then used for storage as glycogen or starch.
- Metabolic pathways are often regulated by feedback inhibition.
- Some metabolic pathways flow in a 'cycle' wherein each component of the cycle is a substrate for the subsequent reaction in the cycle, such as in the Krebs Cycle (see below).
- Anabolic and catabolic pathways in eukaryotes often occur independently of each other, separated either physically by compartmentalization within organelles or separated biochemically by the requirement of different enzymes and co-factors.

== Major metabolic pathways ==

Major metabolic pathways in metro-style map. Click any text (name of pathway or metabolites) to link to the corresponding article.
Single lines: pathways common to most lifeforms. Double lines: pathways not in humans (occurs in e.g. plants, fungi, prokaryotes). Orange nodes: carbohydrate metabolism. Violet nodes: photosynthesis. Red nodes: cellular respiration. Pink nodes: cell signaling. Blue nodes: amino acid metabolism. Grey nodes: vitamin and cofactor metabolism. Brown nodes: nucleotide and protein metabolism. Green nodes: lipid metabolism.

=== Catabolic pathway (catabolism) ===
A catabolic pathway is a series of reactions that bring about a net release of energy in the form of a high energy phosphate bond formed with the energy carriers adenosine diphosphate (ADP) and guanosine diphosphate (GDP) to produce adenosine triphosphate (ATP) and guanosine triphosphate (GTP), respectively. The net reaction is, therefore, thermodynamically favorable, for it results in a lower free energy for the final products. A catabolic pathway is an exergonic system that produces chemical energy in the form of ATP, GTP, NADH, NADPH, FADH2, etc. from energy containing sources such as carbohydrates, fats, and proteins. The end products are often carbon dioxide, water, and ammonia. Coupled with an endergonic reaction of anabolism, the cell can synthesize new macromolecules using the original precursors of the anabolic pathway. An example of a coupled reaction is the phosphorylation of fructose-6-phosphate to form the intermediate fructose-1,6-bisphosphate by the enzyme phosphofructokinase accompanied by the hydrolysis of ATP in the pathway of glycolysis. The resulting chemical reaction within the metabolic pathway is highly thermodynamically favorable and, as a result, irreversible in the cell.

$\ce{Fructose-6-Phosphate + ATP -> Fructose-1,6-Bisphosphate + ADP}$

==== Cellular respiration ====
A core set of energy-producing catabolic pathways occur within all living organisms in some form. These pathways transfer the energy released by breakdown of nutrients into ATP and other small molecules used for energy (e.g. GTP, NADPH, FADH_{2}). All cells can perform anaerobic respiration by glycolysis. Additionally, most organisms can perform more efficient aerobic respiration through the citric acid cycle and oxidative phosphorylation. Additionally plants, algae and cyanobacteria are able to use sunlight to anabolically synthesize compounds from non-living matter by photosynthesis.

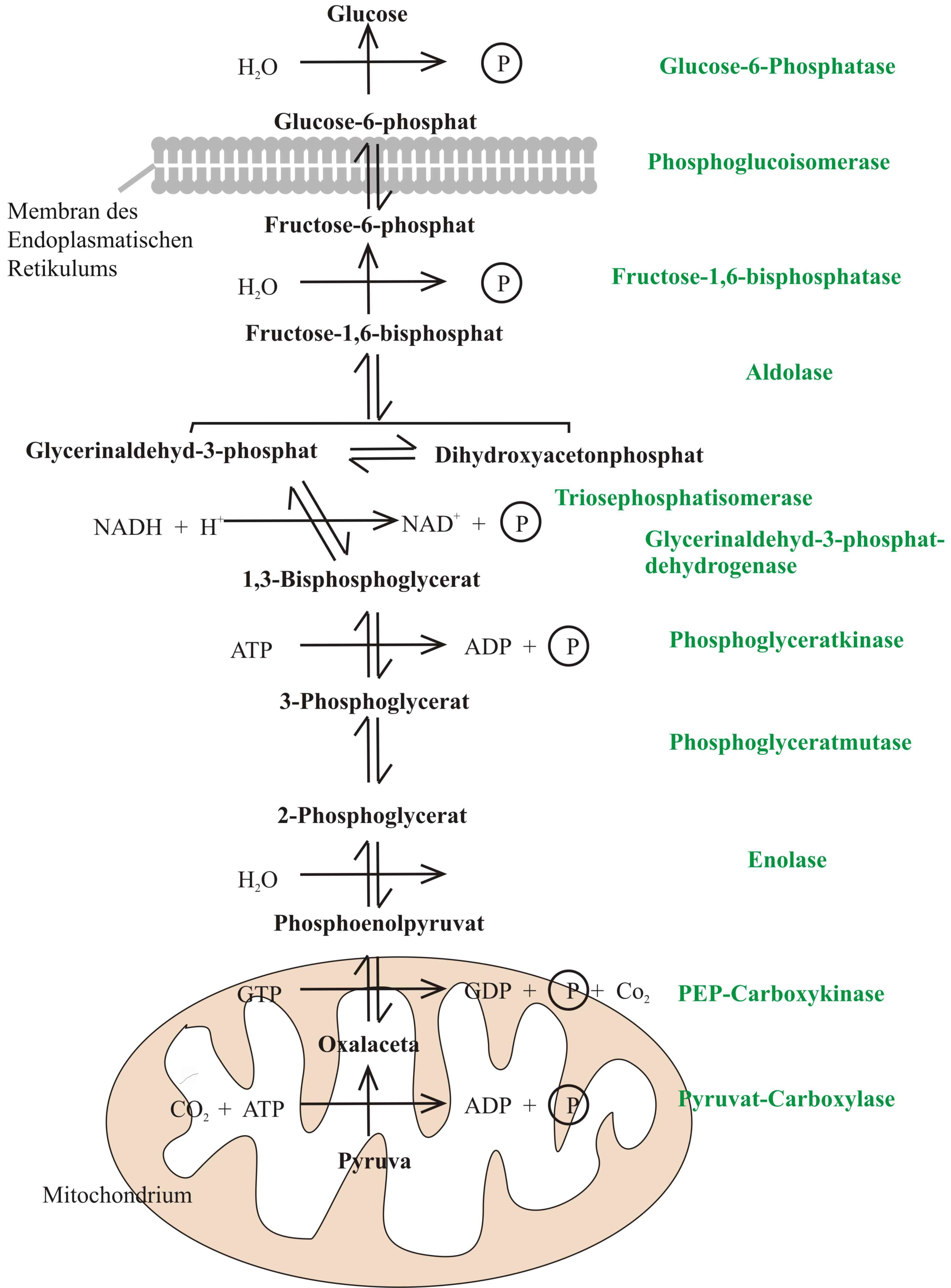
Gluconeogenesis mechanism

=== Anabolic pathway (anabolism) ===
In contrast to catabolic pathways, anabolic pathways require an energy input to construct macromolecules such as polypeptides, nucleic acids, proteins, polysaccharides, and lipids. The isolated reaction of anabolism is unfavorable in a cell due to a positive Gibbs free energy (+ΔG). Thus, an input of chemical energy through a coupling with an exergonic reaction is necessary. The coupled reaction of the catabolic pathway affects the thermodynamics of the reaction by lowering the overall activation energy of an anabolic pathway and allowing the reaction to take place. Otherwise, an endergonic reaction is non-spontaneous.

An anabolic pathway is a biosynthetic pathway, meaning that it combines smaller molecules to form larger and more complex ones. An example is the reversed pathway of glycolysis, otherwise known as gluconeogenesis, which occurs in the liver and sometimes in the kidney to maintain proper glucose concentration in the blood and supply the brain and muscle tissues with adequate amount of glucose. Although gluconeogenesis is similar to the reverse pathway of glycolysis, it contains four distinct enzymes(pyruvate carboxylase, phosphoenolpyruvate carboxykinase, fructose 1,6-bisphosphatase, glucose 6-phosphatase) from glycolysis that allow the pathway to occur spontaneously.

=== Amphibolic pathway (Amphibolism) ===
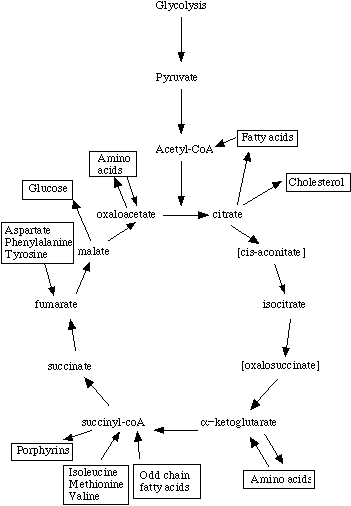
Amphibolic properties of the citric acid cycle

An amphibolic pathway is one that can be either catabolic or anabolic based on the availability of or the need for energy. The currency of energy in a biological cell is adenosine triphosphate (ATP), which stores its energy in the phosphoanhydride bonds. The energy is utilized to conduct biosynthesis, facilitate movement, and regulate active transport inside of the cell. Examples of amphibolic pathways are the citric acid cycle and the glyoxylate cycle. These sets of chemical reactions contain both energy producing and utilizing pathways. To the right is an illustration of the amphibolic properties of the TCA cycle.

The glyoxylate shunt pathway is an alternative to the tricarboxylic acid (TCA) cycle, for it redirects the pathway of TCA to prevent full oxidation of carbon compounds, and to preserve high energy carbon sources as future energy sources. This pathway occurs only in plants and bacteria and transpires in the absence of glucose molecules.

== Regulation ==
The flux of the entire pathway is regulated by the rate-determining steps. These are the slowest steps in a network of reactions. The rate-limiting step occurs near the beginning of the pathway and is regulated by feedback inhibition, which ultimately controls the overall rate of the pathway. The metabolic pathway in the cell is regulated by covalent or non-covalent modifications. A covalent modification involves an addition or removal of a chemical bond, whereas a non-covalent modification (also known as allosteric regulation) is the binding of the regulator to the enzyme via hydrogen bonds, electrostatic interactions, and Van der Waals forces.

The rate of turnover in a metabolic pathway, also known as the metabolic flux, is regulated based on the stoichiometric reaction model, the utilization rate of metabolites, and the translocation pace of molecules across the lipid bilayer. The regulation methods are based on experiments involving 13C-labeling, which is then analyzed by nuclear magnetic resonance (NMR) or gas chromatography–mass spectrometry (GC–MS)–derived mass compositions. The aforementioned techniques synthesize a statistical interpretation of mass distribution in proteinogenic amino acids to the catalytic activities of enzymes in a cell.

== Clinical applications in targeting metabolic pathways ==
=== Targeting oxidative phosphorylation ===
Metabolic pathways can be targeted for clinically therapeutic uses. Within the mitochondrial metabolic network, for instance, there are various pathways that can be targeted by compounds to prevent cancer cell proliferation. One such pathway is oxidative phosphorylation (OXPHOS) within the electron transport chain (ETC). Various inhibitors can downregulate the electrochemical reactions that take place at Complex I, II, III, and IV, thereby preventing the formation of an electrochemical gradient and downregulating the movement of electrons through the ETC. The substrate-level phosphorylation that occurs at ATP synthase can also be directly inhibited, preventing the formation of ATP that is necessary to supply energy for cancer cell proliferation. Some of these inhibitors, such as lonidamine and atovaquone, which inhibit Complex II and Complex III, respectively, are currently undergoing clinical trials for FDA approval. Other non-FDA-approved inhibitors have still shown experimental success in vitro.

=== Targeting Heme ===
Heme, an important prosthetic group present in Complexes I, II, and IV can also be targeted, since heme biosynthesis and uptake have been correlated with increased cancer progression. Various molecules can inhibit heme via different mechanisms. For instance, succinylacetone has been shown to decrease heme concentrations by inhibiting δ-aminolevulinic acid in murine erythroleukemia cells. The primary structure of heme-sequestering peptides, such as HSP1 and HSP2, can be modified to downregulate heme concentrations and reduce proliferation of non-small lung cancer cells.

=== Targeting the tricarboxylic acid cycle and glutaminolysis ===
The tricarboxylic acid cycle (TCA) and glutaminolysis can also be targeted for cancer treatment, since they are essential for the survival and proliferation of cancer cells. Ivosidenib and enasidenib, two FDA-approved cancer treatments, can arrest the TCA cycle of cancer cells by inhibiting isocitrate dehydrogenase-1 (IDH1) and isocitrate dehydrogenase-2 (IDH2), respectively. Ivosidenib is specific to acute myeloid leukemia (AML) and cholangiocarcinoma, whereas enasidenib is specific to just acute myeloid leukemia (AML).

In a clinical trial consisting of 185 adult patients with cholangiocarcinoma and an IDH-1 mutation, there was a statistically significant improvement (p<0.0001; HR: 0.37) in patients randomized to ivosidenib. Still, some of the adverse side effects in these patients included fatigue, nausea, diarrhea, decreased appetite, ascites, and anemia. In a clinical trial consisting of 199 adult patients with AML and an IDH2 mutation, 23% of patients experienced complete response (CR) or complete response with partial hematologic recovery (CRh) lasting a median of 8.2 months while on enasidenib. Of the 157 patients who required transfusion at the beginning of the trial, 34% no longer required transfusions during the 56-day time period on enasidenib. Of the 42% of patients who did not require transfusions at the beginning of the trial, 76% still did not require a transfusion by the end of the trial. Side effects of enasidenib included nausea, diarrhea, elevated bilirubin and, most notably, differentiation syndrome.

Glutaminase (GLS), the enzyme responsible for converting glutamine to glutamate via hydrolytic deamidation during the first reaction of glutaminolysis, can also be targeted. In recent years, many small molecules, such as azaserine, acivicin, and CB-839 have been shown to inhibit glutaminase, thus reducing cancer cell viability and inducing apoptosis in cancer cells. Due to its effective antitumor ability in several cancer types such as ovarian, breast and lung cancers, CB-839 is the only GLS inhibitor currently undergoing clinical studies for FDA-approval.

== Genetic engineering of metabolic pathways ==
Many metabolic pathways are of commercial interest. For instance, the production of many antibiotics or other drugs requires complex pathways. The pathways to produce such compounds can be transplanted into microbes or other more suitable organism for production purposes. For example, the world's supply of the anti-cancer drug vinblastine is produced by relatively ineffient extraction and purification of the precursors vindoline and catharanthine from the plant Catharanthus roseus, which are then chemically converted into vinblastine. The biosynthetic pathway to produce vinblastine, including 30 enzymatic steps, has been transferred into yeast cells which is a convenient system to grow in large amounts. With these genetic modifications yeast can use its own metabolites geranyl pyrophosphate and tryptophan to produce the precursors of catharanthine and vindoline. This process required 56 genetic edits, including expression of 34 heterologous genes from plants in yeast cells.

== See also ==
- KaPPA-View4 (2010)
- Metabolism
- Metabolic control analysis
- Metabolic network
- Metabolic network modelling
- Metabolic engineering
- Biochemical systems equation
- Linear biochemical pathway
