= C21H24N2O3 =

The molecular formula C_{21}H_{24}N_{2}O_{3} may refer to:

- Ajmalicine
- 16-Hydroxytabersonine
- Lochnericine
- Preakuammicine
- Raucaffrinoline
- Vobasine
