= C21H24N2O2 =

The molecular formula C_{21}H_{24}N_{2}O_{2} (molar mass: 336.427 g/mol) may refer to:

- Apovincamine, an alkaloid
- Catharanthine
- Dehydrosecodine
- LY-272,015
- S-15535, a piperazine drug
- Tabersonine
