= Stemmadenine =

Names
- IUPAC name Methyl (19E)-17-hydroxy-2,7,19,20-tetradehydro-3,7-seco-15β-curan-16-carboxylate
- Systematic IUPAC name Methyl (5E,6R,7S)-5-ethylidene-7-(hydroxymethyl)-1,4,5,6,7,8-hexahydro-2H-3,6-ethanoazonino[5,4-b]indole-7-carboxylate

Identifiers
CAS Number	10012-73-4
3D model (JSmol)	Interactive image
ChEBI	CHEBI:9260
ChEMBL	ChEMBL486212
ChemSpider	8242264
KEGG	C11691
PubChem CID	10066724
UNII	7RBX39D6AB
- InChI: InChI=1S/C21H26N2O3/c1-3-14-12-23-10-8-16-15-6-4-5-7-18(15)22-19(16)21(13-24,20(25)26-2)17(14)9-11-23/h3-7,17,22,24H,8-13H2,1-2H3/b14-3-/t17-,21+/m1/s1 Key: MBXJCHZRHROMQA-YVDMJPQFSA-N; InChI=1/C21H26N2O3/c1-3-14-12-23-10-8-16-15-6-4-5-7-18(15)22-19(16)21(13-24,20(25)26-2)17(14)9-11-23/h3-7,17,22,24H,8-13H2,1-2H3/b14-3-/t17-,21+/m1/s1 Key: MBXJCHZRHROMQA-YVDMJPQFBN
- SMILES: C/C=C\1/CN2CC[C@H]1[C@](C3=C(CC2)C4=CC=CC=C4N3)(CO)C(=O)OC

Properties
Chemical formula	C_{21}H_{26}N_{2}O_{3}
Molar mass	354.450 g·mol^{−1}
- Except where otherwise noted, data are given for materials in their standard state (at 25 °C [77 °F], 100 kPa). Infobox references

Stemmadenine is a terpene indole alkaloid. Stemmadenine is believed to be formed from preakuammicine by a carbon-carbon bond cleavage. Cleavage of a second carbon-carbon bond is thought to form dehydrosecodine. The enzymes forming stemmadenine and using it as a substrate remain unknown to date. It is thought to be intermediate compound in many different biosynthetic pathways such as in Aspidosperma species. Many alkaloids are proposed to be produced through intermediate stemmadenine. Some of them are:

- Catharanthine and Tabersonine in Catharanthus roseus
- Subincanadines D-F in Aspidosperma subincanum

It is also present as product in plant like in Tabernaemontana dichotoma seeds.

== Pharmacology ==
It has hypotensive and weak muscle relaxant properties.

== See also ==
- Secologanin
- Strictosidine
