= NMT =

NMT may refer to:

== Science and technology ==
- Nordic Mobile Telephone, an analogue mobile phone system
- Neurologic Music Therapy
- Neural machine translation
- Neuromyotonia, a form of peripheral nerve hyperexcitability
- Network management protocols, in the CANopen communication protocol
- 3-hydroxy-16-methoxy-2,3-dihydrotabersonine N-methyltransferase, an enzyme
- Glycylpeptide N-tetradecanoyltransferase, an enzyme
- N-Methyltryptamine, an alkaloid similar to dimethyltryptamine
- Non-invasive micro-test technology, a scientific research technology

== Other ==
- Needham Market railway station, UK National Rail code
- New Measurement Train, UK specialised testing train
- New Mexico Institute of Mining and Technology, a state university in New Mexico
- Nuremberg Military Tribunals, of Nazis after World War II
