= C20H24N2O =

The molecular formula C_{20}H_{24}N_{2}O (molar mass: 308.42 g/mol, exact mass: 308.1889 u) may refer to:

- Affinisine
- Indecainide
