= C22H28N2O4 =

The molecular formula C_{22}H_{28}N_{2}O_{4} may refer to:

- 3-Hydroxy-16-methoxy-2,3-dihydrotabersonine
- Isovoacristine
- Rhynchophylline
- Voacristine
- 19-Epivoacristine
- Voacangine hydroxyindolenine
