= Dimerization of catharanthine and vindoline =

Chemical process

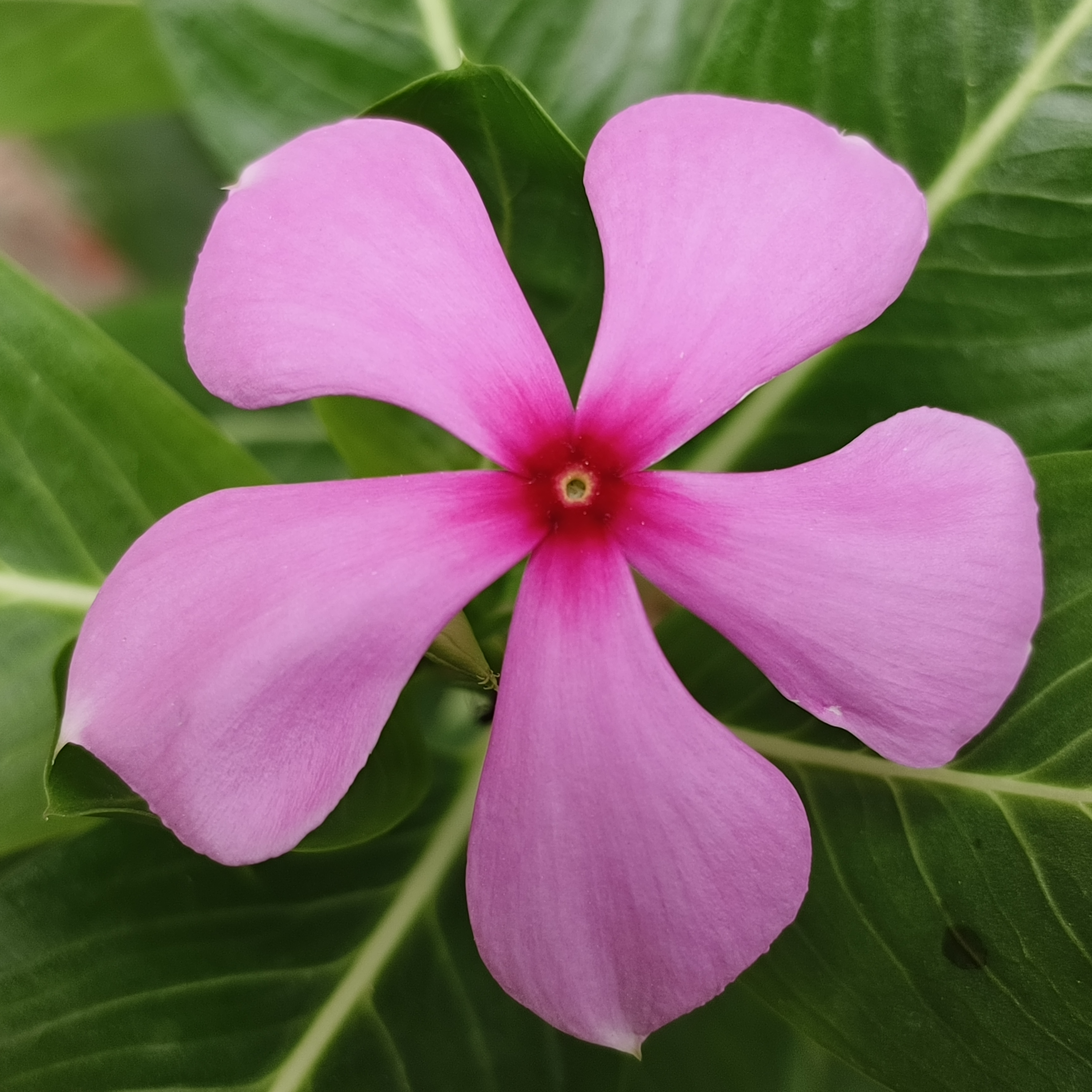
Catharanthus roseus flower (Pink Madagascar Periwinkle)

Chemical structure of catharanthine

Chemical structure of vindoline

Catharanthine and vindoline are terpenoid indole alkaloids naturally produced within the Madagascar periwinkle plant (Catharanthus roseus) whose dimerization produces the anti-cancer drugs vinblastine and vincristine. The precursor of catharanthine and vindoline is strictosidine, the common precursor of all indole alkaloids. The localization of catharanthine and vindoline within the plant tissue has been heavily studied in recent years with conflicting results. The dimerization of catharanthine and vindoline to form vinblastine and vincristine is catalyzed by a peroxidase and a reductase, and includes several intermediate compounds.

== Origin ==
The compounds catharanthine and vindoline are naturally produced within the leaves of C. roseus plants. The C. roseus plant is a member of the Apocynaceae family, which are flowering plants that are found primarily in tropical and subtropical areas of the world. C. roseus are poisonous but medically useful plants due to the various terpenoid indole alkaloids (TIAs) they produce in their leaves, roots, and flowers. The precursor of catharanthine and vindoline is strictosidine, formed by the dimerization of tryptamine and secologanin. The reaction scheme to form catharanthine and vindoline involves more than 20 enzymes, of which not all have been isolated and characterized.

== Localization ==
Catharanthine and vindoline are located predominately in the leaf tissue of C. roseus plants. In 1996-1998, three studies headed by Mariana Sottomayor from the University of Porto, Portugal localized catharanthine and vindoline in the vacuoles of the plant's cells. This claim was supported by a study in 2008. However, in 2015, a paper compiled data on the localization of TIAs within C. roseus cells from several studies reported that catharanthine is located in the upper epidermis cells of the leaf and vindoline is located in the laticifer cells of the leaf. This conclusion was both confirmed and contradicted by a recent study that used single-cell multi-omics to locate catharanthine and vindoline. This study, published in 2023, discovered the enzyme that produces catharanthine in epidermis cells and catharanthine molecules in idioblast cells. The study also discovered vindoline in idioblast cells.

== Reaction scheme ==
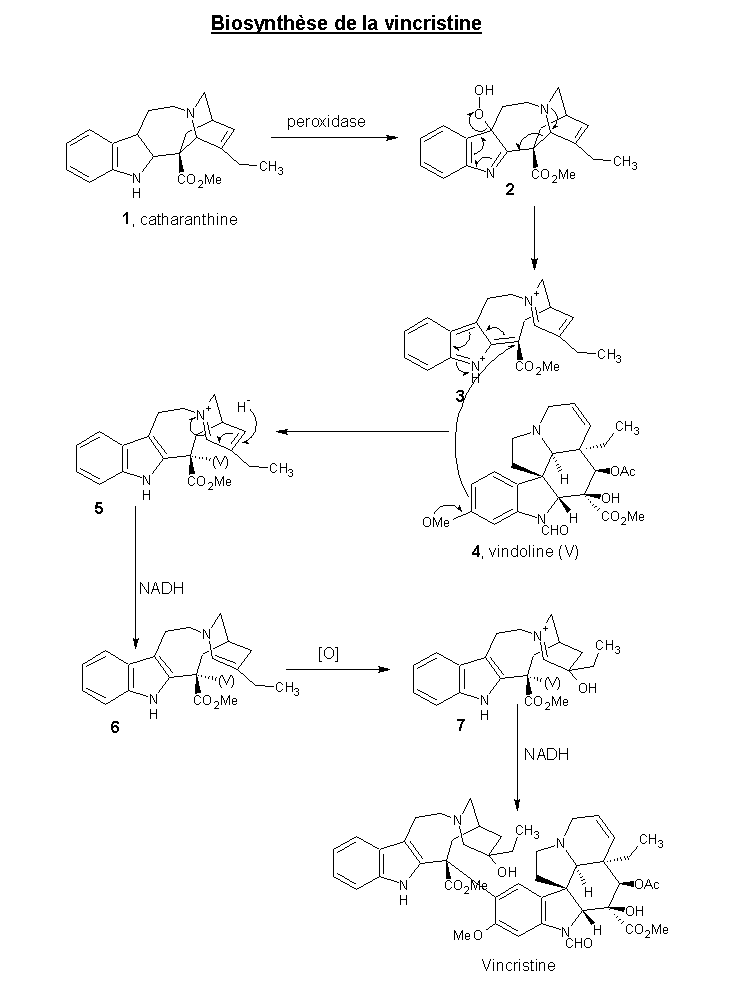
Reaction scheme between catharanthine and vindoline to form vincristine

The coupling reaction of catharanthine and vindoline begins with the activation of catharanthine by a peroxidase. This peroxidase was identified, characterized, and named CrPrx1 by the Costa group in 2008. CrPrx1 is dependent on the hydrogen peroxide naturally present in the leaf tissue to activate catharanthine. Once activated, catharanthine reacts with vindoline to form an iminium intermediate compound. A reductase reduces this compound to form alpha-3’,4’-anhydrovinblastine (AHVB). The reductase is theorized to be a tetrahydroalstonine synthase called THAS. AHVB reacts further to form vinblastine and vincristine, although this reaction scheme is yet to be fully understood.

== Limiting factors ==
The dimerization of catharanthine and vindoline produces the anti-cancer drugs vinblastine and vincristine. The natural concentrations of catharanthine and vindoline are much higher than the concentrations of vinblastine and vincristine, which suggests that the reaction between catharanthine and vindoline is a rate-limiting step in the two anti-cancer drugs’ production. It has been theorized that the dimerization of catharanthine and vindoline is limited by multiple factors, two being the availability of hydrogen peroxide and the localization of the TIAs.

The synthesis of hydrogen peroxide is heavily regulated within the leaves of C. roseus, which means that there is a natural lack of hydrogen peroxide that may limit the amount of catharanthine activated by CrPrx1. The location of catharanthine and vindoline has been heavily investigated and debated, with studies finding the TIAs in the vacuoles, epidermis cells, idioblast cells, and laticifer cells. These studies show that some level of cellular separation between the alkaloids limits their ability to interact and react to produce vinblastine and vincristine.
