= Deacetylvindoline O-acetyltransferase =

Identifiers
- EC no.: 2.3.1.107
- CAS no.: 100630-41-9

Databases
- IntEnz: IntEnz view
- BRENDA: BRENDA entry
- ExPASy: NiceZyme view
- KEGG: KEGG entry
- MetaCyc: metabolic pathway
- PRIAM: profile
- PDB structures: RCSB PDB PDBe PDBsum
- Gene Ontology: AmiGO / QuickGO
Search
- PMC: articles
- PubMed: articles
- NCBI: proteins

Deacetylvindoline O-acetyltransferase (EC 2.3.1.107) is an enzyme that catalyzes the chemical reaction

deacetylvindoline
+
acetyl-CoA
vindoline
+ coenzyme A

The two substrates of this enzyme are deacetylvindoline and acetyl-CoA. Its products are vindoline and coenzyme A. This is the final step in the biosynthesis of vindoline from tabersonine in Catharanthus roseus.

This enzyme belongs to the family of transferases, specifically those acyltransferases transferring groups other than aminoacyl groups. The systematic name of this enzyme class is acetyl-CoA:deacetylvindoline 4-O-acetyltransferase. Other names in common use include deacetylvindoline acetyltransferase, DAT, 17-O-deacetylvindoline-17-O-acetyltransferase, acetylcoenzyme A-deacetylvindoline 4-O-acetyltransferase, acetyl-CoA-17-O-deacetylvindoline 17-O-acetyltransferase, acetylcoenzyme A:deacetylvindoline 4-O-acetyltransferase, acetylcoenzyme A:deacetylvindoline O-acetyltransferase, 17-O-deacetylvindoline O-acetyltransferase, and acetyl-CoA:17-O-deacetylvindoline 17-O-acetyltransferase.
