= C23H30N2O5 =

The molecular formula C_{23}H_{30}N_{2}O_{5} (molar mass: 414.50 g/mol) may refer to:

- Deacetylvindoline
- 7-Hydroxymitragynine
- Mitragynine pseudoindoxyl
