= Deacetylvindoline =

Names
- IUPAC name Methyl 3β,4β-dihydroxy-16-methoxy-1-methyl-6,7-didehydro-2β,5α,12β,19α-aspidospermidine-3-carboxylate
- Systematic IUPAC name Methyl (3aR,3a^{1}R,4R,5S,5aR,10bR)-3b-ethyl-4,5-dihydroxy-8-methoxy-6-methyl-3a,3a^{1},4,5,5a,6,11,12-octahydro-1H-indolizino[8,1-cd]carbazole-5-carboxylate
- Other names Desacetylvindoline; 17-O-Deacetylvindoline

Identifiers
CAS Number	3633-92-9
3D model (JSmol)	Interactive image
ChEBI	CHEBI:18362
ChemSpider	228679
PubChem CID	260534
UNII	24ETH7DXT4
CompTox Dashboard (EPA)	DTXSID401032208
- InChI: InChI=1S/C23H30N2O5/c1-5-21-9-6-11-25-12-10-22(17(21)25)15-8-7-14(29-3)13-16(15)24(2)18(22)23(28,19(21)26)20(27)30-4/h6-9,13,17-19,26,28H,5,10-12H2,1-4H3/t17-,18+,19+,21+,22+,23-/m0/s1 Key: ZDKMPOJNYNVYLA-PEGGBQQISA-N; InChI=1/C23H30N2O5/c1-5-21-9-6-11-25-12-10-22(17(21)25)15-8-7-14(29-3)13-16(15)24(2)18(22)23(28,19(21)26)20(27)30-4/h6-9,13,17-19,26,28H,5,10-12H2,1-4H3/t17-,18+,19+,21+,22+,23-/m0/s1 Key: ZDKMPOJNYNVYLA-PEGGBQQIBO
- SMILES: CC[C@@]12C=CCN3[C@@H]1[C@@]4(CC3)c5ccc(cc5N([C@H]4[C@]([C@@H]2O)(C(=O)OC)O)C)OC

Properties
Chemical formula	C_{23}H_{30}N_{2}O_{5}
Molar mass	414.502 g·mol^{−1}
- Except where otherwise noted, data are given for materials in their standard state (at 25 °C [77 °F], 100 kPa). Infobox references

Deacetylvindoline is a terpene indole alkaloid produced by Catharanthus roseus. Deacetylvindoline is the product of a hydroxylation of desacetoxyvindoline by deacetoxyvindoline 4-hydroxylase (D4H). It is a substrate for deacetylvindoline O-acetyltransferase (DAT) which acetylates a hydroxy group to form vindoline, one of the two immediate precursors for the formation of the pharmacetucially valuable bisindole alkaloid vinblastine.
