= 16-Hydroxytabersonine =

Names
- IUPAC name Methyl 16-hydroxy-2,3,6,7-tetradehydro-5α,12β,19α-aspidospermidine-3-carboxylate
- Systematic IUPAC name Methyl (3aR,3a^{1}S,10bR)-3a-ethyl-8-hydroxy-3a,3a^{1},4,6,11,12-hexahydro-1H-indolizino[8,1-cd]carbazole-5-carboxylate
- Other names 11-Hydroxytabersonine

Identifiers
CAS Number	22149-28-6
3D model (JSmol)	Interactive image
ChEBI	CHEBI:17699
ChEMBL	ChEMBL2011510
ChemSpider	391562
KEGG	C11643
PubChem CID	443326
UNII	GV2G76UPD2
CompTox Dashboard (EPA)	DTXSID601032123
- InChI: InChI=1S/C21H24N2O3/c1-3-20-7-4-9-23-10-8-21(19(20)23)15-6-5-13(24)11-16(15)22-17(21)14(12-20)18(25)26-2/h4-7,11,19,22,24H,3,8-10,12H2,1-2H3/t19-,20-,21-/m0/s1 Key: FXUFRJQCBVSCRZ-ACRUOGEOSA-N; InChI=1/C21H24N2O3/c1-3-20-7-4-9-23-10-8-21(19(20)23)15-6-5-13(24)11-16(15)22-17(21)14(12-20)18(25)26-2/h4-7,11,19,22,24H,3,8-10,12H2,1-2H3/t19-,20-,21-/m0/s1 Key: FXUFRJQCBVSCRZ-ACRUOGEOBW
- SMILES: CC[C@]12CC(=C3[C@@]4([C@H]1N(CC4)CC=C2)c5ccc(cc5N3)O)C(=O)OC

Properties
Chemical formula	C_{21}H_{24}N_{2}O_{3}
Molar mass	352.434 g·mol^{−1}
- Except where otherwise noted, data are given for materials in their standard state (at 25 °C [77 °F], 100 kPa). Infobox references

16-Hydroxytabersonine is a terpene indole alkaloid produced by the plant Catharanthus roseus. The metabolite is an intermediate in the formation of vindoline, a precursor needed for formation of the pharmaceutically valuable vinblastine and vincristine. 16-hydroxytabersonine is formed from the hydroxylation of tabersonine by tabersonine 16-hydroxylase (T16H). Tabersonine 16-O-methyltransferase (16OMT) methylates the hydroxylated 16 position to form 16-methoxytabersonine.
