= Charles Thomas Beer =

Canadian organic chemist (1915–2010)

- Born: 18 November 1915; Leigh, Dorset, England
- Died: 15 June 2010 (aged 94)
- Occupation: organic chemist

Charles Thomas Beer CM (18 November 1915 – 15 June 2010) was a Canadian organic chemist who helped in the discovery of vinblastine.

Born in Leigh, Dorset, England, he received a D.Phil. in chemistry from Oxford in 1948. He came to North America in the early 1950s to the department of medical research at the University of Western Ontario to work with Robert L. Noble. Together they isolated the anti-cancer drug vinblastine from the leaves of the Madagascar periwinkle plant (vinca rosea) at the University of Western Ontario in 1958. The discovery of vinblastine is generally considered a milestone in the development of chemotherapy.

In 1960, he became professor of biochemistry at the University of British Columbia. After his retirement, he remained an honorary senior research scientist in the department of cancer endocrinology at the British Columbia Cancer Agency.

In 1997, he was inducted into the Canadian Medical Hall of Fame. In 2003, he was made a Member of the Order of Canada
