= Tabersonine 16-hydroxylase =

Class of enzymes

Identifiers
- EC no.: 1.14.14.103
- CAS no.: 250378-34-8

Databases
- BRENDA: enzyme data
- ExPASy: NiceZyme view
- KEGG: enzyme entry
- MetaCyc: metabolic pathway
- Rhea: reactions
- PDB structures: RCSB PDB PDBe PDBsum
- Gene Ontology: AmiGO / QuickGO
Search
- PMC: articles
- PubMed: articles
- NCBI: proteins

Tabersonine 16-hydroxylase (EC 1.14.14.103) is an enzyme that catalyzes the chemical reaction

Tabersonine
O_{2}
H_{2}O
16-Hydroxytabersonine

Tabersonine 16-hydroxylase is a cytochrome P450 protein containing heme, isolated from Catharanthus roseus. It requires a partner cytochrome P450 reductase for functional expression. This uses nicotinamide adenine dinucleotide phosphate. The systematic name of this enzyme class is tabersonine,NADPH:oxygen oxidoreductase (16-hydroxylating). Other names in common use include tabersonine-11-hydroxylase, and T11H. It participates in indole alkaloid biosynthesis leading to vindoline.
