= C20H24N2O2 =

The molecular formula C_{20}H_{24}N_{2}O_{2} (molar mass: 324.42 g/mol, exact mass: 324.1838 u) may refer to:

- Affinine
- Quinidine
- Quinine
