= Tabersonine 16-O-methyltransferase =

Identifiers
- EC no.: 2.1.1.94
- CAS no.: 100984-95-0

Databases
- IntEnz: IntEnz view
- BRENDA: BRENDA entry
- ExPASy: NiceZyme view
- KEGG: KEGG entry
- MetaCyc: metabolic pathway
- PRIAM: profile
- PDB structures: RCSB PDB PDBe PDBsum
- Gene Ontology: AmiGO / QuickGO
Search
- PMC: articles
- PubMed: articles
- NCBI: proteins

Tabersonine 16-O-methyltransferase (EC 2.1.1.94) is an enzyme that catalyzes the chemical reaction

16-Hydroxytabersonine
+ SAM
16-Methoxytabersonine
+ SAH

This is a methylation reaction in which the indole alkaloid, 16-hydroxytabersonine, is converted to 16-methoxytabersonine in Catharanthus roseus. The methyl group comes from the cofactor, S-adenosyl methionine (SAM), which becomes S-adenosyl-L-homocysteine (SAH).

This enzyme belongs to the family of transferases, specifically those transferring one-carbon group methyltransferases. The systematic name of this enzyme class is S-adenosyl-L-methionine:16-hydroxytabersonine 16-O-methyltransferase. Other names in common use include 11-demethyl-17-deacetylvindoline 11-methyltransferase, 11-O-demethyl-17-O-deacetylvindoline O-methyltransferase, S-adenosyl-L-methionine:11-O-demethyl-17-O-deacetylvindoline, and 11-O-methyltransferase. This enzyme participates in terpene indole and ipecac alkaloid biosynthesis.
