= Desacetoxyvindoline 4-hydroxylase =

Identifiers
- EC no.: 1.14.11.20
- CAS no.: 132084-83-4

Databases
- IntEnz: IntEnz view
- BRENDA: BRENDA entry
- ExPASy: NiceZyme view
- KEGG: KEGG entry
- MetaCyc: metabolic pathway
- PRIAM: profile
- PDB structures: RCSB PDB PDBe PDBsum
- Gene Ontology: AmiGO / QuickGO
Search
- PMC: articles
- PubMed: articles
- NCBI: proteins

Desacetoxyvindoline 4-hydroxylase (EC 1.14.11.20) is an enzyme that catalyzes the chemical reaction

desacetoxyvindoline
Fe(IV)=O
Fe(II)
deacetylvindoline

The two substrates of this enzyme are desacetoxyvindoline and oxygen. Its product is deacetylvindoline.

The enzyme is an alpha-ketoglutarate-dependent hydroxylase with systematic name desacetoxyvindoline,2-oxoglutarate:oxygen oxidoreductase (4beta-hydroxylating). Other names in common use include desacetoxyvindoline 4-hydroxylase, desacetyoxyvindoline-17-hydroxylase, D17H, desacetoxyvindoline,2-oxoglutarate:oxygen oxidoreductase, and (4beta-hydroxylating). It is a non-heme iron protein with ferryl active site where Fe(IV)=O is the species that transfers its oxygen to the substrate.

The mechanism of action requires 2-oxoglutaric acid to activate the iron oxygen complex, and this gives succinic acid and carbon dioxide when the second atom of the molecular oxygen is removed. Ascorbic acid improves the turnover number of the enzyme.

2-oxoglutaric acid
[O]
CO_{2}
succinic acid

The enzyme is part of the biosynthetic pathway to indole and ipecac alkaloids.
