= Harvey Club of London =

Oldest active medical club in Canada

The Harvey Club of London
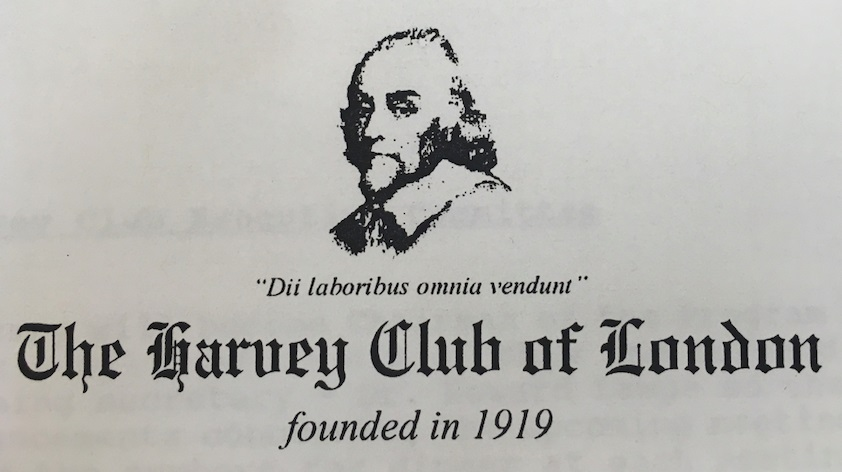
- Letterhead of the Harvey Club of London
- Established: 1919; 107 years ago
- Founder: James W. Crane
- Founded at: London, Ontario
- Type: Medical Society
- Purpose: Education
- Location: The University of Western Ontario, London, Ontario
- President: Achal Dhir
- President: Shalini Dhir
- Past President: Alp Sener
- President Elect: Paul Adams
- Website: The Harvey Club of London

The Harvey Club of London is the oldest currently active medical club in Canada. It was founded by Drs. James W. Crane and C.M. Crawford in 1919 in London, Ontario. The club was initially founded as a way for practicing physicians to stay abreast of new developments in biomedical sciences, analogous to the modern concept of continuing medical education, a function that it continues to perform with annual presentations of papers. The club also provides academic and financial support to students at the medical school of Western University.

== Origins ==
In response to a number of requests to have a medical refresher course, Dr. James W. Crane and others founded the Harvey club in 1919, at the end of the first World War. Annual dinner meetings were held initially at Tecumseh house in London, Ontario, where members would present papers. The club was named after William Harvey, renowned English physician and physiologist, famous for the detailed description of the systemic circulation as a closed circuit.

In addition to presentations, the club briefly published papers into a locally distributed journal, The Bulletin of Harvey Club, which was republished in the Canadian Medical Association Journal. More commonly, papers presented at the Harvey Club are published in other journals.

The motto of the club is "Dii laboribus omnia vendunt" which is Latin for "the Gods sell everything for effort". It may originate from epigrams published in 1666 by Antoine-Ferdinand Van Vlaenderen. Members of the club personify William Harvey, as a physician scientist, by using the appellation “Harvey”, when addressing each other at meetings. The gavel used at meetings is made of wood from Harvey House in Folkestone, Kent. A toast to William Harvey is given at the club’s annual Harvey Oration dinner on April 1, Harvey's birthday. The club president replies to the toast with a speech in which he impersonates Harvey.

== The Harvey Club Today ==
The Harvey Club meets four times a year to present papers related to developments relevant to medicine related to the sciences, humanities, and world events. The club provides a scholarship for medical students studying at Western University. The Harvey Club of London Prize is awarded to the medical student with the best paper presented on the history of medicine. The award has a financial component, and the name of the recipient is engraved on a silver plate.

== Notable Members ==
- Dr. Charles George Drake CC
- Dr. Murray Barr OC
- Dr. Robert Noble OC
- Dr. Douglas Bocking CM
- Dr. Ramsay Gunton CM
- Dr. Cecil Rorabeck OC
- Dr. William J. Wall CM
- Dr. Vivian C. McAlister OC
- Dr. M. Lee Myers CM

== Honorary Members ==
- Sir Frederick Banting
- Leonard Rowntree
- Michael Bliss
- Lord Darzi of Denham
- Alan Shepard

== Other notable medical associations named after William Harvey ==
The Harveian Society of Edinburgh was founded in 1782 by Dr Andrew Duncan. The Society holds an annual Festival in honour of Harvey in either the Royal College of Physicians of Edinburgh. At the annual Festival, an oration is given by the President to commemorate Harvey's life and work.

The Harveian Society of London is a medical society founded in 1831 based in The Medical Society of London, Chandos Street, in Cavendish Square.

The Royal College of Physicians of London holds an annual lecture, established by William Harvey in 1656, called the Harveian Oration.

The Harvey Society, founded in 1905, is based in New York City and hosts an annual lecture series on recent advances in biomedical sciences.
