= KaPPA-View4 =

Content
- Description: metabolic pathway database

Contact
- Laboratory: Kazusa DNA Research Institute
- Authors: Nozomu Sakurai
- Primary citation: Sakurai & al. (2011)
- Release date: 2010

Access
- Website: http://kpv.kazusa.or.jp/kpv4/

KaPPA-View4 is a metabolic pathway database containing data about metabolic regulation from 'omics' data.

== See also ==
- Metabolic pathway
