= Leonard Rowntree =

Canadian physician and medical researcher

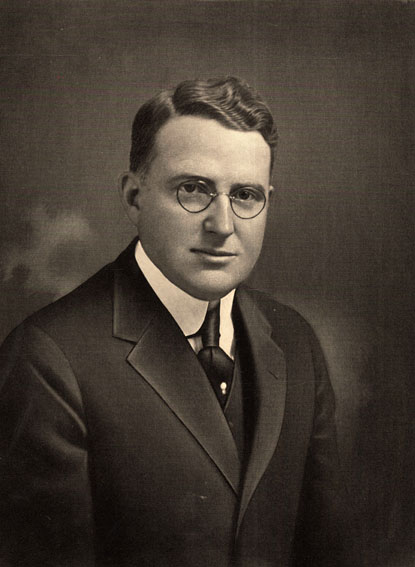
Dr. Leonard G. Rowntree

Leonard George Rowntree (1883–1959) was a Canadian physician and medical researcher who was credited with founding the research tradition at the Mayo Clinic. He is most well known for pioneering kidney research including the Rowntree test for kidney function; dialysis; the intravenous pyelogram and plasmapheresis. Rowntree was awarded the Medal for Merit in 1946.

== Early life ==
Rowntree was born in London, Ontario, on April 10, 1883. He entered University of Western Ontario medical school in 1901, graduating in 1905 with the gold medal. He interned at Victoria Hospital and then entered general practice in Camden, New Jersey. A year later he attended a lecture given by William Osler in Philadelphia. He approached Osler about his career.

== Academic career ==
Osler recommended Rowntree to Johns Hopkins Hospital where he worked with John J. Abel, a prominent pharmacologist. Abel introduced him to phthalein, from which he and J. T. Geraghty developed the Rowntree test of renal function. With Norman Keith of Toronto, Rowntree invented a method to calculate blood and plasma volume using a red dye dilution method. Abel and Rowntree also developed the first artificial kidney, also known as dialysis, in 1913. From 1915 to 1918, Rowntree was head of medicine at the University of Minnesota. The next year the team described plasmapheresis. In 1918, he joined the US Army where he led studies of aviation medicine. That year William James Mayo saved his life by performing surgery on him for a perforated ulcer. In 1920, Rowntree was made Head of Section and Professor of Medicine of the Mayo Foundation. He recruited what became known as the "Rowntree group" to the Mayo Clinic including Norman Keith of Toronto, Samuel Amberg of Chicago, and Reginald Fitz of Boston, all of whom had been collaborators with his at Hopkins, and later Henry Helmholtz, George Brown, Walter Alvarez, Russell Wilder, Stanley McVicar, Albert M. Snell, Jay Bargen, Carl Greene, Philip Hench, Bayard Horton. During his 12 years at the clinic, he published more than 100 articles, primarily in the fields of endocrine disease, water metabolism, and hepatology including the treatment of Addison's disease with adrenal extracts and the radiological technique to xray the kidneys known as the intravenous pyelogram. He is also considered one of the first hematopathologists for his work on measurement of blood volume in patients with polycythemia. Rowntree left the Mayo clinic in 1932 to continue his illustrious career in medicine as director of the Philadelphia Institute for Medical Research. During WW II, Rowntree with two colleagues presented information on the physical status of Selective Service registrants; he also considered the information's implications for health needs.

== History of Medicine ==
In 1911, Rowntree explored the sites of James Parkinson's life in London. He commented that Parkinson had been forgotten even though he had described the eponymous condition known as Parkinson's disease Rowntree's life of James Parkinson has been the basis of biographies since then.

== Awards and distinctions ==
Rowntree was elected an honorary member of the Harvey Club of London in 1922. The University of Western Ontario awarded him an honorary Doctor of Science degree in 1916 and established the annual Rowntree prize to the best essay on the history of medicine by a medical student. In 1944, he won the Banting Medal of the American Diabetes Association. In 1946, President Harry Truman awarded Rowntree the Medal for Merit for his work as chief of the medical division of the Selective Service System from 1940 to 1945.
