= 3-Hydroxy-16-methoxy-2,3-dihydrotabersonine =

Names
- IUPAC name Methyl 3β-hydroxy-16-methoxy-6,7-didehydro-2β,5α,12β,19α-aspidospermidine-3α-carboxylate
- Systematic IUPAC name Methyl (3aR,3a^{1}S,5R,5aR,10bS)-3a-ethyl-5-hydroxy-8-methoxy-3a,3a^{1},4,5,5a,6,11,12-octahydro-1H-indolizino[8,1-cd]carbazole-5-carboxylate

Identifiers
3D model (JSmol)	Interactive image
ChEBI	CHEBI:18430
ChemSpider	389344
KEGG	C04578
PubChem CID	440391
CompTox Dashboard (EPA)	DTXSID801032200
- InChI: InChI=1S/C22H28N2O4/c1-4-20-8-5-10-24-11-9-21(18(20)24)15-7-6-14(27-2)12-16(15)23-17(21)22(26,13-20)19(25)28-3/h5-8,12,17-18,23,26H,4,9-11,13H2,1-3H3/t17-,18+,20+,21+,22-/m1/s1 Key: MLIQIRKAHMVCDD-MMGCJVFTSA-N; InChI=1/C22H28N2O4/c1-4-20-8-5-10-24-11-9-21(18(20)24)15-7-6-14(27-2)12-16(15)23-17(21)22(26,13-20)19(25)28-3/h5-8,12,17-18,23,26H,4,9-11,13H2,1-3H3/t17-,18+,20+,21+,22-/m1/s1 Key: MLIQIRKAHMVCDD-MMGCJVFTBW
- SMILES: CC[C@]12C[C@@]([C@H]3[C@@]4([C@H]1N(CC4)CC=C2)c5ccc(cc5N3)OC)(C(=O)OC)O

Properties
Chemical formula	C_{22}H_{28}N_{2}O_{4}
Molar mass	384.476 g·mol^{−1}
- Except where otherwise noted, data are given for materials in their standard state (at 25 °C [77 °F], 100 kPa). Infobox references

3-Hydroxy-16-methoxy-2,3-dihydrotabersonine is a terpene indole alkaloid produced by Catharanthus roseus. The metabolite is a substrate for 3-hydroxy-16-methoxy-2,3-dihydrotabersonine N-methyltransferase (NMT) which transfers a methyl group to the nitrogen of the indole ring forming desacetoxyvindoline. The enzyme catalyzing the formation of 3-hydroxy-16-methoxy-2,3-dihydrotabersonine from 16-methoxytabersonine is currently unknown, but is a result of hydration of the double bond connecting the 6 and 13 position carbons.
