= Affinisine =

Names
- IUPAC name 1-Methylsarpagan-17-ol
- Systematic IUPAC name [(6S,9E,10R,11R,12S)-9-Ethylidene-5-methyl-5,6,7,8,9,10,11,11a,12-decahydro-6,10-methanoindolo[2,3-g]quinolizin-11-yl]methanol
- Other names De(hydroxymethyl)voachalotinol

Identifiers
CAS Number	2912-11-0
3D model (JSmol)	Interactive image
ChemSpider	10172574
PubChem CID	12000107
UNII	J96TYR7CHG
CompTox Dashboard (EPA)	DTXSID201045726
- InChI: InChI=1S/C20H24N2O/c1-3-12-10-22-18-9-15-13-6-4-5-7-17(13)21(2)20(15)19(22)8-14(12)16(18)11-23/h3-7,14,16,18-19,23H,8-11H2,1-2H3/b12-3-/t14-,16+,18-,19-/m0/s1 Key: UVWQYWHKTZABSO-ILADVTTDSA-N; InChI=1S/C20H24N2O/c1-3-12-10-22-18-9-15-13-6-4-5-7-17(13)21(2)20(15)19(22)8-14(12)16(18)11-23/h3-7,14,16,18-19,23H,8-11H2,1-2H3/b12-3-/t14-,16+,18-,19-/m0/s1 Key: UVWQYWHKTZABSO-ILADVTTDSA-N
- SMILES: CN1C2=C(C=CC=C2)C3=C1[C@@](C[C@@]4([H])/C(C5)=C\C)([H])[N@]5[C@@]([C@@]([H])4CO)([H])C3

Properties
Chemical formula	C_{20}H_{24}N_{2}O
Molar mass	308.425 g·mol^{−1}
- Except where otherwise noted, data are given for materials in their standard state (at 25 °C [77 °F], 100 kPa). Infobox references

Affinisine is a monoterpenoid indole alkaloid which can be isolated from plants of the genus Tabernaemontana. Structurally, it can be considered a member of the sarpagine alkaloid family and may be synthesized from tryptophan via a Pictet-Spengler reaction.

== Pharmacology ==
Limited pharmacological testing has indicated that affinisine may effectively inhibit acetylcholinesterase and butyrylcholinesterase.

== See also ==
- Affinine
- 19-Epivoacristine
