= 16-Methoxytabersonine =

Names
- IUPAC name Methyl 16-methoxy-2,3,6,7-tetradehydro-5α,12β,19α-aspidospermidine-3-carboxylate
- Systematic IUPAC name Methyl (3aR,3a^{1}S,10bS)-3a-ethyl-8-methoxy-3a,3a^{1},4,6,11,12-hexahydro-1H-indolizino[8,1-cd]carbazole-5-carboxylate
- Other names Ervamycine

Identifiers
CAS Number	27773-39-3
3D model (JSmol)	Interactive image
ChEBI	CHEBI:769
ChEMBL	ChEMBL1165751
ChemSpider	391592
KEGG	C11675
PubChem CID	443356
UNII	VX294XSR6T
CompTox Dashboard (EPA)	DTXSID301032205
- InChI: InChI=1S/C22H26N2O3/c1-4-21-8-5-10-24-11-9-22(20(21)24)16-7-6-14(26-2)12-17(16)23-18(22)15(13-21)19(25)27-3/h5-8,12,20,23H,4,9-11,13H2,1-3H3/t20-,21-,22-/m0/s1 Key: AEXBRBWRPNGGEZ-FKBYEOEOSA-N; InChI=1/C22H26N2O3/c1-4-21-8-5-10-24-11-9-22(20(21)24)16-7-6-14(26-2)12-17(16)23-18(22)15(13-21)19(25)27-3/h5-8,12,20,23H,4,9-11,13H2,1-3H3/t20-,21-,22-/m0/s1 Key: AEXBRBWRPNGGEZ-FKBYEOEOBC
- SMILES: CC[C@]12CC(=C3[C@@]4([C@H]1N(CC4)CC=C2)c5ccc(cc5N3)OC)C(=O)OC

Properties
Chemical formula	C_{22}H_{26}N_{2}O_{3}
Molar mass	366.461 g·mol^{−1}
- Except where otherwise noted, data are given for materials in their standard state (at 25 °C [77 °F], 100 kPa). Infobox references

16-Methoxytabersonine is a terpene indole alkaloid produced by the medicinal plant Catharanthus roseus. 16-methoxytabersonine is synthesized by methylation of the hydroxyl group at the 16 position of 16-hydroxytabersonine by tabersonine 16-O-methyltransferase (16OMT). The compound is a substrate for hydration by two concerted enzymes Tabersonine-3-Oxidase (T3O) and Tabersonine-3-Reductase (T3R), which leads to the formation of 3-hydroxy-16-methoxy-2,3-dihydrotabersonine.
