= Catharanthine =

Names
- IUPAC name Methyl 3,4-didehydroibogamine-18-carboxylate
- Systematic IUPAC name Methyl (6R,6aR,9S)-7-ethyl-9,10,12,13-tetrahydro-5H-6,9-methanopyrido[1′,2′:1,2]azepino[4,5-b]indole-6(6aH)-carboxylate

Identifiers
CAS Number	2468-21-5
3D model (JSmol)	Interactive image
ChEBI	CHEBI:3469
ChemSpider	4572197
ECHA InfoCard	100.017.806
PubChem CID	5458190
UNII	WT0YJV846J
CompTox Dashboard (EPA)	DTXSID80947621
- InChI: InChI=1S/C21H24N2O2/c1-3-14-10-13-11-21(20(24)25-2)18-16(8-9-23(12-13)19(14)21)15-6-4-5-7-17(15)22-18/h4-7,10,13,19,22H,3,8-9,11-12H2,1-2H3/t13-,19+,21-/m0/s1 Key: CMKFQVZJOWHHDV-NQZBTDCJSA-N; InChI=1/C21H24N2O2/c1-3-14-10-13-11-21(20(24)25-2)18-16(8-9-23(12-13)19(14)21)15-6-4-5-7-17(15)22-18/h4-7,10,13,19,22H,3,8-9,11-12H2,1-2H3/t13-,19+,21-/m0/s1 Key: CMKFQVZJOWHHDV-NQZBTDCJBW
- SMILES: CCC1=C[C@H]2C[C@]3([C@@H]1N(C2)CCc4c3[nH]c5c4cccc5)C(=O)OC

Properties
Chemical formula	C_{21}H_{24}N_{2}O_{2}
Molar mass	336.435 g·mol^{−1}
- Except where otherwise noted, data are given for materials in their standard state (at 25 °C [77 °F], 100 kPa). Infobox references

Catharanthine is a terpene indole alkaloid produced by the medicinal plant Catharanthus roseus and Tabernaemontana divaricata. Catharanthine is derived from strictosidine, but the exact mechanism by which this happens is currently unknown. Catharanthine is one of the two precursors that form vinblastine, the other being vindoline.

== Pharmacology ==
(+)-Catharanthine competitively inhibits α9α10 nAChRs with potencies higher than that at α3β4 and α4β2 nAChRs and directly blocks Ca_{V}2.2. Catharanthine alkaloids are non competitive antagonist of muscle type nAChRs and this is thought to be the case due to presence of catharanthine moiety in those compounds. In in vitro study, it increased the levels of cAMP by inhibiting cAMP phosphodiesterase in brain. It is a potent inhibitor of TRPM8, similar to BCTC. Structural analysis of catharanthine shows activity on TRPM8, TRPA1, and butyrylcholinesterase.

== See also ==
- Akuammicine
- Conopharyngine
- Stemmadenine
- Tabersonine
- Dimerization of catharanthine and vindoline
- Catharanthalog
