= 19-Epivoacristine =

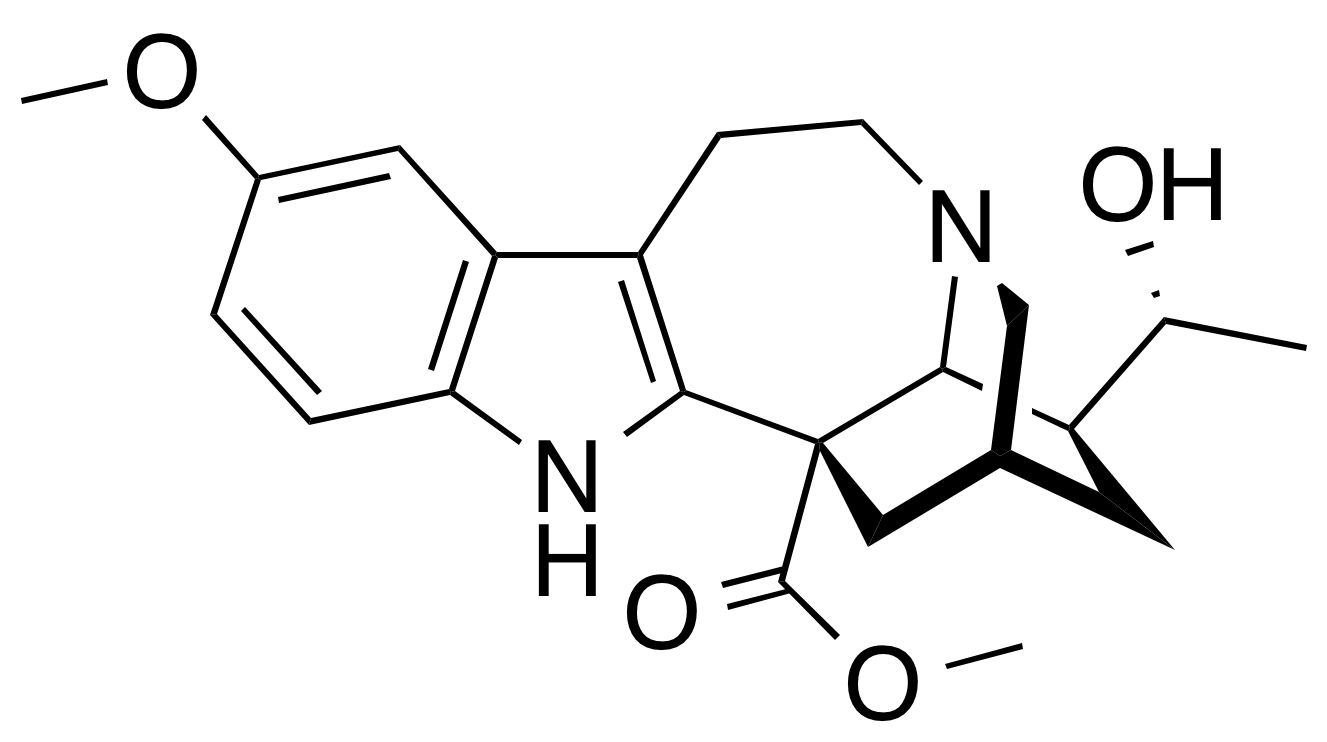

Names
- IUPAC name Methyl (20R)-20-hydroxy-12-methoxyibogamine-18-carboxylate
- Systematic IUPAC name Methyl (6S,6aS,7S,9R)-7-[(1R)-1-hydroxyethyl]-2-methoxy-7,8,9,10,12,13-hexahydro-5H-6,9-methanopyrido[1′,2′:1,2]azepino[4,5-b]indole-6(6aH)-carboxylate
- Other names 20-Epivoacangarine; 19-Epi-voacangarine

Identifiers
CAS Number	6883-77-8
3D model (JSmol)	Interactive image
ChemSpider	57523176
PubChem CID	56842093
CompTox Dashboard (EPA)	DTXSID70218938
- InChI: InChI=1S/C22H28N2O4/c1-12(25)16-8-13-10-22(21(26)28-3)19-15(6-7-24(11-13)20(16)22)17-9-14(27-2)4-5-18(17)23-19/h4-5,9,12-13,16,20,23,25H,6-8,10-11H2,1-3H3/t12-,13-,16-,20+,22-/m1/s1 Key: OYMQKBZMKFJPMH-MDIKWQLESA-N
- SMILES: C[C@H]([C@H]1C[C@@H]2C[C@@]3([C@H]1N(C2)CCC4=C3NC5=C4C=C(C=C5)OC)C(=O)OC)O

Properties
Chemical formula	C_{22}H_{28}N_{2}O_{4}
Molar mass	384.476 g·mol^{−1}
- Except where otherwise noted, data are given for materials in their standard state (at 25 °C [77 °F], 100 kPa). Infobox references

19-Epivoacristine is an indole alkaloid found in different species of Tabernaemontana, such as Tabernaemontana dichotoma, as well as in Peschiera affinis. It is also known as 20-epivoacangarine and 19-epi-voacangarine.

== Potential pharmacology ==
19-Epivoacristine may be a selective acetylcholinesterase (AChE) inhibitor in vitro.

== Chemistry ==
19-Epivoacristine can be prepared by potassium borohydride reduction of voacryptine.

== See also ==
- Voacristine
- Voacamine
- Apparicine
- Lochnericine
