= Desacetoxyvindoline =

Names
- IUPAC name Methyl 3-hydroxy-16-methoxy-1-methyl-6,7-didehydro-2β,5α,12β,19α-aspidospermidine-3β-carboxylate
- Systematic IUPAC name Methyl (3aR,3a^{1}S,5R,5aR,10bR)-3a-ethyl-5-hydroxy-8-methoxy-6-methyl-3a,3a^{1},4,5,5a,6,11,12-octahydro-1H-indolizino[8,1-cd]carbazole-5-carboxylate
- Other names Deacetoxyvindoline

Identifiers
CAS Number	105119-60-6
3D model (JSmol)	Interactive image
ChEBI	CHEBI:16957
ChemSpider	388838
KEGG	C02673
PubChem CID	439783
CompTox Dashboard (EPA)	DTXSID901032203
- InChI: InChI=1S/C23H30N2O4/c1-5-21-9-6-11-25-12-10-22(18(21)25)16-8-7-15(28-3)13-17(16)24(2)19(22)23(27,14-21)20(26)29-4/h6-9,13,18-19,27H,5,10-12,14H2,1-4H3/t18-,19+,21-,22+,23+/m0/s1 Key: WNKDGPXNFMMOEJ-RNJSZURPSA-N; InChI=1/C23H30N2O4/c1-5-21-9-6-11-25-12-10-22(18(21)25)16-8-7-15(28-3)13-17(16)24(2)19(22)23(27,14-21)20(26)29-4/h6-9,13,18-19,27H,5,10-12,14H2,1-4H3/t18-,19+,21-,22+,23+/m0/s1 Key: WNKDGPXNFMMOEJ-RNJSZURPBV
- SMILES: CC[C@]12C[C@@]([C@H]3[C@@]4([C@H]1N(CC4)CC=C2)c5ccc(cc5N3C)OC)(C(=O)OC)O

Properties
Chemical formula	C_{23}H_{30}N_{2}O_{4}
Molar mass	398.503 g·mol^{−1}
- Except where otherwise noted, data are given for materials in their standard state (at 25 °C [77 °F], 100 kPa). Infobox references

Desacetoxyvindoline is a terpene indole alkaloid produced by the plant Catharanthus roseus. Desacetoxyvindoline is a product formed by the methylation of the nitrogen on the indole ring by the enzyme 3-hydroxy-16-methoxy-2,3-dihydrotabersonine N-methyltransferase (NMT). The metabolite is a substrate for desacetoxyvindoline 4-hydroxylase (D4H) which catalyzes a hydroxylation to yield deacetylvindoline.
