= Robert Noble (physician) =

Canadian physician (1910–1990)

Robert Laing Noble
- Born: February 3, 1910; Toronto, Ontario, Canada
- Died: December 11, 1990 (aged 80)
- Education: University of Toronto; University of London
- Known for: Discovery of vinblastine
- Awards: Officers of the Order of Canada

Robert Laing Noble OC FRSC (February 3, 1910 – December 11, 1990) was a Canadian physician who was involved in the discovery of vinblastine.

Born in Toronto, Ontario, he received his M.D. from the University of Toronto in 1934 and a Ph.D. in 1937 from the University of London.

In the 1950s he helped with the discovery of vincristine and vinblastine, widely used anti-cancer drugs.

In 1997, he was inducted into the Canadian Medical Hall of Fame. In 1988, he was made an Officer of the Order of Canada. In 1984, he was awarded the Gairdner Foundation International Award. He was a member of The Harvey Club of London, the oldest medical club in Canada.

The Robert L. Noble Prize is named in his honour.
