= 3-hydroxy-16-methoxy-2,3-dihydrotabersonine N-methyltransferase =

Class of enzymes

16-methoxy-2,3-dihydro-3-hydroxytabersonine N-methyltransferase

Identifiers
- EC no.: 2.1.1.99
- CAS no.: 113478-40-3

Databases
- IntEnz: IntEnz view
- BRENDA: BRENDA entry
- ExPASy: NiceZyme view
- KEGG: KEGG entry
- MetaCyc: metabolic pathway
- PRIAM: profile
- PDB structures: RCSB PDB PDBe PDBsum
- Gene Ontology: AmiGO / QuickGO
Search
- PMC: articles
- PubMed: articles
- NCBI: proteins

3-hydroxy-16-methoxy-2,3-dihydrotabersonine N-methyltransferase (EC 2.1.1.99) is an enzyme that catalyzes the chemical reaction

3-Hydroxy-16-methoxy-2,3-dihydrotabersonine
+ SAM
Desacetoxyvindoline
+ SAH

This is a methylation reaction in which the indole alkaloid, 3-hydroxy-16-methoxy-2,3-dihydrotabersonine, is converted to desacetoxyvindoline in Catharanthus roseus. The methyl group comes from the cofactor, S-adenosyl methionine (SAM), which becomes S-adenosyl-L-homocysteine (SAH).

This enzyme belongs to the family of transferases, specifically those transferring one-carbon group methyltransferases. The systematic name of this enzyme class is S-adenosyl-L-methionine:3-hydroxy-16-methoxy-2,3-dihydrotabersonine N-methyltransferase. Other names in common use include 16-methoxy-2,3-dihydro-3-hydroxytabersonine methyltransferase, NMT, 16-methoxy-2,3-dihydro-3-hydroxytabersonine N-methyltransferase, S-adenosyl-L-methionine:16-methoxy-2,3-dihydro-3-hydroxytabersonine, and N-methyltransferase. It participates in terpene indole and ipecac alkaloid biosynthesis.
