= Non-invasive micro-test technology =

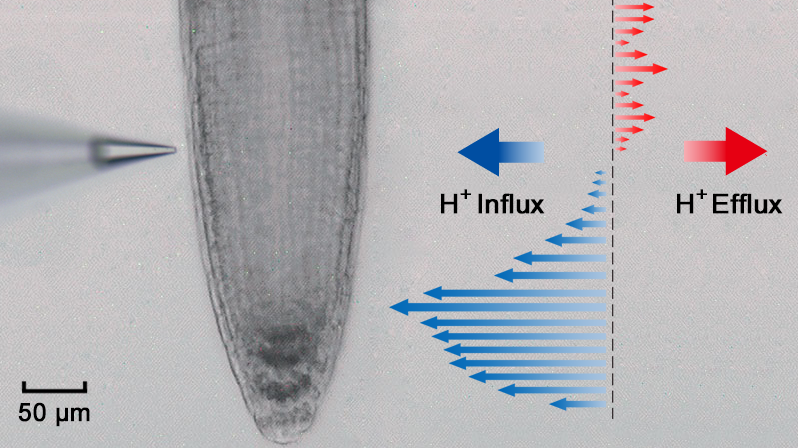
An NMT H^{+} flux profile of Arabidopsis root across several zones. This example shows strong H^{+} influx closer to the root tip, and slight H^{+} efflux further from the tip.

Non-invasive micro-test technology (NMT) is a scientific research technology used for measuring physiological events of intact biological samples. NMT is used for research in many biological areas such as gene function, plant physiology, biomedical research, and environmental science.

Most living things experience a constant exchange of ions and molecules with their surroundings as a result of biological processes. NMT uses specialized flux sensors, derived from microelectrodes, to measure this dynamic ion/molecule activity called flux around an intact sample. These fluxes reveal information about physiological phenomena.

Each NMT flux sensor is selective or specific for a particular ion/molecule of choice. Some of the more commonly published ion/molecule flux sensors are those that are commercially available, such as Ca^{2+}, H^{+}, K^{+}, Na^{+}, Cl^{−}, Mg^{2+}, Cd^{2+}, NH_{4}^{+}, NO_{3}^{−}, Pb^{2+}, Cu^{2+}, O_{2}, H_{2}O_{2}, and IAA (indole-3-acetic acid). Some other flux sensors include glutamate, glucose, Zn^{2+}, Hg^{2+}, and more that have been designed by individual laboratories.

NMT measures how much, how fast, and in what direction the chosen ions/molecules are moving. This is defined as diffusion flux, which is the amount of substance per unit area per unit time.

The principle of how NMT measures flux was described in the 1990s by a few different laboratories; Lionel Jaffe at the Marine Biological Laboratory described the Vibrating Probe technique, and Ian Newman at the University of Tasmania described the MIFE™ technique. There are also technologies SERIS and SIET that use this principle.

== Basic procedure ==
=== Live sample preparation ===
Different samples need different amounts of preparation work. For example, small organisms, condensed organelles, and cultured cells, tissues, or organs can be measured with little alteration, but anything below the skin or surface of large organisms must be exposed in order to measure. Generally, once the sample is prepared so that the desired measurement site is revealed, NMT causes no further damage or interference with the test; because of this, NMT is most commonly used for measuring live, intact samples. The live sample must be secured in a Petri dish so it does not move or shift. A single cell can be adhered by means such as a polylysine-coated slide; this also works for other small samples like condensed organelles. Large tissue samples like roots may be weighted down with filter paper and resin tiles. Plenty of other large samples can be measured as well, such as organs or whole small organisms like zebrafish.

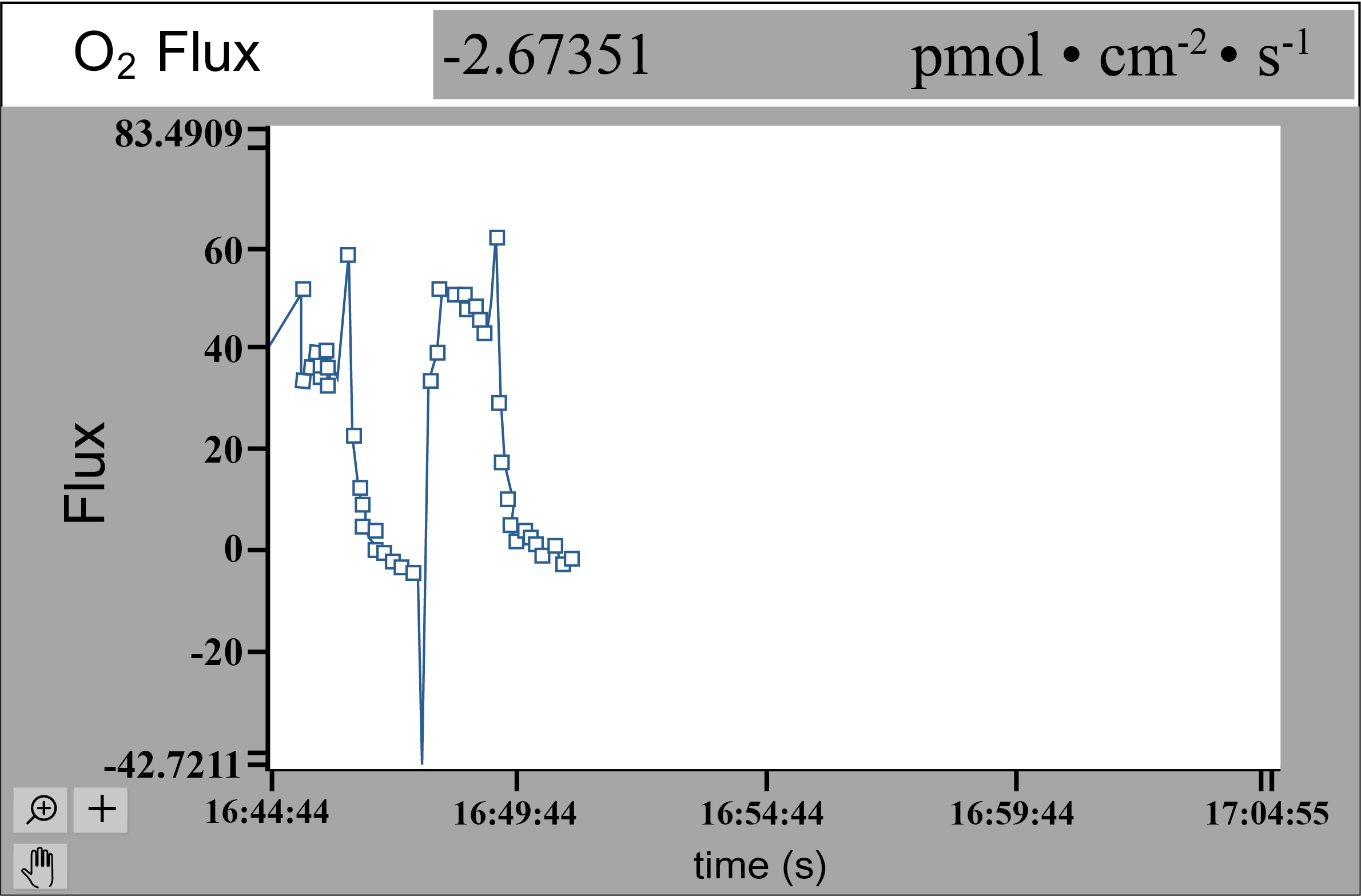
An example of raw flux data unfolding as NMT measures oxygen efflux from a leaf sample. During this test, a light is turned on and off periodically, each time causing a change in O_{2} flux due to photosynthesis.

=== Liquid media composition ===
The sample must be surrounded by liquid media, which will be different depending on the sample type, purpose of the test, and ions/molecules that will be measured. This media is a useful way to manipulate the sample's environment by adding things like drugs, stressors, or other biotic/abiotic stimuli.

This step can be the most challenging simply because it allows many possibilities for test manipulation. To get started in designing a specific new test, there is plenty of literature documenting successful composition of liquid media.

=== Recording ===
The prepared sample is placed under a microscope with a flux sensor which is controlled by a computer. The operator uses arrow keys to move the flux sensor to the desired point and distance from the sample, aided by a microscope camera.

The NMT flux sensor measures the flux and the data are plotted on-screen during the test. These fluxes are most often measured in the unit 10^{−12} moles • cm^{−2} • s^{−1}, or sometimes as small as 10^{−15} moles • cm^{−2} • s^{−1}, allowing flux to be measured from something as small as a single cell. During the test, further changes can be introduced like a stressor or other abiotic stimulus, and the flux patterns will change on-screen to show the physiological changes. For example, cold stress can be studied by adding ice-cold test buffer to the solution during testing.

== Variations ==
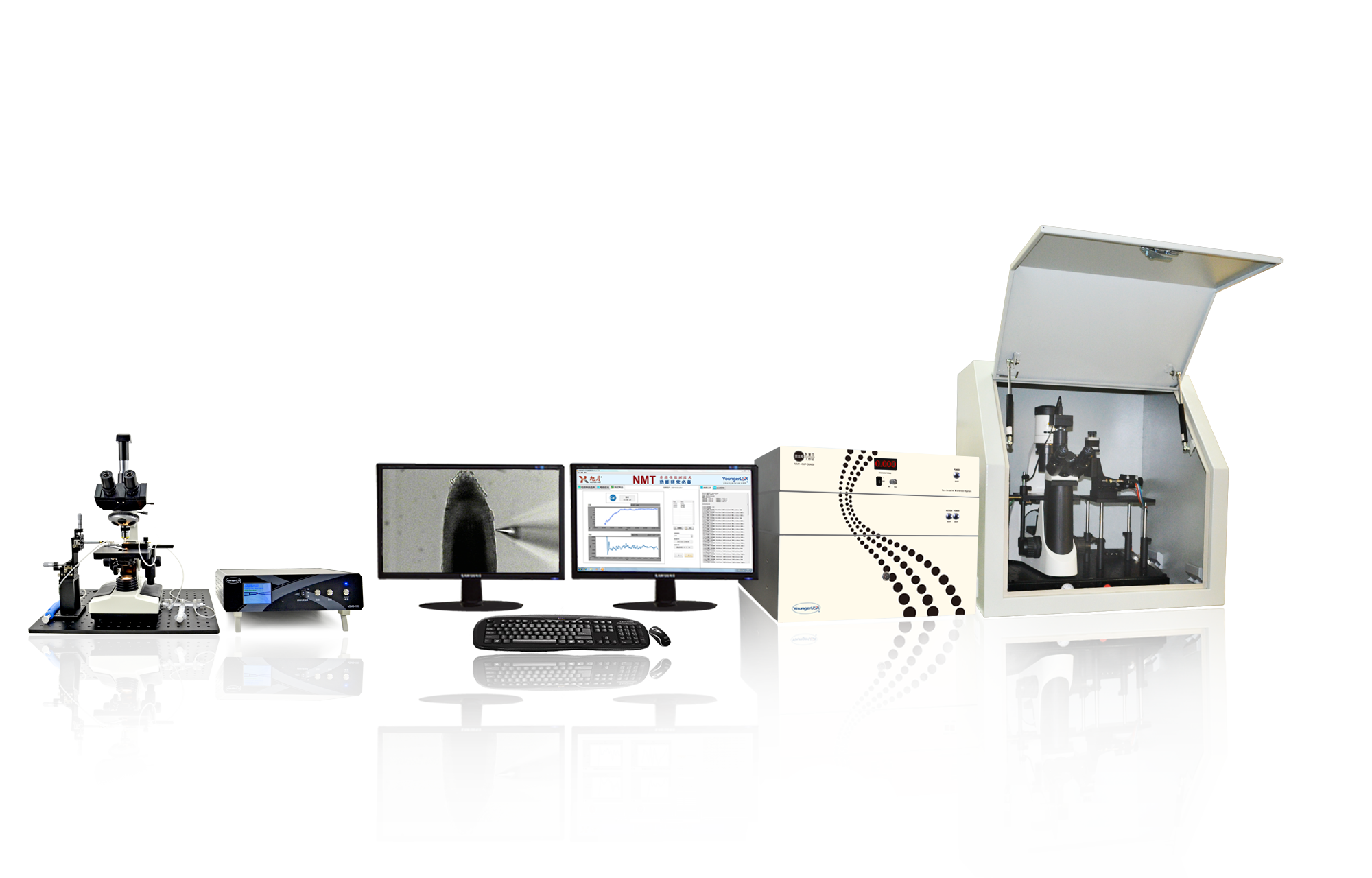
A picture of what an NMT system may look like. A Faraday cage holds the microscope and flux sensor manipulator to block interference, while a computer system controls and calculates from the outside.

=== 1-dimensional ===
This is the most common NMT test in which the flux sensor is moved in one direction in reference to the sample, generally perpendicular to the sample boundaries.

=== 2-dimensional ===
There is not much documented application of 2-dimensional measurement in NMT; the possibility was demonstrated with the Vibrating Probe technique by Degenhardt et al in 1998. They moved the flux sensor both perpendicular and then parallel to a plant root, then summed up the flux vectors to generate the 2-dimensional flux direction. In this kind of manner, NMT can measure 2D fluxes as well, using the same software that measures 3D fluxes.

=== 3-dimensional ===
One of the pioneers of 3D ion/molecule flux mapping is Joseph Kunkel. To generate a 3-dimensional view of fluxes, the flux sensor must take measurements in the X, Y, and Z directions at each point around a sample. In 2006, a view of H^{+} and O_{2} 3D flux vectors around a pollen tube was produced using Mageflux software developed by Yue Xu.

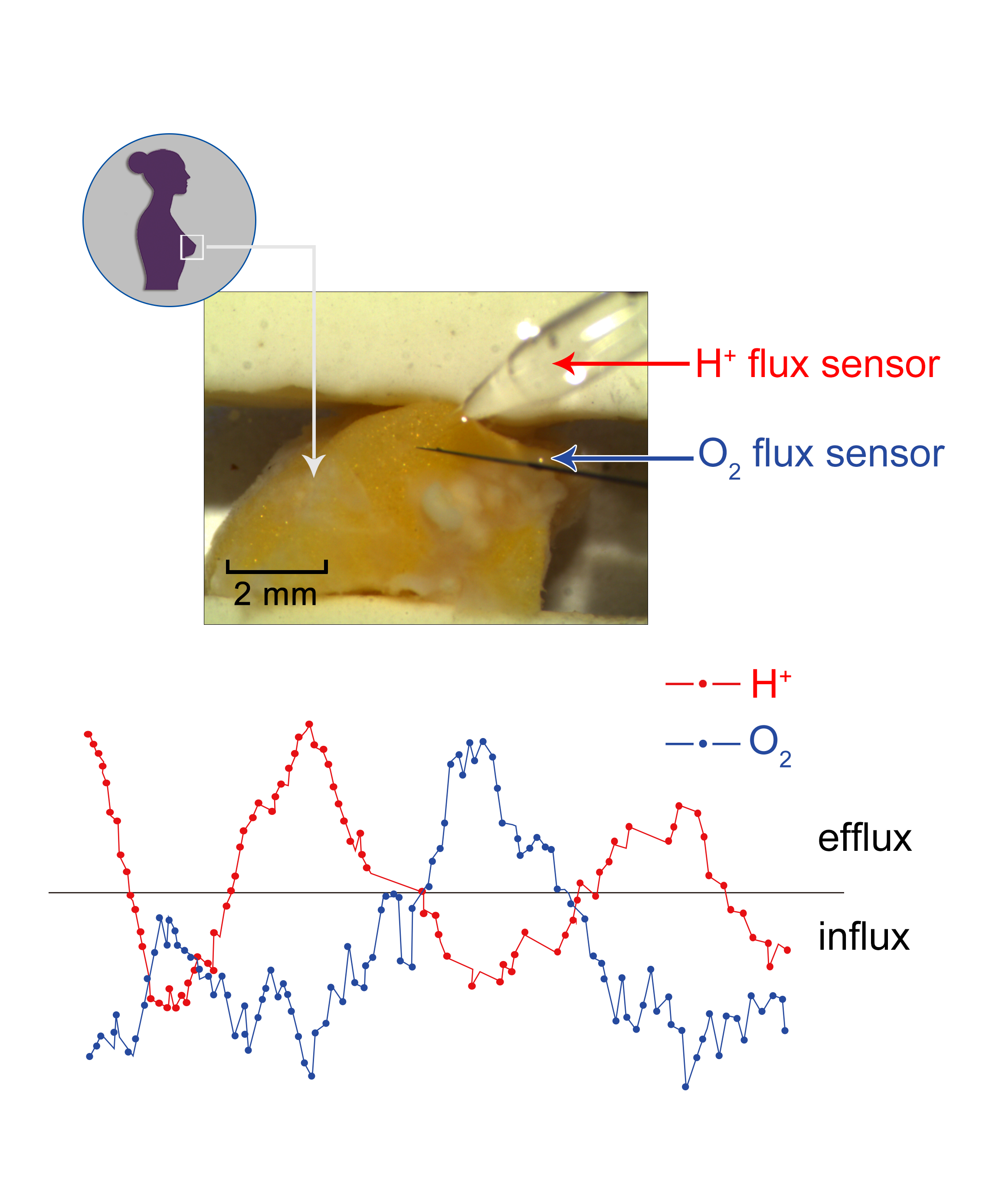
A breast tumor sample is measured simultaneously by H^{+} and O_{2} flux sensors. The data show how the fluxes change together, which is useful for research in areas like cancer metabolism.

=== Simultaneous ===
NMT flux sensors can be set up to measure two or more different ion/molecule fluxes at the same time, allowing the user to see the flux changes simultaneously, and to see the relationship between them. Combining two particular flux measurements simultaneously can be a strong indicator of physiological phenomena. For example, measuring both H^{+} and O_{2} simultaneously from a tumor sample (see figure to the right) can provide significant information about cancer metabolism that is far more useful than measuring only one at a time.

== Applications ==
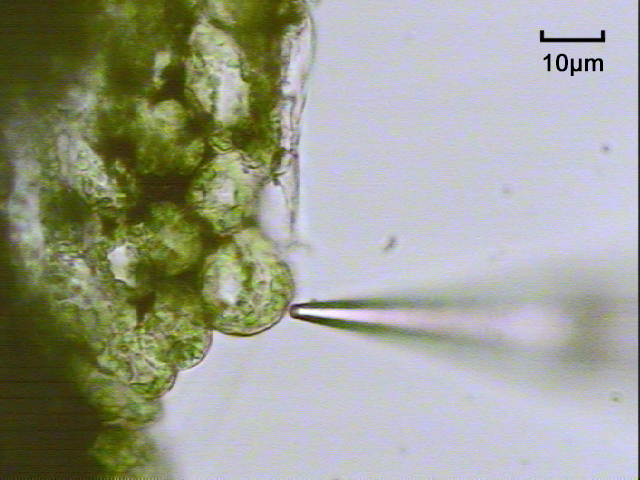
NMT flux sensor measuring a mesophyll cell

=== Genetics ===
It is widely accepted that both intracellular and extracellular ionic and molecular activities are vital to many physiological processes, also making them useful indicators of gene functions. By measuring dynamic ion/molecule fluxes, NMT has helped research on genes related to factors such as cold stress, salt tolerance, cadmium uptake, and nutrient uptake in plants. In biomedical genetic research, NMT has measured samples such as liver cells to investigate gene expression through fluxes.

=== Plant biology ===
NMT has been widely applied in plant biology in fields such as abiotic/biotic stress, plant nutrition, plant growth and development, plant/microbe interaction, plant defense, photosynthesis, signal transduction research, and more. Roots are commonly measured, in addition to many other plant samples such as leaf tissue, root hairs, guard cells, salt gland cells, mesophyll cells, and condensed organelles like chloroplasts and vacuoles. NMT can help identify plants that are more resistant to stressors like salt, temperature, drought, and disease. It is also a useful tool for studying plant nutrition absorption and regulation mechanisms in ways such as monitoring rates of nutrient uptake at the root surface.

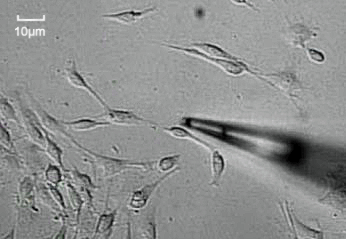
An individual neuron measured by NMT flux sensor

=== Biomedical ===
NMT is applied in biomedical research in various fields such as neuroscience, tumor research, drug screening, metabolism, and bone research. NMT is a useful tool for evaluating the effects of treatments for diseases like diabetes and cancer in tissue samples, as it can measure the flux changes in response to treatments. Measured samples include tumor tissue, neurons, brain tissue, liver cells, bone, muscle, and many more. Metabolism rates can be measured by NMT using O_{2} and H^{+} fluxes. In bone research, the flux of Ca^{2+} measured by NMT helps research on bone healing and growth.

=== Environmental ===
Various areas of environmental research in which NMT has been applied include water pollution detection, biological early warning, water quality assessment, and heavy metal detection. With global heavy metal pollution of crops on the rise, more NMT heavy metal flux sensors such as Cd^{2+}, Cu^{2+}, and Pb^{2+} have been used in research to identify plants that can tackle this problem with phytoremediation. For water quality and pollution research, water plants and algae have been measured, as well as biofilms and fish embryos.

== See also ==
- Fick's laws of diffusion
- Nernst equation
- Bioelectronics
- Patch clamp
- Diffusion
- Scanning vibrating electrode technique
- Microelectrode
