= Indecainide =

Chemical compound

Clinical data
- ATC code: none

Identifiers
- IUPAC name: 9-[3-(isopropylamino)propyl]-9H-fluorene-9-carboxamide
- CAS Number: 74517-78-5 73681-12-6 (HCl)
- PubChem CID: 52194
- DrugBank: DB00192
- ChemSpider: 47194
- UNII: 3AZF20DM1T
- KEGG: D04521
- ChEMBL: ChEMBL1201242
- CompTox Dashboard (EPA): DTXSID2057819

Chemical and physical data
- Formula: C_{20}H_{24}N_{2}O
- Molar mass: 308.425 g·mol^{−1}
- 3D model (JSmol): Interactive image
- SMILES: O=C(N)C3(c1ccccc1c2c3cccc2)CCCNC(C)C
- InChI: InChI=1S/C20H24N2O/c1-14(2)22-13-7-12-20(19(21)23)17-10-5-3-8-15(17)16-9-4-6-11-18(16)20/h3-6,8-11,14,22H,7,12-13H2,1-2H3,(H2,21,23); Key:UCEWGESNIULAGX-UHFFFAOYSA-N

Indecainide (INN, trade name Decabid) is a class Ic antiarrhythmic agent. Developed and marketed by Lilly, it has now been discontinued.
