= Preakuammicine =

Names
- IUPAC name Methyl (16α,19E)-16-(hydroxymethyl)-1,2-didehydrocur-19-en-17-oate
- Other names methyl (11S,12E,17S)-12-ethylidene-10-(hydroxymethyl)-8,14-diazapentacyclo[9.5.2.0^{1,9}.0^{2,7}.0^{14,1}7]octadeca-2,4,6,8-tetraene-10-carboxylate

Identifiers
| CAS Number | 23924-90-5 |
| 3D model (JSmol) | Interactive image |
| ChemSpider | 29763444 |
| PubChem CID | 71768191 |
- InChI: InChI=1S/C21H24N2O3/c1-3-13-11-23-9-8-20-14-6-4-5-7-16(14)22-18(20)21(12-24,19(25)26-2)15(13)10-17(20)23/h3-7,15,17,24H,8-12H2,1-2H3/b13-3-/t15-,17-,20+,21-/m0/s1 Key: DSOCELULQRKOMA-OQTQPSEISA-N; InChI=1/C21H24N2O3/c1-3-13-11-23-9-8-20-14-6-4-5-7-16(14)22-18(20)21(12-24,19(25)26-2)15(13)10-17(20)23/h3-7,15,17,24H,8-12H2,1-2H3/b13-3-/t15-,17-,20+,21-/m0/s1 Key: DSOCELULQRKOMA-OQTQPSEIBY
- SMILES: C/C=C\1/CN2CC[C@@]34[C@@H]2C[C@@H]1[C@](C3=Nc5c4cccc5)(CO)C(=O)OC

Properties
| Chemical formula | C_{21}H_{24}N_{2}O_{3} |
| Molar mass | 352.434 g·mol^{−1} |
- Except where otherwise noted, data are given for materials in their standard state (at 25 °C [77 °F], 100 kPa). Infobox references

Preakuammicine is a terpene indole alkaloid. Preakuammicine is thought to be formed from 4,21-dehydrogeissoschizine and lead to synthesis of stemmadenine. The enzymes involved in preakuammicine formation and those which use it as a substrate are currently unknown.
