= Affinine =

Names
- IUPAC name (2S,6R,14S,E)-5-ethylidene-14-(hydroxymethyl)-3,14-dimethyl-2,3,4,5,6,7-hexahydro-1H-2,6-methanoazecino[5,4-b]indol-8(9H)-one
- Other names 17-hydroxy-vobasan-3-one,

Identifiers
CAS Number	2134-82-9
3D model (JSmol)	Interactive image
ChemSpider	4444714
PubChem CID	5281345
CompTox Dashboard (EPA)	DTXSID70415107
- InChI: InChI=1S/C21H26N2O2/c1-4-13-11-23(3)19-9-15-14-7-5-6-8-17(14)22-20(15)18(25)10-16(13)21(19,2)12-24/h4-8,16,19,22,24H,9-12H2,1-3H3/b13-4-/t16-,19+,21+/m1/s1 Key: PROSDVOTXQJUDA-PGVNYQEXSA-N
- SMILES: C/C=C1CN(C)[C@H]2CC3=C(C(C[C@H]/1[C@]2(C)CO)=O)NC4=C3C=CC=C4

Properties
Chemical formula	C_{20}H_{24}N_{2}O_{2}
Molar mass	324.424 g·mol^{−1}
Melting point	265°C (decomp.)
- Except where otherwise noted, data are given for materials in their standard state (at 25 °C [77 °F], 100 kPa). Infobox references

Affinine is a monoterpenoid indole alkaloid which can be isolated from plants of the genus Tabernaemontana. Structurally it can be considered a member of the vobasine alkaloid family and may be synthesized from tryptophan. Limited pharmacological testing has indicated that it may be an effective inhibitor of both acetylcholinesterase and butyrylcholinesterase.

== See also ==
- Affinisine
