= Dehydrosecodine =

Names
- Preferred IUPAC name Methyl 2-{3-[2-(5-ethylpyridin-1(2H)-yl)ethyl]-1H-indol-2-yl}prop-2-enoate
- Other names Methyl 2-{3-[2-(5-ethyl-1(2H)-pyridinyl)ethyl]-1H-indol-2-yl}acrylate

Identifiers
| 3D model (JSmol) | Interactive image |
| ChEBI | CHEBI:146301 |
| ChemSpider | 29763446 |
| PubChem CID | 71768213 |
| CompTox Dashboard (EPA) | DTXSID201032252 |
- InChI: InChI=1S/C21H24N2O2/c1-4-16-8-7-12-23(14-16)13-11-18-17-9-5-6-10-19(17)22-20(18)15(2)21(24)25-3/h5-10,14,22H,2,4,11-13H2,1,3H3 Key: FGHJSNGBTCVANJ-UHFFFAOYSA-N; InChI=1/C21H24N2O2/c1-4-16-8-7-12-23(14-16)13-11-18-17-9-5-6-10-19(17)22-20(18)15(2)21(24)25-3/h5-10,14,22H,2,4,11-13H2,1,3H3 Key: FGHJSNGBTCVANJ-UHFFFAOYAS
- SMILES: CCC1=CN(CC=C1)CCc2c3ccccc3[nH]c2C(=C)C(=O)OC

Properties
| Chemical formula | C_{21}H_{24}N_{2}O_{2} |
| Molar mass | 336.435 g·mol^{−1} |
- Except where otherwise noted, data are given for materials in their standard state (at 25 °C [77 °F], 100 kPa). Infobox references

Dehydrosecodine is a terpene indole alkaloid. The compound is believed to be an unstable O-acetylated secodine type intermediate in the formation of catharanthine and tabersonine from stemmadenine. The enzyme tabersonine synthase converts it to tabersonine:

dehydrosecodine
Synthase
tabersonine
