= Lochnericine =

Chemical compound

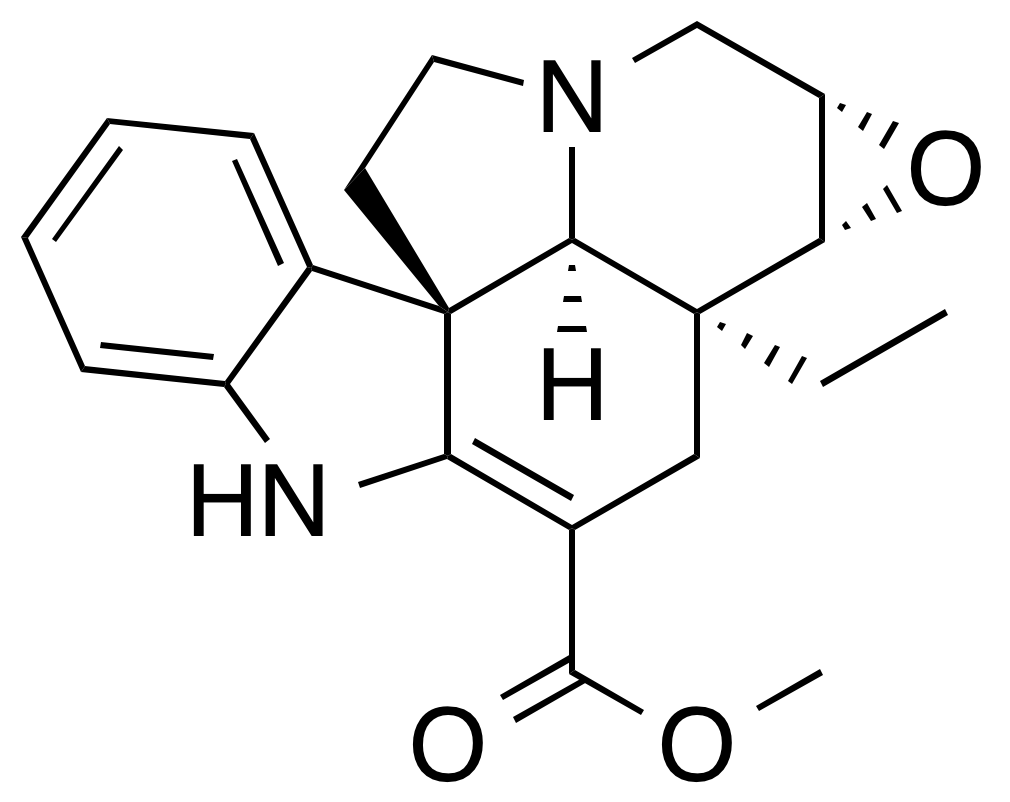

Identifiers
- IUPAC name: methyl (1R,12S,13R,15S,20R)-12-ethyl-14-oxa-8,17-diazahexacyclo[10.7.1.01,9.02,7.013,15.017,20]icosa-2,4,6,9-tetraene-10-carboxylate
- CAS Number: 72058-36-7
- PubChem CID: 11382599
- ChemSpider: 391593
- UNII: WY97J4B4AM
- KEGG: C11676
- ChEBI: CHEBI:6510
- ChEMBL: ChEMBLCHEMBL2011514

Chemical and physical data
- Formula: C_{21}H_{24}N_{2}O_{3}
- Molar mass: 352.434 g·mol^{−1}
- 3D model (JSmol): Interactive image
- SMILES: CC[C@]12CC(=C3[C@@]4([C@H]1N(CC4)C[C@H]5[C@@H]2O5)C6=CC=CC=C6N3)C(=O)OC
- InChI: InChI=1S/C21H24N2O3/c1-3-20-10-12(18(24)25-2)16-21(13-6-4-5-7-14(13)22-16)8-9-23(19(20)21)11-15-17(20)26-15/h4-7,15,17,19,22H,3,8-11H2,1-2H3/t15-,17-,19-,20+,21-/m0/s1; Key:AUVZFRDLRJQTQF-KXEYLTKFSA-N

Lochnericine is an indole alkaloid present in the roots of Catharanthus roseus. It is also present in Tabernaemontana divaricata.

== Chemistry ==
=== Synthesis ===
Lochnericine is formed from stereoselective epoxidation of carbons 6 and 7 of tabersonine.

== See also ==
- Pericine
- Pervine
- Tabersonine
- Vincamine
