= Tabersonine =

Names
- IUPAC name Methyl 2,3,6,7-tetradehydro-5α,12β,19α-aspidospermidine-3-carboxylate
- Systematic IUPAC name Methyl (3aR,3a^{1}S,10bR)-3a-ethyl-3a,3a^{1},4,6,11,12-hexahydro-1H-indolizino[8,1-cd]carbazole-5-carboxylate

Identifiers
CAS Number	4429-63-4; 29479-00-3 (hydrochloride)
3D model (JSmol)	Interactive image
ChemSpider	19292
ECHA InfoCard	100.022.378
KEGG	C09244
PubChem CID	20485
UNII	MN955K48NB
CompTox Dashboard (EPA)	DTXSID30196102
- InChI: InChI=1S/C21H24N2O2/c1-3-20-9-6-11-23-12-10-21(19(20)23)15-7-4-5-8-16(15)22-17(21)14(13-20)18(24)25-2/h4-9,19,22H,3,10-13H2,1-2H3/t19-,20-,21-/m0/s1 Key: FNGGIPWAZSFKCN-ACRUOGEOSA-N
- SMILES: CC[C@]12CC(=C3[C@@]4([C@H]1N(CC4)CC=C2)c5ccccc5N3)C(=O)OC

Properties
Chemical formula	C_{21}H_{24}N_{2}O_{2}
Molar mass	336.435 g·mol^{−1}
- Except where otherwise noted, data are given for materials in their standard state (at 25 °C [77 °F], 100 kPa). Infobox references

Tabersonine is a terpene indole alkaloid found in the medicinal plant Catharanthus roseus and also plants in the genus Voacanga (both taxa belonging to the alkaloid-rich family Apocynaceae). Tabersonine is hydroxylated at the 16 position by the enzyme tabersonine 16-hydroxylase to form 16-hydroxytabersonine. Tabersonine is the first intermediate leading to the formation of vindoline one of the two precursors required for vinblastine biosynthesis.

== Biosynthesis ==
Tabersonine is an indole alkaloid whose immediate precursor in Catharanthus roseus (Madagascar periwinkle) is the compound dehydrosecodine. This is cyclised by the enzyme tabersonine synthase:

dehydrosecodine
Synthase
tabersonine

The biosynthetic pathway to vindoline and vinblastine continues when tabersonine is hydroxylated by the enzyme tabersonine 16-hydroxylase, giving 16-hydroxytabersonine:

tabersonine
O_{2}
2 H_{2}O
16-hydroxytabersonine

== See also ==
- Conopharyngine
- Tabernanthine
