= Vindoline =

Names
- IUPAC name Methyl 3β,4β-dihydroxy-16-methoxy-1-methyl-6,7-didehydro-2β,5α,12β,19α-aspidospermidine-3α-carboxylate
- Systematic IUPAC name Methyl (3aR,3a^{1}R,4R,5S,5aR,10bR)-4-(acetyloxy)-3a-ethyl-5-hydroxy-8-methoxy-6-methyl-3a,3a^{1},4,5,5a,6,11,12-octahydro-1H-indolizino[8,1-cd]carbazole-5-carboxylate

Identifiers
CAS Number	2182-14-1
3D model (JSmol)	Interactive image
ChemSpider	228680
ECHA InfoCard	100.016.871
EC Number	218-558-0
PubChem CID	260535
UNII	571PJ1LW03
CompTox Dashboard (EPA)	DTXSID901045589
- InChI: InChI=1S/C25H32N2O6/c1-6-23-10-7-12-27-13-11-24(19(23)27)17-9-8-16(31-4)14-18(17)26(3)20(24)25(30,22(29)32-5)21(23)33-15(2)28/h7-10,14,19-21,30H,6,11-13H2,1-5H3/t19-,20+,21+,23+,24+,25-/m0/s1 Key: CXBGOBGJHGGWIE-ACSXSLCXSA-N; InChI=1/C25H32N2O6/c1-6-23-10-7-12-27-13-11-24(19(23)27)17-9-8-16(31-4)14-18(17)26(3)20(24)25(30,22(29)32-5)21(23)33-15(2)28/h7-10,14,19-21,30H,6,11-13H2,1-5H3/t19-,20+,21+,23+,24+,25-/m0/s1 Key: CXBGOBGJHGGWIE-ACSXSLCXBW
- SMILES: CC[C@@]12C=CCN3[C@@H]1[C@@]4(CC3)c5ccc(cc5N([C@H]4C([C@@H]2OC(=O)C)(C(=O)OC)O)C)OC

Properties
Chemical formula	C_{25}H_{32}N_{2}O_{6}
Molar mass	456.539 g·mol^{−1}
- Except where otherwise noted, data are given for materials in their standard state (at 25 °C [77 °F], 100 kPa). Infobox references

Vindoline is a chemical precursor to vinblastine. Vindoline is formed through biosynthesis from Tabersonine.

== See also ==
- Lochnericine
- Dimerization of catharanthine and vindoline
