= CPS =

CPS or cps may refer to:

== Organizations ==
=== Canada ===
- Calgary Police Service, Alberta
- Canadian Paediatric Society
- Canadian Power and Sail Squadrons, recreational sailors
- Compendium of Pharmaceuticals and Specialties

=== China ===
- Chinese Poetry Society, a national literary society

=== United Kingdom ===
- Cambridge Philosophical Society, a scientific society at the University of Cambridge
- Cambridge Positioning Systems, a GPS software company bought by CSR plc
- Centre for Policy Studies, a British think-tank
- Communist Party of Scotland
- Crown Prosecution Service, in England and Wales

=== United States ===
- Child protective services, U.S. agencies responsible for child protection
- Chicago Public Schools, a public school system in Chicago, Illinois
- Cincinnati Public Schools, Hamilton County, Ohio
- Civilian Public Service, a WWII alternative for conscientious objectors
- Cleveland Photographic Society, Ohio
- Coalition for Positive Sexuality, an educational website
- The College Preparatory School, Oakland, California
- CPS Energy, formerly City Public Service Board of San Antonio, Texas

=== Elsewhere ===
- CPS (programadora) (Comunicaciones Producción y Servicios de Televisión), a Colombian TV program-maker (1998–2003)
- Colegio de la Preciosa Sangre de Pichilemu, a school in Chile
- College of Physicians and Surgeons (disambiguation)
- Conference of Presentation Sisters of North America, a congregation of the Presentation Sisters religious order
- Convention Panafricaine Sankariste, Burkina Faso

== Science and technology ==
=== Biology and chemistry ===
- Capsaicin, a pungent component of chili peppers
- Carbamoyl phosphate synthase II, an enzyme that catalyzes a reaction yielding carbamoyl phosphate
- Carbamoyl phosphate synthetase, an enzyme that catalyzes a reaction yielding carbamoyl phosphate
- Chlorpyrifos, an organophosphate pesticide
- Concentrate of poppy straw, processed poppy straw
- Circumsporozoite protein, a protein secreted by the malaria parasite during the sporozoite stage

=== Computing ===
- CPS, a Corel Photo House image file format
- Certification Practice Statement, of a certificate authority
- Common Package Specification, a JSON-based description format to include libraries, especially for C and C++
- Continuation-passing style, a programming technique
- Conversational Programming System, an IBM time-sharing operating system
- CP System, an arcade system board

=== Engineering ===
- Cyber-physical system, or intelligent system, controlling a mechanism

=== Medicine ===
- Cancer Prevention Study, a series of cohort studies by the American Cancer Society
- Comorbidity–polypharmacy score

=== Physics ===
- Centipoise, a viscosity subunit, cP, but cps or cPs also used
- CERN Proton Synchrotron, a particle accelerator
- Counts per second (cps), detected by a radiation monitoring instrument
- Cycle per second (c.p.s.), now Hertz

=== Telecommunications ===
- Calls per second

== Transport ==
- St. Louis Downtown Airport, United States (IATA code: CPS)
- Caroline Springs railway station, Australia (VicTrack code: CPS)
- Clapham South tube station, England (London Underground code: CPS)

== Other uses ==
- Central Police Station (disambiguation)
- Clerk Police Sergeant, a former London Metropolitan Police rank of station sergeant
- Complex problem-solving, a type of problem solving
- Combination Product Set in hexany
- Constant Pressure System, a design used in water guns
- Cost-per-sale, an online advertising pricing system
- Current Population Survey, an American statistical survey
- Conventional Prompt Strike, a proposed class of U.S. military weapon systems
- Capiznon language (ISO 639-3 code: cps)
