= 2010 in science =

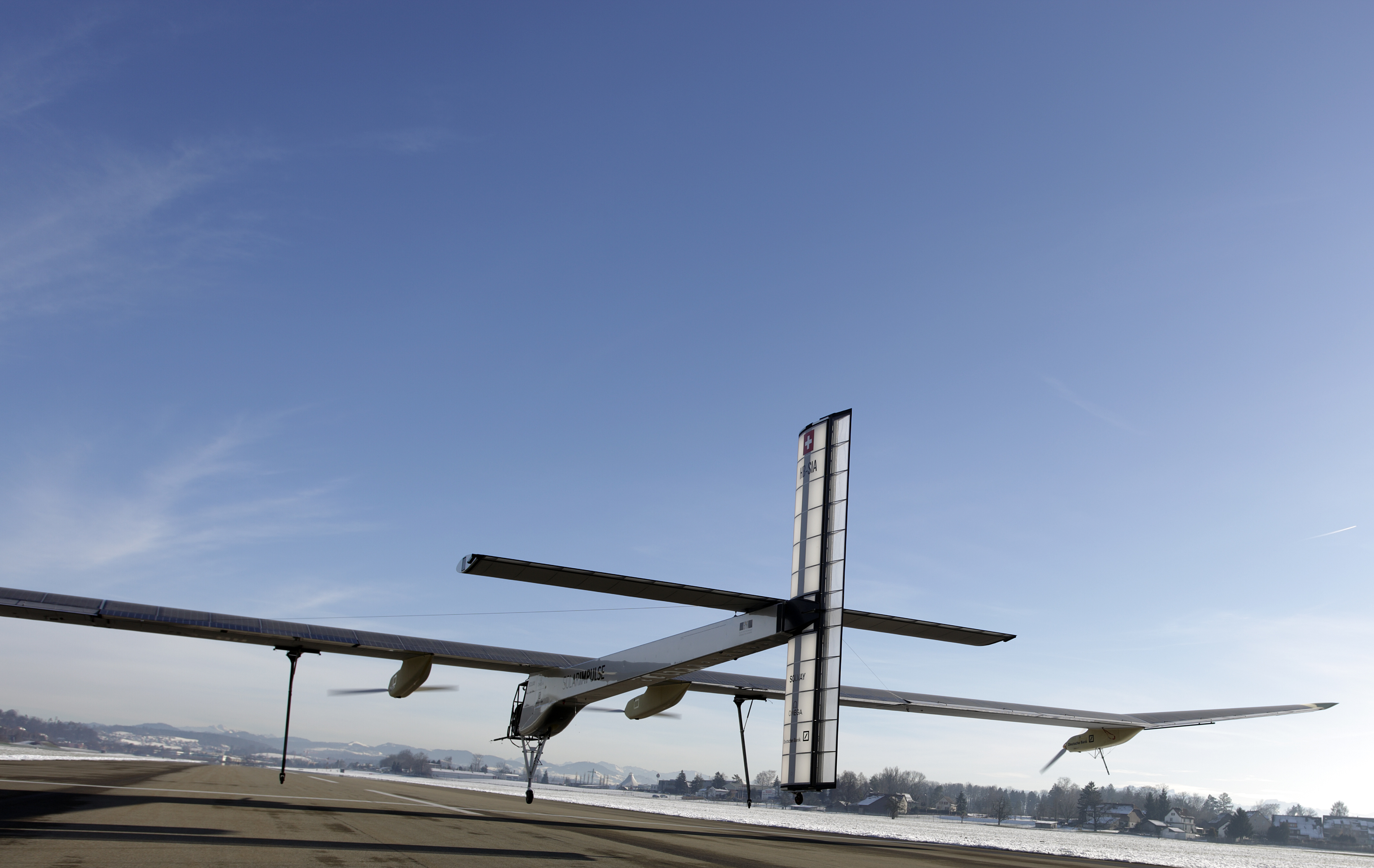
8 July 2010: the Solar Impulse (picturedhola ) becomes the first aircraft to complete a non-stop 24-hour flight using only solar power.

The year 2010 involved numerous significant scientific events and discoveries, some of which are listed below. The United Nations declared 2010 the International Year of Biodiversity.

== Events, discoveries and inventions ==
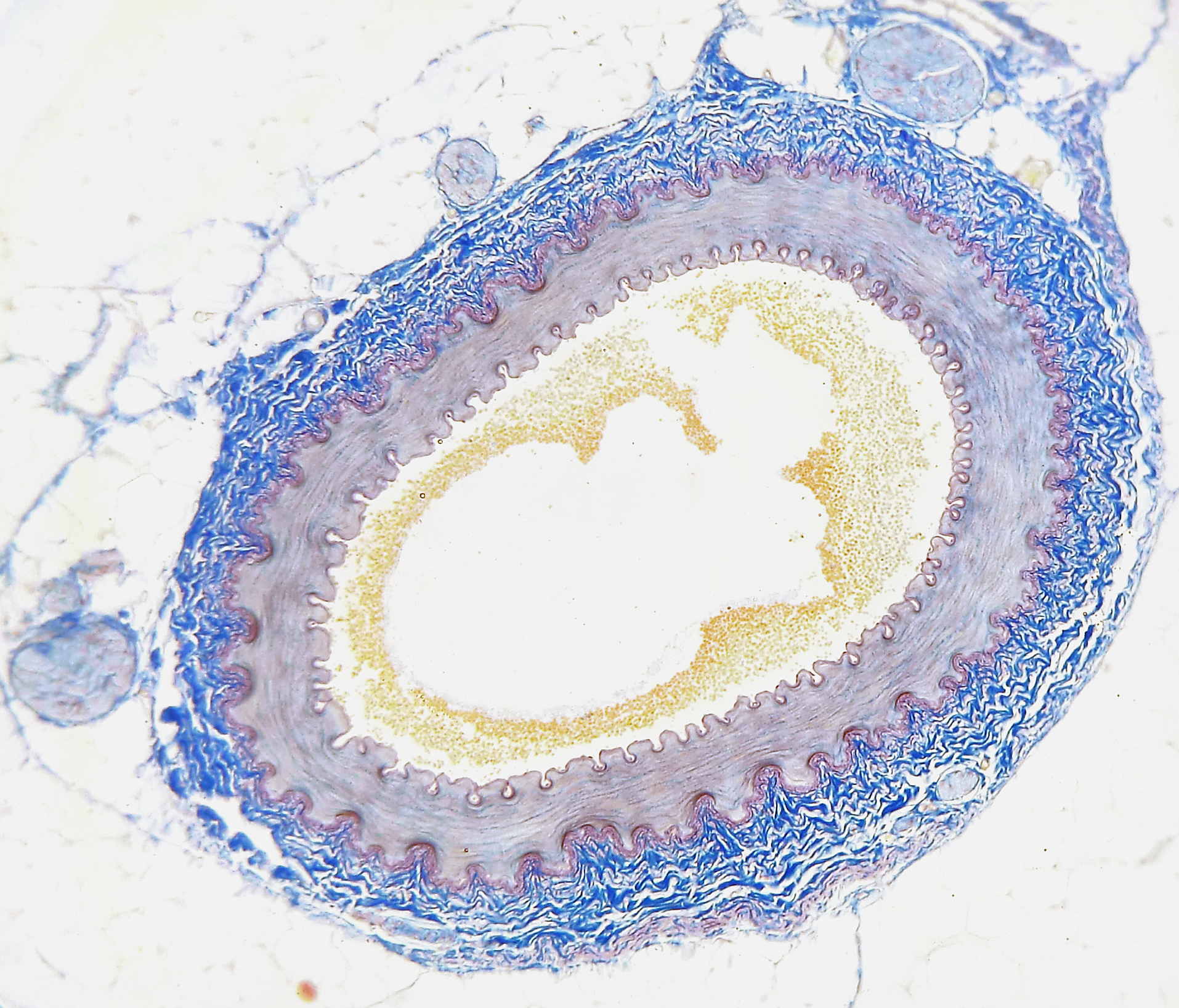
3 January 2010: British scientists create working artificial arteries (artery cross-section pictured).

=== January ===
- 3 January – British scientists report that they have made artificial arteries out of flexible polymer. (Royal Free Hampstead)
- 7–10 January – The Consumer Electronic Show takes place in Las Vegas, with 3DTV technology being highly promoted during the event. (CNN)
- 21 January – Iranian researchers develop a silica-based nano-absorbent to filter harmful heavy metals from waste water.
- 28 January – A joint American-Australian team construct a quantum computer that can correctly simulate a hydrogen molecule. (Wired) (Nat. Chem.)

=== February ===
- 1 February – The President of the United States, Barack Obama, announces that he will cancel NASA's plans to return to the Moon by 2020, due to budget constraints. (BBC)
- 3 February
  - Scientists announce that they are on the verge of creating pills that target specific genes in the human genome to increase longevity. They reveal that the pills may be ready for human testing within three years. (Sky News)
  - Scientists develop a way of communicating with a brain-damaged man by accessing his thoughts. (BBC)
  - Scientists studying fossils in an open coal mine in Colombia determine that the giant prehistoric snake Titanoboa, which measured up to 45 feet (14 m) in lengths, hunted and ate crocodiles. (MSNBC) (Journal of Vertebrate Paleontology)
- 4 February – Scientists use direct fossil evidence to make a reasonable interpretation of a dinosaur's color.(BBC) (Wired) (Science)
- 5 February
  - Cambridge University researchers develop an artificial pancreas to help regulate blood sugar levels in children with Type 1 diabetes. (MSNBC) (The Lancet)
  - The Hubble Space Telescope provides new images of the dwarf planet Pluto, revealing that it has an ever-changing surface. (NASA) (BBC)
  - Scientists demonstrate a method to alter the properties of a lone electron without disturbing nearby electrons, a feat important in the development of quantum computers. (ScienceDaily) (Science)
- 8 February – Researchers at the University of Leicester and King's College London discover gene variations that control how fast people age, and could help spot and cure potential age-related illnesses in people. (BBC) (Nat. Genet.)
- 9–13 February – The TED innovation conference is held in Palm Springs, California. (Wired)

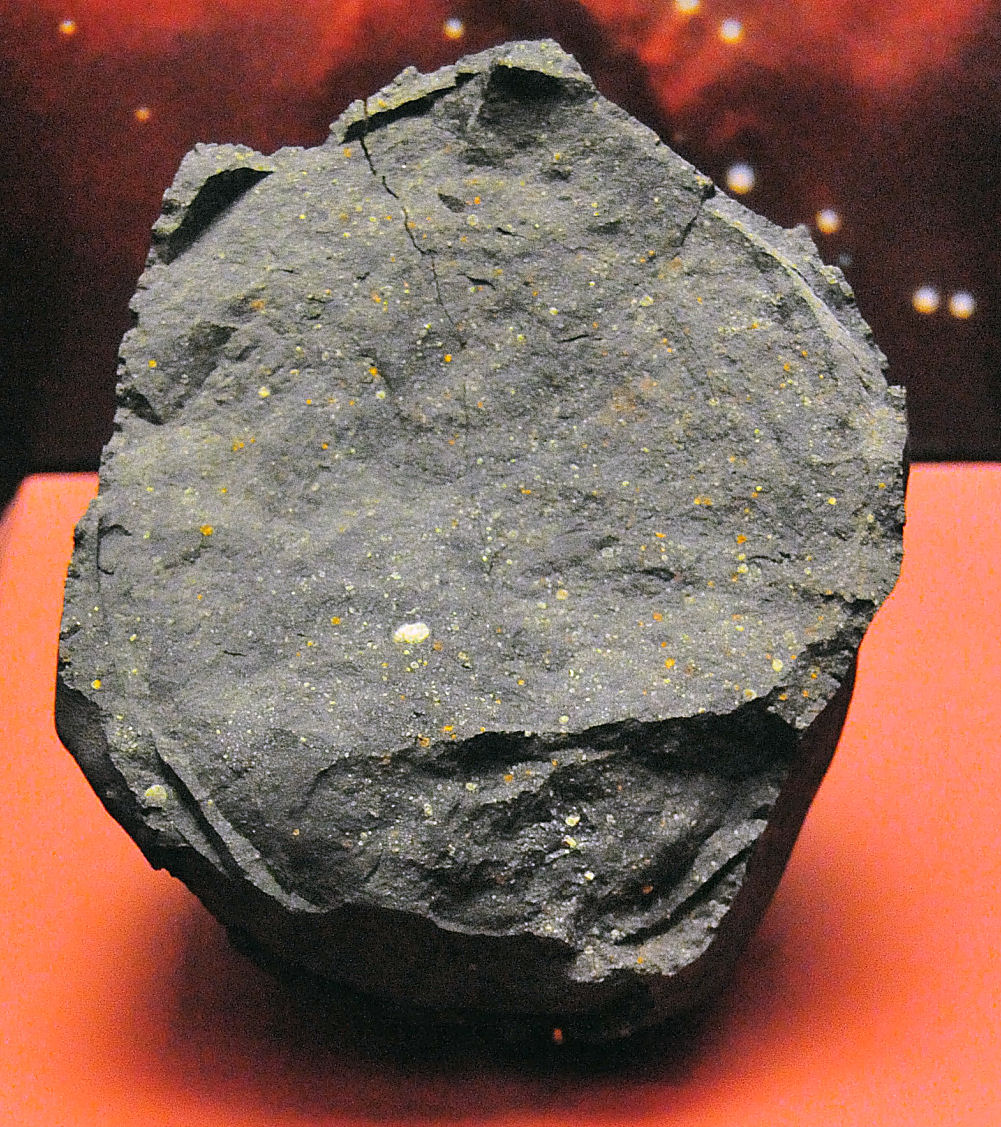
15 February 2010: scientists state that the 1969 Murchison meteorite (fragment pictured) contained a large number of organic compounds.

- 10 February
  - Scientists discover several genes linked to human stuttering, hoping that the findings may lead to a possible enzyme treatment for the condition. (MSNBC) (NEJM)
  - Scientists decipher the genetic code of the hair of a 4,000-year-old man who was mummified in the permafrost of Greenland. They discover that his genetic pattern resembles those of modern-day Asians and Native Americans. (MSNBC) (BBC) (Nature)
  - The European-owned Paranal Observatory in Chile provides new images of the Orion Nebula, photographing beyond the numerous gas clouds by taking advantage of the facility's new Visible and Infrared Survey Telescope for Astronomy (VISTA) technology. (MSNBC)
- 12 February – The results of a genetic study on the tiger reveal that it began evolving 3.2 million years ago, and that its closest living relative is the snow leopard. (BBC) (Mol. Phylogenet. Evol.)
- 15 February – Scientists confirm that the Murchison meteorite that crashed onto Earth's surface in 1969 contains millions of organic compounds. (BBC) (PNAS)
- 16 February
  - A study published in Biological Psychiatry announces that insomnia and chronic lack of sleep are linked to lower grey matter density in the human brain. (MSNBC) (Biol. Psych.)
  - A medical study of 4,000 American nurses reveal that aspirin lowers the risk of breast cancer returning or spreading by 50%. (MSNBC) (J. Clin. Oncol.)
- 17 February – Scientists at the University College Dublin's Animal Genomics Laboratory and Conway Institute analyse the DNA of a species of European cattle that died out 400 years ago by extracting material from a bone found in an English cavern. (BBC) (PLoS ONE)
- 18 February – Scientists discover that the fear of spiders and snakes may develop before birth through the experiences of the pregnant mother. (MSNBC) (American Naturalist)
- 21 February – Researchers report that teaching stroke victims to sing can help them regain their speech. (BBC) (Music Perception)
- 27 February – Physicists discover that a similar technique used primarily for tattoo removal can be applied to the cleaning and rejuvenating of centuries-old artwork. (BBC) (Acc. Chem. Res.)

=== March ===
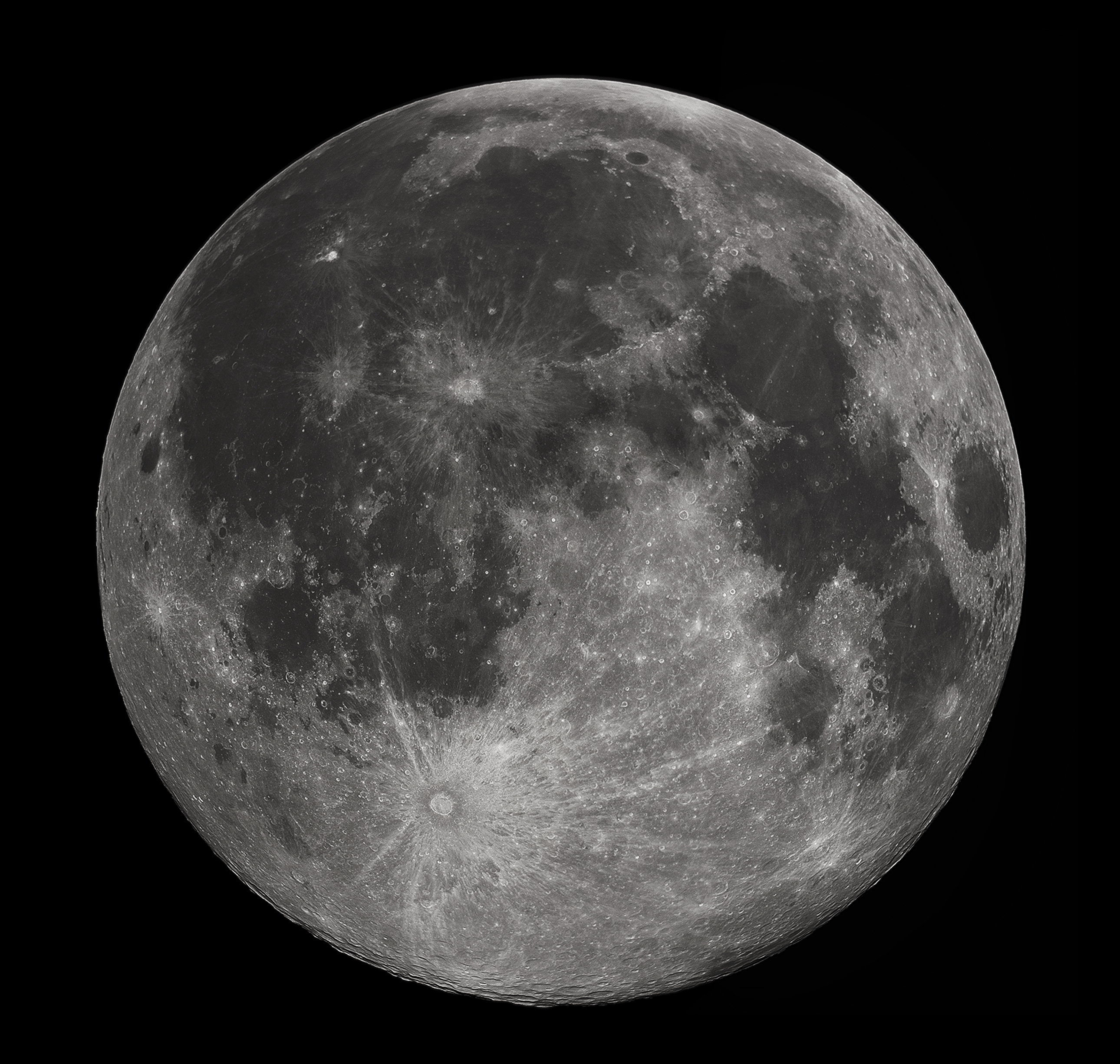
1 March 2010: NASA confirms the presence of large quantities of water ice on the north pole of the Moon.

- 1 March – NASA announces that the Moon's northern pole contains millions of tons of water ice. (MSNBC)
- 10 March – Botanists discover that Borneo's giant pitcher plants, which were previously thought to be large enough to devour small rodents, instead have a diet composed of rodent droppings. (BBC) (New Phytol.)
- 11 March – Scientists discover the reasons behind malformed limbs in embryos exposed to thalidomide. (BBC) (Science)
- 13 March – While researching nanotechnology applications, scientists at M.I.T. find a new energy source involving carbon nanotubes. (CNN) (Nat. Mater.)
- 17 March – Scientists create a quantum state in an object large enough to be visible to the naked eye, billions of times larger than any previous quantum state. (BBC) (Nature)
- 24 March – A genetic analysis of a pinky finger bone found in Siberia indicates it to be that of a distant and previously unknown relative of Homo sapiens. (TIME) (Nature)

=== April ===
- 5 April – Space Shuttle Discovery uses the MPLM Raffaello to deliver science racks to the International Space Station (ISS) on the STS-131 mission. (NASA)
- 7 April
  - A team of Russian and American scientists announce the creation of the newest superheavy element, tennessine (element 117). (Science Daily) (Phys. Rev. Lett.)
  - The first known animals to live their lives entirely without oxygen – members of the phylum Loricifera – are discovered in the L'Atalante basin deep under the Mediterranean. (Science Daily) (BMC Biology)
- 8 April – Newly published results reveal that two partial skeletons unearthed in 2008 in a cave in South Africa belong to a previously unclassified species of hominid, Australopithecus sediba, an upright walker that shared many physical traits with the earliest known Homo species. (Science Daily) (Science)
- 13 April – Europe's LOFAR radio astronomy array releases its first images. (Science Daily)
- 14 April – Researchers produce human embryos containing DNA from three people. (Wired) (Nature)

=== May ===
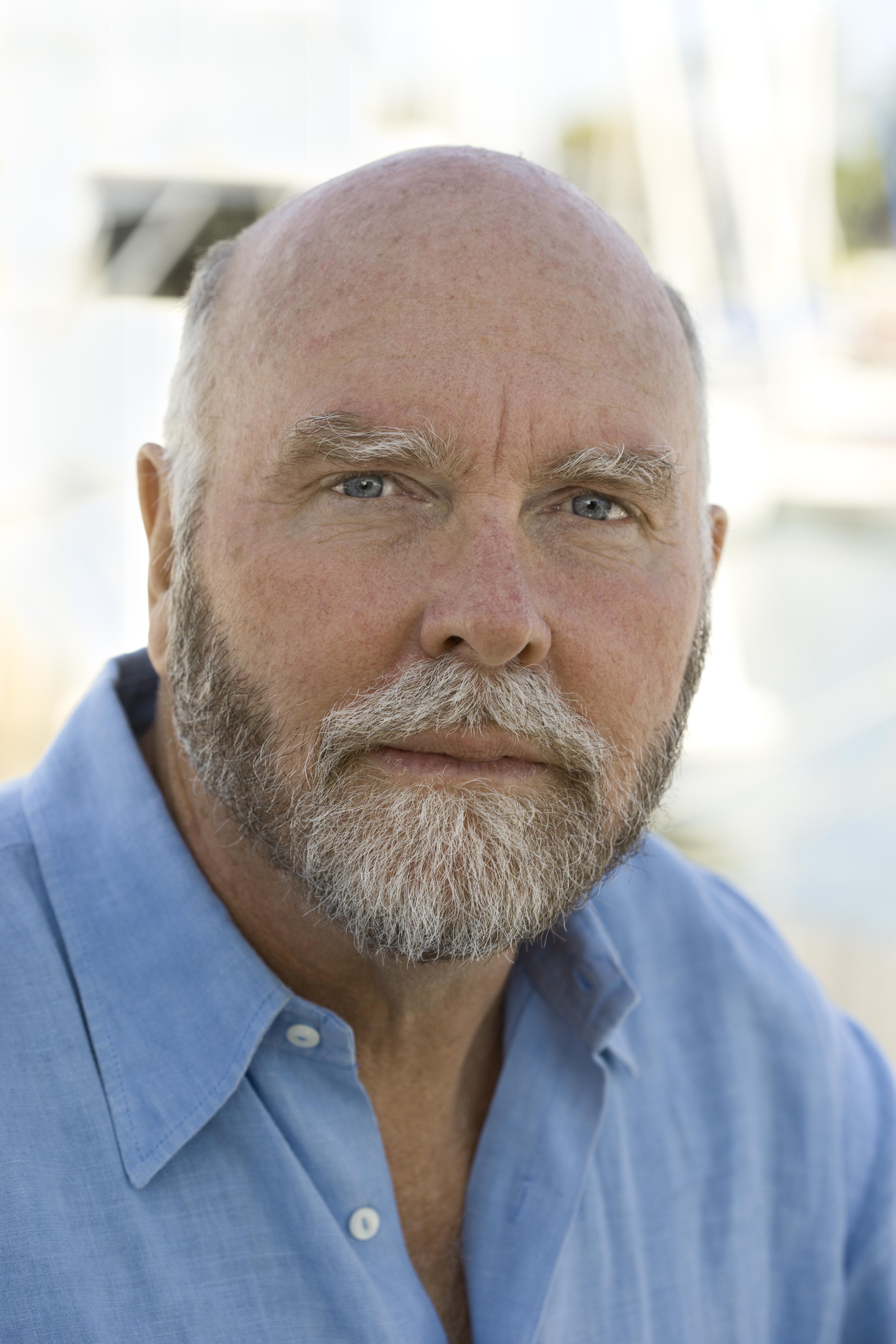
20 May 2010: scientists led by Craig Venter (pictured) create a living cell with an entirely artificial genome.

- 7 May – Scientists conducting the Neanderthal genome project at the Max Planck Institute for Evolutionary Anthropology describe a draft sequence of the Neanderthal (Homo neanderthalensis) genome in the journal Science. The study discovers strong evidence of substantial interbreeding between Neanderthals and Homo sapiens (modern humans). (The Guardian), (Time)
- 13 May – Scientists create robotic nano-spiders – microscopic DNA constructs able to follow programmed instructions. (TechEYE) (Nature)
- 17 May – Scientists in the United States and Canada link pesticides use on food crops to the rise of ADHD and other attention deficit disorder cases in children. (MSNBC) (Pediatrics)
- 20 May
  - One of Jupiter's stripes is found to be missing, with scientists reportedly unsure as to why. (CNN) (Science@NASA)
  - American researchers led by Craig Venter announce the creation of a synthetic living cell, with an entirely artificial genome. (BBC)
- 26 May – The Alaotra grebe is declared extinct, marking the first confirmed bird extinction since 2008. (BBC) (BirdLife International)

=== June ===
- 1 June – A record high temperature of 53.7C (129F) is confirmed by government meteorologists in Pakistan. (The Guardian)
- 3 June – An unknown object impacts Jupiter. (Astronomy Magazine) (Astrophys. J.)
- 13 June – Data indicates that up to one-third of Mars' surface was once covered by an ocean. (Christian Science Monitor) (Nat. Geosci.)
- 16 June – Iranian chemists developed a safe way to create nuclear energy with laser.
- 21 June – Scientists studying the behavior of chimpanzees note that they will kill each other in rival turf wars. (MSNBC) (Curr. Biol.)

=== July ===
- 8 July – The Swiss Solar Impulse aircraft performs the first ever 24-hour non-stop flight powered purely by solar energy. (Engadget)
- 14 July – Scientists in the United Kingdom announce that they have discovered a protein in hens that is necessary for the production of eggs. (MSNBC) (CBS) (Angew. Chem. Int. Ed. Engl.)
- 16 July
  - Scientists in the United States succeed in genetically engineering a malaria-resistant mosquito. (BBC) (PLoS Pathog.)
  - First (test) Instagram posts made by co-developers Mike Krieger and Kevin Systrom in San Francisco; the service launches publicly on October 6.
- 19 July – A vaginal gel which reduces the risk of HIV infection in women is developed. (New York Times) (Science)
- 30 July – NASA's Mars Reconnaissance Orbiter reveals potential sites for the search for fossilized remains on the surface of Mars. (MSNBC) (Christian Science Monitor) (Earth Planet. Sci. Lett.)

=== August ===
- August 12 – 318-million-year-old fossils of reptile footprints found in New Brunswick provide evidence that reptiles were the first creatures to live exclusively on land. (Telegraph) (CBC News) (Palaeo)

=== September ===
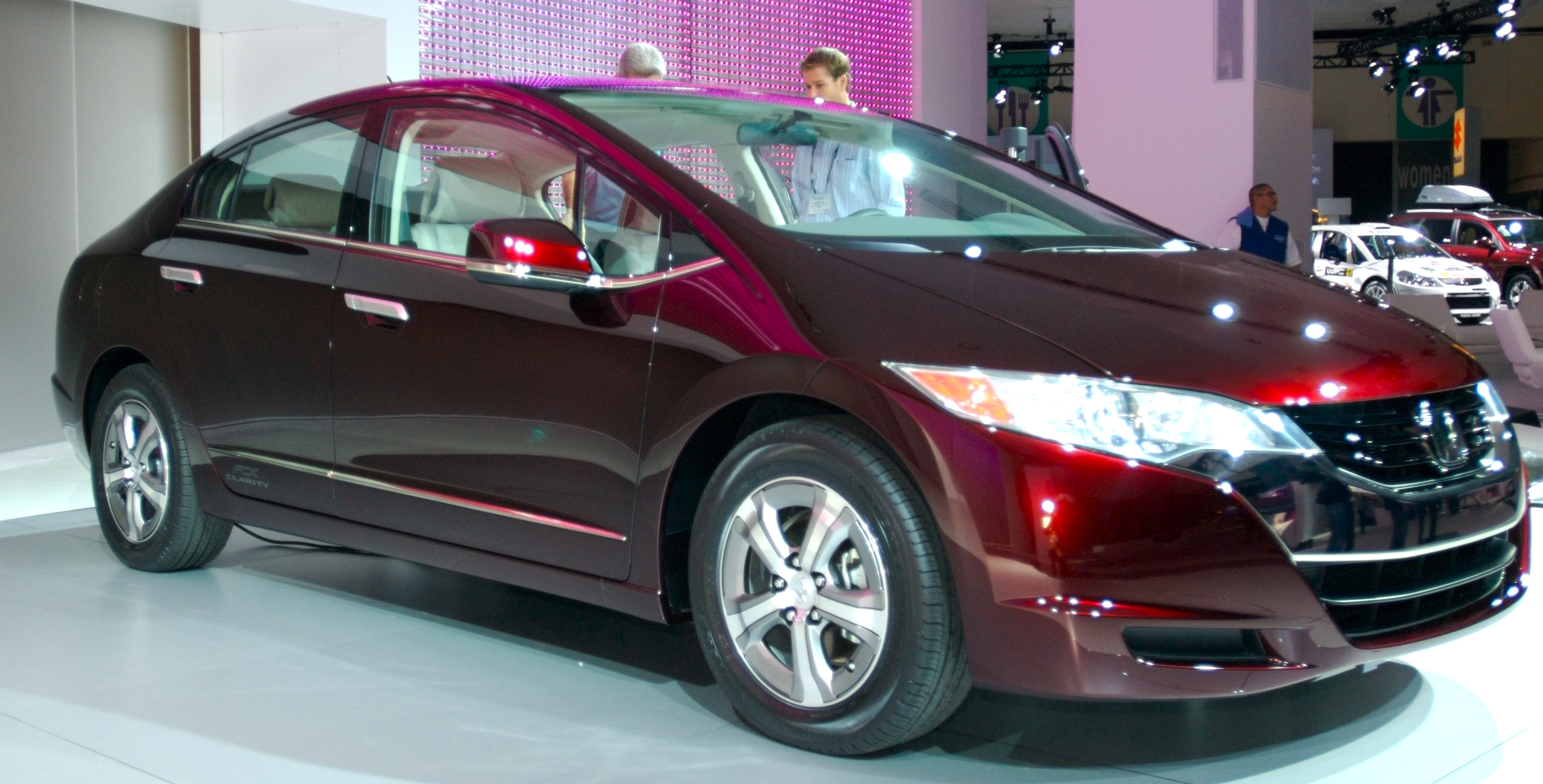
14 September 2010: Honda's FCX Clarity (pictured), the world's first production-line hydrogen car, arrives in the United Kingdom.

- 14 September – A car powered by hydrogen fuel cells, reportedly the world's first production-line hydrogen car, arrives in the UK. (BBC)
- 29 September – Astronomers report the discovery of Gliese 581 g, the first exoplanet lying within its star's habitable zone. (Wired) (arXiv)

=== October ===
- 11 October – American doctors begin the first official human trial of a treatment using embryonic stem cells. (BBC)
- 13 October – High Resolution Fly's Eye Observatory confirms the Greisen–Zatsepin–Kuzmin limit, the theoretical limit for ultra-high-energy cosmic rays interacting with the Cosmic Microwave Background.
- 14 October – Rinderpest is announced as having been eradicated worldwide. (BBC)
- 20 October – Scientists announce the discovery of the galaxy UDFy-38135539, the most distant object yet discovered in the universe. (New Scientist) arXiv (Nature)
- 26 October – Sony retires the cassette Walkman, which was first sold in 1979. (CNN)

=== November ===
- 3 November – The comet Ikeya-Murakami is discovered. (NASA)
- 8 November – Researchers at McMaster University report that they have converted skin cells into blood cells. (CNN) (Nature)
- 16 November – Siddhartha Mukherjee's The Emperor of All Maladies: a biography of cancer is published.
- 17 November – Neutral antimatter atoms are successfully trapped for the first time, with 38 antihydrogen atoms held in place for a fraction of a second. (BBC) (Nature)

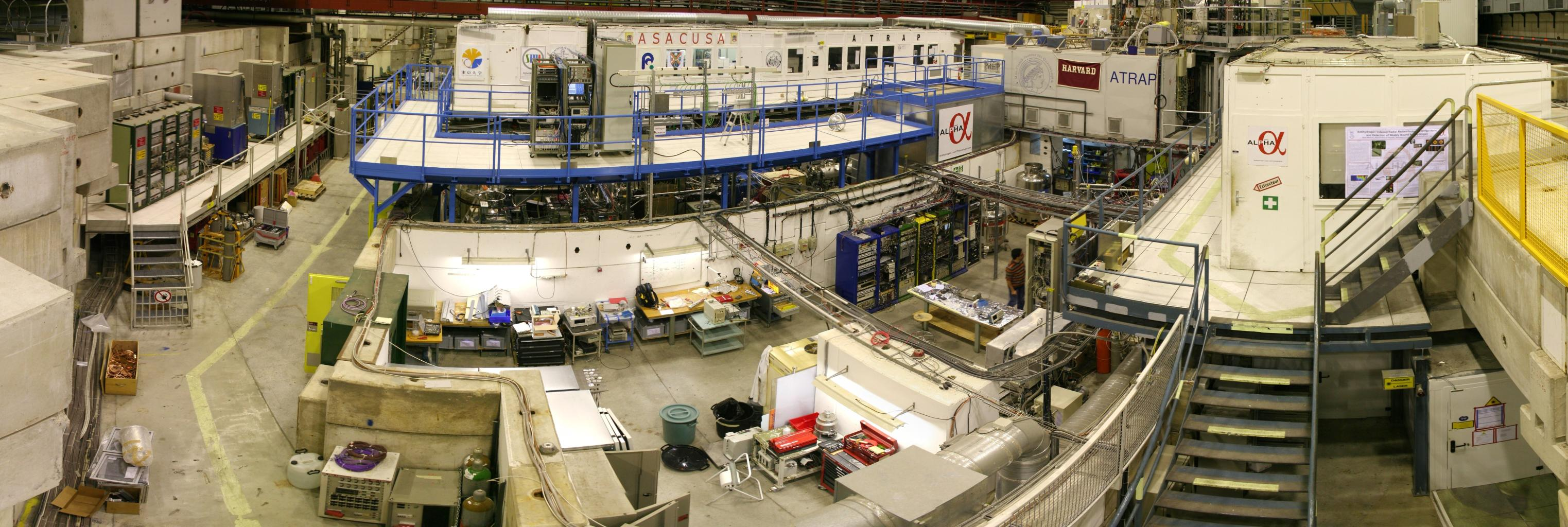
17 November 2010: scientists at CERN (pictured) trap neutral antimatter atoms for the first time.

- 28 November – Scientists reportedly reverse the ageing process in mice. (The Guardian) (Nature)

=== December ===
- 2 December – NASA-supported researchers discover the first microorganism known to be able to thrive and reproduce using the toxic chemical arsenic. (NASA) (Science)
- 8 December
  - SpaceX's Dragon spacecraft becomes the first commercial spacecraft ever to be successfully retrieved from orbit.
  - Archaeologist of University of Chicago Press Journals state a previously rich and productive stretch of land, now lying underwater beneath the Persian Gulf, might have sheltered some of the first human communities beyond Africa, based on a recent publication.
- 15 December – A US cancer patient who received a stem cell transplant has been cured of HIV, say a team of German doctors whose research was published in the peer-reviewed journal Blood. (AFP)
- 22 December – Fossil hunters in southwestern China uncover the remains of an ancient marine ecosystem; dating back 252 million years, the site is filled with over 20,000 fossils, including plants, carnivorous fish and large reptiles. (The Guardian) (Proc. R. Soc. B)
- 26 December – Michał Kusiak of Poland's Jagiellonian University discovers the Solar and Heliospheric Observatory's (SOHO) 1,999th and 2,000th comets. (SOHO)

== Prizes ==
=== Abel Prize ===
- 2010 Abel Prize: John T. Tate

=== Fields Medal ===
- 2010 Fields Medal: Elon Lindenstrauss, Ngô Bảo Châu, Stanislav Smirnov and Cédric Villani

=== Nobel Prize ===
- 2010 Nobel Prize in Physiology or Medicine: Robert G. Edwards
- 2010 Nobel Prize in Physics: Andre Geim and Konstantin Novoselov
- 2010 Nobel Prize in Chemistry: Richard F. Heck, Ei-ichi Negishi and Akira Suzuki

== Deaths ==
=== January ===
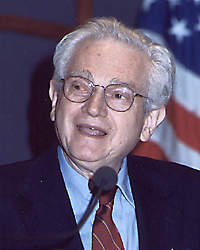
15 January 2010: Marshall Warren Nirenberg, a Nobel Prize-winning American biochemist, dies aged 82.

- 3 January
  - John Keith Irwin (b. 1929), sociologist, specialist in the American prison system.
  - Francis Gillingham (b. 1916), neurosurgeon, stereotactic surgery pioneer.
- 10 January – Donald Acheson (b. 1926), epidemiologist, former UK Chief Medical Officer.
- 12 January – Masoud Alimohammadi (b. c.1960), Iranian physicist, assassination victim.
- 13 January – Edward Brinton (b. 1924), oceanographer and marine biologist.
- 15 January
  - Marshall Warren Nirenberg (b. 1927), biochemist and geneticist, Nobel laureate.
  - Michael Creeth (b. 1924), biochemist, confirmed hydrogen bonds in DNA.
- 21 January – Lawrence Garfinkel (b. 1922), epidemiologist, worked on link between lung cancer and smoking.
- 26 January – Geoffrey Burbidge (b. 1925), astronomer, B^{2}FH coauthor.
- 28 January – Patricia Clarke (b. 1919), biochemist.
- 30 January – Bruce Mitchell (b. 1920), Old English scholar.
- 31 January – Howard Lotsof (b. 1943), discovered anti-addictive properties of ibogaine.

=== February ===
- 2 February
  - Donald Wiseman (b. 1918), archeologist, specialist in Assyriology.
  - Svetozar Kurepa (b. 1925), mathematician.
- 4 February
  - Carl E. Taylor (b. 1916), physician, key author of Alma Ata Declaration.
  - D. Van Holliday (b. 1940), underwater acoustics specialist.
  - Richard Lashof (b. 1922), topologist.
- 9 February – Albert Kligman (b. 1916), controversial dermatologist, discovered tretinoin topical uses.
- 11 February – Arthur H. Hayes Jr. (b. 1933), pharmacologist, former US Commissioner of Food and Drugs.
- 12 February – Sheldon Gilgore (b. 1932), endocrinologist and pharmaceutical executive.
- 14 February – John Thorbjarnarson (b. 1957), crocodilian specialist.
- 17 February – Hans Henning Ørberg (b. 1920), linguist.
- 19 February – Walter Plowright (b. 1923), veterinary scientist, developed rinderpest vaccine.
- 21 February – Jacek Karpiński (b. 1927), computer scientist.
- 26 February – Jacques J. Polak (b. 1914), IMF economist.
- 27 February – Eli Fischer-Jørgensen (b. 1911), phonetician.

=== March ===
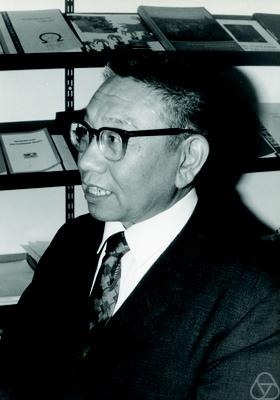
22 March 2010: Ky Fan, a Chinese-American mathematician and theorist, dies aged 95.

- 2 March – Charles B. Moore (b. 1920), engineer.
- 4 March
  - André Bouchard (b. 1946), ecologist, landscape ecology specialist.
  - Joanne Simpson (b. 1923), first female meteorology PhD recipient.
- 6 March – Cho Gyeong-chul (b. 1929), astronomer.
- 8 March – Georgiy Zatsepin (b. 1917), astrophysicist, co-namesake of the Greisen–Zatsepin–Kuzmin limit.
- 11 March
  - Colin Wells (b. 1933), historian and archeologist.
  - Arnall Patz (b. 1920), ophthalmologist, Lasker Award recipient.
- 13 March – Ian Axford (b. 1933), space scientist.
- 15 March – Lucien Campeau (b. 1927), cardiologist, pioneered several techniques.
- 20 March – Robin Milner (b. 1934), computer scientist.
- 22 March
  - Ky Fan (b. 1914), Chinese-American mathematician.
  - James W. Black (b. 1924), physician and pharmacologist, Nobel laureate.
- 24 March – Oswaldo Frota-Pessoa (b. 1917), physician and biologist.

=== April ===
- 2 April – David Halliday (b. 1916), American physics textbooks author.
- 5 April – Helen Ranney (b. 1920), American hematologist, sickle cell anemia specialist.
- 7 April – Valentin Turchin (b. 1931), Russian computer scientist.
- 8 April – Guy Kewney (b. 1946), British technology journalist.
- 9 April – Guyford Stever (b. 1916), American physicist and engineer.
- 12 April – James F. Masterson (b. 1926), American psychiatrist.
- 14 April – Alice Miller (b. 1923), Polish-born Swiss psychologist.
- 18 April – Ian McTaggart-Cowan (b. 1910), Scottish-born Canadian zoologist and ecologist
- 24 April – Angus Maddison (b. 1926), British economist.
- 26 April – Aksel C. Wiin-Nielsen (b. 1924), Danish meteorologist.
- 27 April
  - Nossrat Peseschkian (b. 1933), Iranian-born German neurologist and psychiatrist.
  - Stanley Greenspan (b. 1941), American pediatric psychiatrist.

=== May ===
- 3 May – Guenter Wendt (b. 1923), space engineer.
- 4 May – Hadi Soesastro (b. 1945), economist.
- 11 May – Robert H. Burris (b. 1914), biochemist, pioneer in nitrogen fixation research.
- 13 May – Paul Garabedian (b. 1927), applied mathematician.
- 15 May – John Shepherd-Barron (b. 1925), inventor of the automatic teller machine.

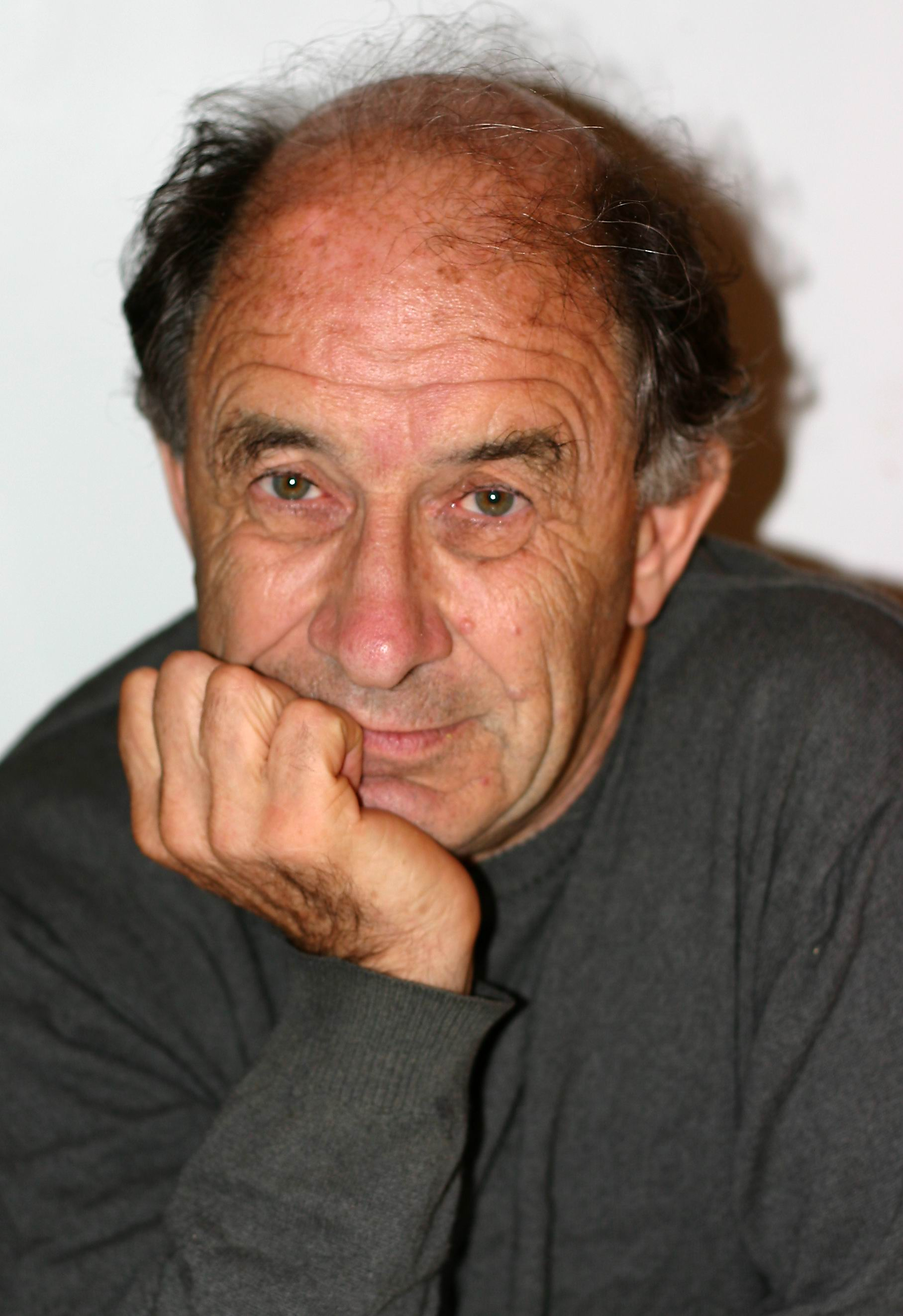
3 June 2010: Vladimir Arnold, a Russian mathematician, dies aged 72.

- 17 May
  - Fritz Sennheiser (b. 1912), engineer and inventor of the shotgun microphone.
  - Richard Gregory (b. 1923), neuropsychologist.
- 18 May
  - Devendra Singh (b. 1938), evolutionary psychology pioneer.
  - John Gooders (b. 1937), birdwatcher and ornithology writer.
- 20 May – Walter Rudin (b. 1921), mathematics textbook author.
- 22 May – Martin Gardner (b. 1914), recreational mathematics writer and debunker of pseudoscience.
- 28 May – Hugh Ford (b. 1913), engineer.
- 30 May – Paul Müller (b. 1940), biologist.

=== June ===
- 3 June
  - Paul Malliavin (b. 1925), mathematician.
  - Vladimir Arnold (b. 1937), mathematician, solved Hilbert's thirteenth problem.
- 4 June – Raymond Allchin (b. 1923), archeologist.
- 8 June – Joan Hinton (b. 1921), nuclear physicist, Manhattan Project participant.
- 11 June – Fred Plum (b. 1924), neurologist, coma specialist.
- 12 June – Richard Keynes (b. 1919), physiologist, edited Charles Darwin's works.
- 15 June – Charles Thomas Beer (b. 1915), organic chemist.
- 18 June – Robert Galambos (b. 1914), neuroscientist, demonstrated use of echolocation in bats.
- 20 June – Harry B. Whittington (b. 1916), paleontologist, Woodwardian Professor of Geology.
- 25 June – Brian Flowers, Baron Flowers (b. 1924), physicist.
- 28 June – Clement Finch (b. 1915), hematologist.

=== July ===
- 2 July
  - Carl Adam Petri (b. 1926), mathematician.
  - Leonard Searle (b. 1930), astronomer.

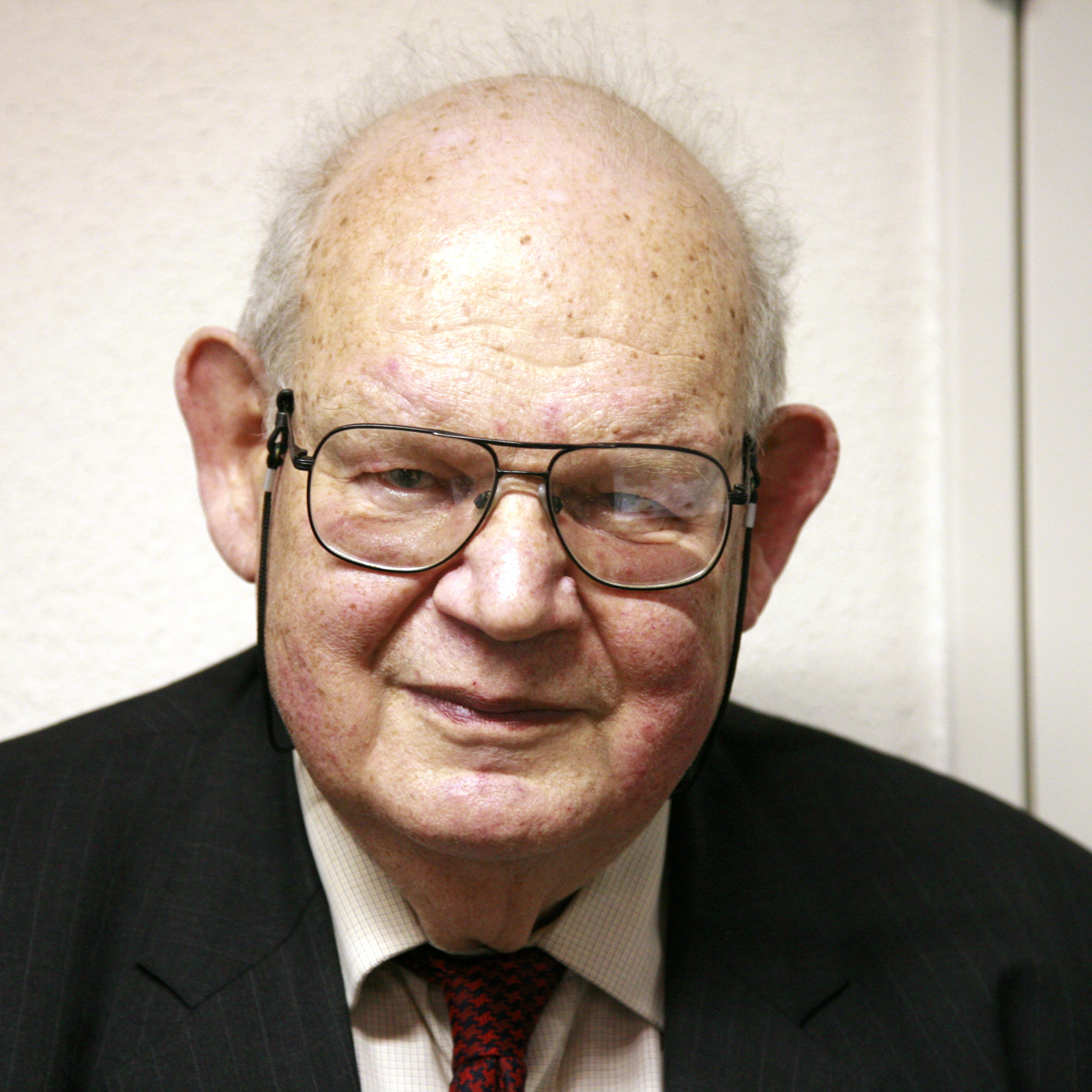
14 October 2010: Benoît Mandelbrot, a French-American mathematician, dies aged 85.

- 8 July
  - David Blackwell (b. 1919), statistician, first African-American member of the United States National Academy of Sciences.
  - Thomas C. Peebles (b. 1921), physician, isolated the measles virus.
- 19 July
  - Gerson Goldhaber (b. 1924), particle physicist.
  - Stephen Schneider (b. 1945), climate scientist.
  - David Warren (b. 1925), aviation scientist.
- 21 July – Herbert Giersch (b. 1921), economist.
- 29 July
  - Nicolae Popescu (b. 1937), mathematician.
  - Zheng Ji (b. 1900), biochemist and nutritionist.
- 30 July
  - Robert M. Chanock (b. 1924), pediatrician and virologist.
  - Chien Wei-zang (b. 1913), physicist.

=== September ===
- 8 September – George C. Williams (b. 1926), evolutionary biologist and theorist.
- 21 September – Jerrold E. Marsden (b. 1942), applied mathematician.

=== October ===
- 14 October – Benoît Mandelbrot (b. 1924), Polish-born French-American mathematician, pioneer of the study of fractals.

== See also ==
- 2010 in spaceflight
- List of emerging technologies
- List of years in science
