= Anita Maris Boggs =

Economist, film distributor (1888–1937)

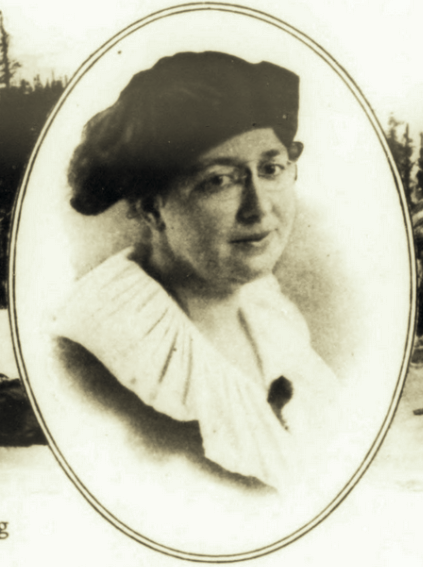
- Boggs in 1920
- Born: Anita Uarda Maris Boggs; November 14, 1888; Philadelphia, Pennsylvania, U.S.
- Died: July 12, 1937 (aged 49); Jerusalem, Palestine
- Other name: A. Maris Boggs
- Education: Bryn Mawr College; University of Pennsylvania
- Occupations: economist; educator; philanthropist
- Known for: Co-founder, Bureau of Commercial Economics
- Notable work: Vision
- Awards: Order of the White Lion of Czechoslovakia

Anita Maris Boggs (A. Maris Boggs or Maris Boggs; 1888–1937) was an American economist, educator, and philanthropist. She was the co-founder of the Bureau of Commercial Economics (BCE), its film library being one of the largest of the kind in its day, and the only one that was international; by 1920, it had the largest educational film library in the world.

Boggs served as President of the Washington, D.C. Chapter of the League of American Penwomen; and was a Fellow of the American Geographic Society. She was a recipient of the Order of the White Lion.

== Early life and education ==
Anita Uarda Maris Boggs was born in Philadelphia, Pennsylvania, on November 14, 1888. Her parents were Benjamin R. and Mary Emma (Maris) Boggs. Anita had a brother, Randolph Maris Boggs (born 1887).

She was educated at Bryn Mawr College (A.B., 1910) and University of Pennsylvania (M.A., 1911).

== Career ==
In 1913, Boggs and Francis Holley co-founded the BCE. Boggs served as its dean until 1922, when she took over as director, with Holley dying the next year. The aim of the bureau was promoting amity between the nations. Both of the founders were firm believers in what was termed visual education. She traveled around the world and was the guest of several foreign governments that asked her to assist them in establishing the work of the bureau in their countries so that their people might receive the benefits of the service it extended. Boggs had financial means and accepted no salary.

Boggs was a special collaborator in visual instruction with the U.S. Bureau of Education, 1915–25; Traveling widely, Boggs was familiar with a multiple foreign languages, including, Arabic. She served as an educational representative in the U.S. of the government of Canada, Australia, Argentine, France, Great Britain, Japan, Bolivia, and others; associate director, department of public service, Motion Picture Theatre Owners of America, 1921–2; and as Councillor for Native Americans.

Boggs wrote magazine articles on educational motion pictures and philosophy, as well as international finance, economics, and tariffs. She served as editor of the BCE's official organ, Vision; and as President of the Washington, D.C. Chapter of the League of American Penwomen.

She was a member of the Bryn Mawr Alumnae association, and Trail Riders of the Rockies; honorary life member of the Maryland Academy of Science; honorary member, Medical Academy of Science and the Cleveland Photographic Society; and vice-president, American International Academy. Boggs was a Fellow of the American Geographic Society.

== Personal life ==
Boggs was a resident of Washington, D.C. from 1913. She never married.

In 1934, Boggs traveled to Europe and Western Asia with Dorothy Quincy Smith, her traveling companion. After requiring surgery in Bethlehem in January 1935, Boggs was unable to continue traveling. She died in Jerusalem, Palestine, on July 12, 1937.

== Awards and honors ==
- Order of the White Lion of Czechoslovakia
- Boggs received thanks of the U.S. Government and of various other nations, for constructive work in behalf of humanity.

== Selected works ==
=== Translator ===
- Belgian Schools for Crippled Soldiers (1918), by Leon de Paeuw, translated by A. Maris Boggs
