= RCPS =

RCPS may refer to:

- Rockdale County School District, also referred to as Rockdale County Public Schools or RCPS
- Rockingham County Public Schools, Virginia, U.S.
- Rock Point Community School
- Royal College of Physicians and Surgeons (disambiguation)
- Royal Cornwall Polytechnic Society, Falmouth, England, U.K.
- Rigid cellular polystyrene, a building insulation material

== See also ==
- RCP (disambiguation)
