= Bureau of Commercial Economics =

U.S. American non-profit organization

Bureau of Commercial Economics (BCE) was an American non-profit, non-governmental, philanthropic film distribution organization. Established in Philadelphia, Pennsylvania, in 1913, the headquarters were soon shifted to Washington, D.C. The film library was one of the largest of the kind in its day, and the only one that was international. In 1920, the Bureau had the largest educational film library in the world.

The Bureau's object was the lending of educational and industrial moving picture films for free display. It was an altruistic association using the facilities and instrumentalities of government, business, and educational institutions in the dissemination of useful information through motion pictures, by lecturers, and publications. BCE provided pictures for millions of people who had never heard of motion pictures, and to some who didn't know there were such things as photographs. It was an international free circulating library for helpful and worthwhile motion pictures. It competed with no one, earned no profits, and, kept out of every field that was covered by others. Most of its work was carried on through others, as with the extension departments of state universities and other colleges. The only condition attached to supplying pictures for distribution anywhere was that no charge.

== Establishment ==
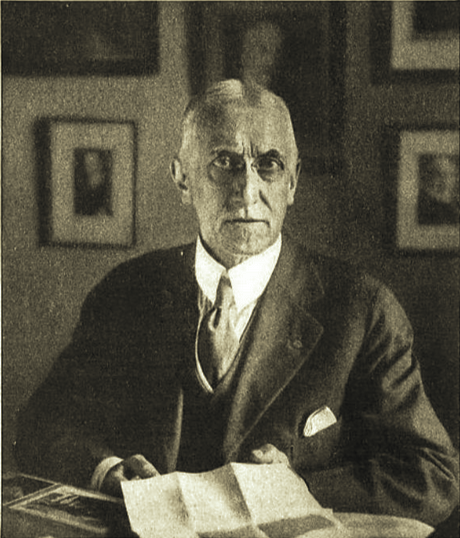
Dr. Francis Holley (1921)

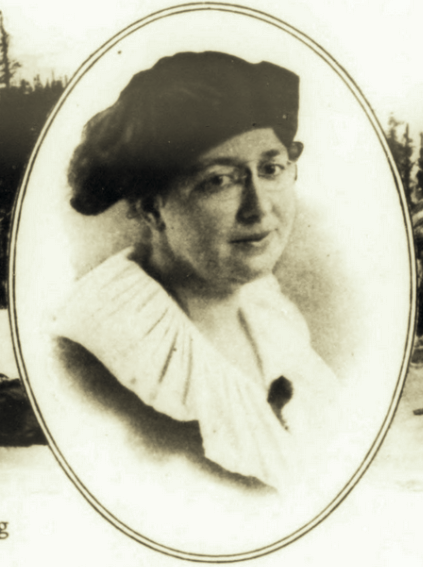
Anita Maris Boggs (1920)

Francis Holley was an engineer by profession. Because of excessive use of his eyes at night in the poor light of railroad construction camps, he lost his sight, and for eighteen years, searched for a cure. In 1893, at the age of thirty, he went to Aix-la-Chapelle for treatment. The German government was holding in Düsseldorf its biennial exhibition of the manufactures of the empire. This exhibition was also a vocational guide to the youth of Germany at government expense. Holley conceived the idea that the exhibition would be even more of a success if taken to the homes of the boys by means of motion pictures. He told his idea to the then kalser and to the minister of education. They approved and told him to go ahead. He did so and met with considerable success, despite the inadequacies of the motion pictures of those days. In 1913, he began to organize the Bureau with Anita Maris Boggs.

After Holley regained his vision, his work materialized into the BCE in 1913, being conceived and founded by him and Boggs. In its first year, Holley served as director, Boggs as Assistant Director and Secretary, Thurman Hendricks McCoy as Financial Secretary, Halvor Midtbo as Foreign Secretary, and Rhys Harrower North as Consultant Architect and Engineer.

At first, Holley maintained the work at his own expense. Its growth made it necessary for him to give others the opportunity to participate in the philanthropic work. The work of the Bureau was perpetuated through the election of its directing officers by an advisory council composed of college presidents and men in science and letters.

After the death of Holley, the work was carried on by Anita Boggs and her brother, Randolph M. Boggs.

== Financial model ==
The BCE was maintained through endowment funds and annuities, and was purely philanthropic. It did not accept any remuneration for the exhibition of any reel or slide. It was maintained through contributions and annuities. Contributions were invariably voluntary, and no one was authorized to solicit the same or in any way whatsoever to sell the circulation of the Bureau. No film was shown for a money consideration under any circumstances, nor was preference given a film or a subject on account of a contribution. Contributions were received and acceptable only to an amount sufficient to cover transportation charges, insurance and upkeep of the films, and the incidental expenses of administration, as the Bureau was not operated for profit and had no capital stock.

A membership cost US$25 annually and entitled the member organization to one film week which made the cost about US$.50 for each one. If, however, the organization or institution desiring the film was not in a position to pay for a membership the films are sent anyway. The only requirement was that the exhibitor must have their own projection machine and must pay the transportation charges.

== Cooperating entities ==
It was an association of the governments, institutions, manufacturers, producers, transportation lines and individuals of the United States and foreign countries, to engage in disseminating geographical, commercial, industrial, vocational welfare and public health information by the graphic method of motography. Cooperating and allied were the governments of the United States, France, British empire, Canada, Australia, South Africa, Newfoundland, Argentina, Bolivia, India, Italy, China, Spain, Japan, Mexico, Nicaragua, Morocco, Switzerland, The Netherlands, Guatemala, Dutch East Indies, Denmark, Sweden, Costa Rica, Brazil, San Salvador and Cuba.

The Bureau also had the cooperation of the United States Chamber of Commerce, s, Kiwanis, American Association of Engineers, the American Legion, Pan-American Union, Pan-Pacific Union, and the Motion Picture Theater Owners of America. The BCE cooperated with schools and public officials throughout the U.S.

== Operations ==
The purpose of the BCE was the promotion of international amity and the free dissemination of information by means of educational films, lectures, and printed matter of a strictly educational nature to all parts of the world. Membership was open to individuals, universities, organizations of established credit, and governments. The divisions of the Bureau were: educational films, research, scholarships, councilors for the American Indians, natural resources, lectures, and conservation of public moneys.

The Bureau was unofficial for the reason that to be officially a part of any government would preclude the possibility of carrying on its work in foreign countries or displaying foreign films locally. It was, however, affiliated with educational institutions, thus facilitating a general movement in universal public instruction.

Practically all of the films sent from the U.S. were in English and it was believed that from these, the citizens of other countries would unconsciously acquire some knowledge of English. At first an effort was made to translate the titles into the language of the country to which they were being sent but this did not always prove successful.

The films were available only when admittance to the public was free. The requirements were: payment of transportation charges, use of standard motion picture projectors by competent operators, reports of films used and attendance after each performance, immediate return of films used, and no admission fee to be charged.

== Film library ==
Films were contributed by cooperating Governments, motion-picture people, philanthropic organizations, industrial associations, and manufacturers, as well as by anyone who had a picture they wanted to see given wide circulation. The only condition attached to the acceptance and distribution of a picture was that it be truthful, and educational or helpful. By 1921, the BCE owned between 30,000,000–40,000,000 feet (9,100,000–12,200,000 m) of picture film.

The Bureau would not accept any film of any industry where due consideration was not clearly shown to the employees or where children were employed under oppressive or inappropriate conditions. Nor would the Bureau show a film of the production of foodstuffs where the pure-food laws were not complied with strictly. It also did not display any film dealing with the production of intoxicants of any nature or with the making of any products of tobacco.

The BCE engaged in disseminating geographical, commercial, industrial and vocational information by the graphic method of motography, showing how things in common use were made or produced, and under what conditions. Its aim was to show through the films the production of articles in common use, to reveal the sources of supply, and to follow the raw material to the finished product. In addition to the industrial and scientific films which the Bureau circulated, it had a series of travelogues on all the national parks and on the scenery of the U.S., Canada, Australia, South Africa, India, and Egypt. It also circulated films of the U.S. Government and of the Governments of the Dominions of the U.K., France, and Argentina.

== Service areas ==
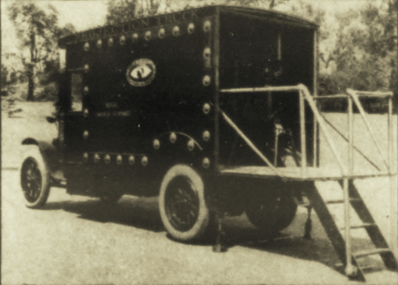
BCE truck in the U.S.

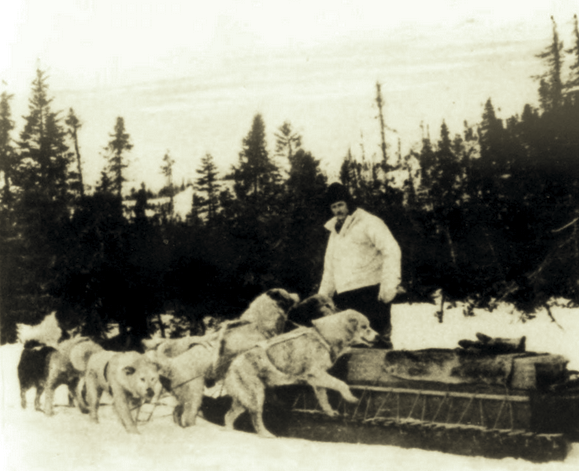
Alaska

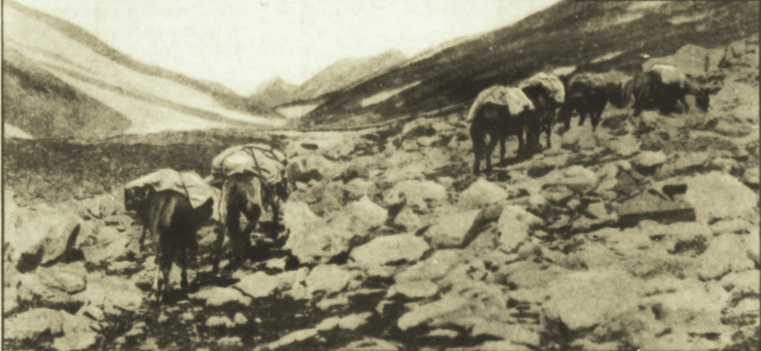
Canada

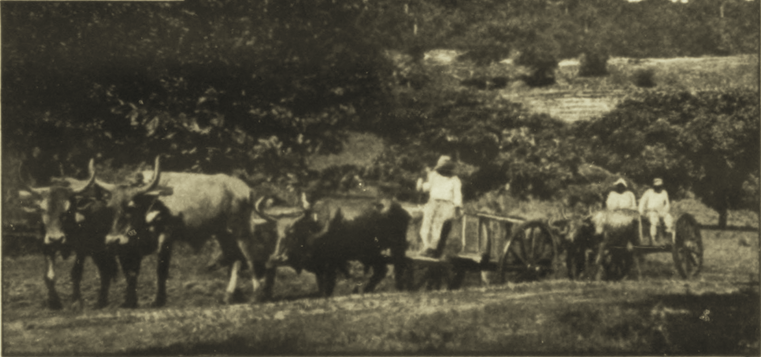
Dutch West Indies

Through its agencies, Holley and his associates claimed, more than 60,000,000 persons in all parts of the world annually viewed motion pictures that they would probably never have seen otherwise.

The service of the Bureau was available in Canada, Latin American Republics, India, China, Japan, Australia, New Zealand and South Africa.

The Bureau displayed its reels and slides in universities, colleges, technical and agricultural schools, public libraries, state armories, high schools, people's institutes, public institutions, state granges, settlement houses, missions, chambers of commerce, boards of trade, commercial clubs, rotary clubs, trade conventions, welfare forums of corporations, fraternal organizations; also with powerful projectors, operated from auto trucks, in parks, playgrounds, rural communities and other centers for the general public.

The films traveled in every way necessary, from pack train to bullock cart, from dog sled to motor truck. From its library, with distributing stations in many places, the films were sent to places as remote as Spitzbergen and the interior of Siberia where its pictures were shown on river boats, with sails for screens.

Specially constructed motor trucks were employed by the Bureau in its educational campaign. Each truck contained its own electric light plant, and carried a standard projection machine at the rear end, and a collapsible steel frame which, when set up, supported a projection screen 20 feet wide and 36 feet high. The generator on the truck supplied the necessary current for a number of flood lights placed in the sides of the car body. These trucks carried instructive films to the remotest districts. During World War I, the service of the Bureau was placed at the disposal of the U.S. government and contributed materially to the success of the Liberty Loan campaigns and the various drives for charitable or patriotic purposes.

By 1925, the BCE was asked to organize all the nations bordering on the Pacific Ocean into an international association for the purpose of exchanging educational motion pictures of all member nations with each other. Films that depicted national life, business, environment, sanitation, welfare work, were to pass from nation to nation like spokes of a wheel, with the BCE as the hub.

== Speakers and publications ==
For large audiences, the Bureau provided, without expense, special lecturers.

Speakers of international reputation were sent by this Bureau throughout the U.S. in connection with President Coolidge's national outdoor recreation conference to urge people in the U.S. to take a greater interest and part in outdoor life, and films of fishing, hunting, swimming, playgrounds, have been used to help build the health of the U.S.

Miscellaneous publications were issued from time to time.
