= Francis Holley =

American railroad engineer (1868–1923)

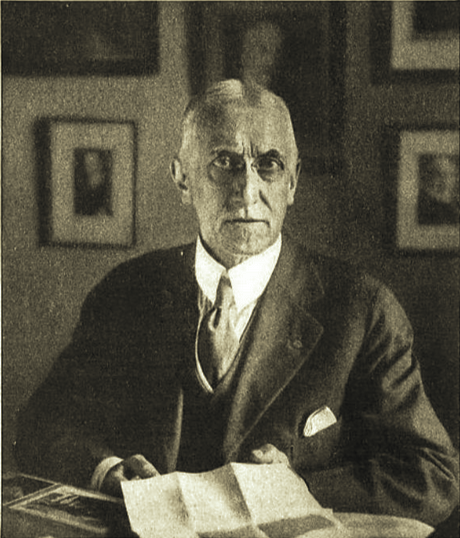
- Holley in 1921
- Born: 1868; Cook County, Illinois, U.S.
- Died: December 12, 1923 (aged 54–55); Rochester, Minnesota, U.S.
- Occupation: railroad engineer
- Known for: Co-founder, Bureau of Commercial Economics

Francis Holley (1868 – December 12, 1923) was an American railroad engineer and co-founder of the Bureau of Commercial Economics. Its film library was one of the largest of the kind in its day, and the only one that was international. In 1920, the Bureau had the largest educational film library in the world.

== Early life and education ==
Francis Holley was born in Cook County, Illinois, in 1868.

Self-educated, his only schooling was a winter's attendance at night school in New York.

== Career ==
Holley began working at the age of thirteen as a messenger in an engineering corps on the Northern Pacific Survey.

He became an engineer by profession, and for many years was a railroad builder, being at one time chief engineer for the Northern Pacific Railroad. In 1893, at the age of thirty, Holley became totally blind due to excessive use of his eyes at night in the poor light of railroad construction camps.

For eighteen years, Holley searched for a cure to his blindness, including a trip to Aix-la-Chapelle, Germany for treatment. While there, the German government was holding in Düsseldorf its biennial exhibition of the manufactures of the empire. This exhibition was also a vocational guide to the youth of Germany at government expense. Holley conceived the idea that the exhibition would be even more of a success if taken to the homes of the boys by means of motion pictures. He told his idea to the then kalser and to the minister of education. They approved and told him to go ahead. He did so and met with considerable success, despite the inadequacies of the motion pictures of those days.

After his sight was regained and in gratitude for this, Holley decided to devote the remainder of his life to broadening the views of others and enabling them to see and appreciate the wonders of the world through movie films. In 1913, he began to organize the bureau with Anita Maris Boggs.

Holley held an honorary college degree, and later in life, served on the faculty of the American University, in Washington, D.C., where he filled the chair of visual education.

== Personal life ==
Holley was unmarried.

In early 1923, Holley had an operation at the Mayo hospital in Rochester, Minnesota, and returned to Washington, D.C. He died at the Mayo hospital on December 12, 1923.

== Selected works ==
- The Army of the Vigilantes, Recruiting for National Defense, 1916 (text)
