= Cancer Prevention Study =

Series of epidemiological studies conducted by the American Cancer Society

The Cancer Prevention Study (frequently abbreviated CPS) is the name of a series of cohort studies conducted in the United States by the American Cancer Society.

== CPS-I ==
The first Cancer Prevention Study, known as CPS-I, recruited subjects between October 1959 and February 1960. This study included more than 1 million men and women. The participants were followed until 1972. The study showed that the increase in lung cancer mortality rates in women during the study's time period occurred only in smoking women. It has been described as "a key guide to national policy and changing public attitudes" with regard to the link between cigarette smoking and lung cancer.

== CPS-II ==
The second Cancer Prevention Study, known as Cancer Prevention Study II or CPS-II, is a prospective study involving about 1.2 million American men and women, recruited by 77,000 American Cancer Society volunteers. It began in 1982 under the direction of Lawrence Garfinkel. Subjects examined in this study include putative cancer risk factors such as obesity and diet.

== CPS-3 ==
The third Cancer Prevention Study, known as CPS-3, began enrollment in 2006 and completed recruitment in December 2013. The study includes over 304,000 participants.
