= Central Police Station =

Central Police Station may refer to:

- 77 North Front Street, former Central Police Station of Columbus, Ohio
- Central Police Station (Hong Kong)
- Central Police Station (St. Joseph, Missouri)
- Central Police Station, Bristol
- Central Police Station, Tampere
- Sydney Central Police Station

== See also ==
- Steelhouse Lane police station, Birmingham, England
