= Sheldon Gilgore =

American physician and executive

Sheldon Gilgore (February 13, 1932 – February 12, 2010) was an American physician and executive who served as president of Pfizer and CEO of G.D. Searle. He also served as chairman of the board of Clark University and was a member of the founding family of the Connecticut Grand Opera.

Gilgore was trained as an endocrinologist. Gilgore retired from Searle in 1995.
