= College of Physicians and Surgeons =

There are several educational institutions that are called the College of Physicians and Surgeons:

== Canada ==
- College of Physicians and Surgeons of Alberta
- College of Physicians and Surgeons of British Columbia
- College of Physicians and Surgeons of Manitoba
- College of Physicians and Surgeons of Ontario
- College of Physicians and Surgeons of Saskatchewan

== India ==
- College of Physicians & Surgeons of Mumbai, India

== Pakistan ==
- College of Physicians and Surgeons Pakistan

== United States ==
- College of Physicians and Surgeons (San Francisco), later became the Arthur A. Dugoni School of Dentistry, California
- College of Physicians and Surgeons (Chicago), later became the University of Illinois College of Medicine, Illinois
- College of Physicians and Surgeons (Baltimore), merged with the University of Maryland School of Medicine, Maryland
- Columbia University Vagelos College of Physicians and Surgeons, New York

== See also ==
- College of Physicians
- Royal College of Physicians and Surgeons (disambiguation)
