= Royal College of Physicians and Surgeons =

Royal College of Physicians and Surgeons may refer to:

- Royal College of Physicians and Surgeons of Canada
- Royal College of Physicians and Surgeons of Glasgow, Scotland, UK

== See also ==
- Royal College of Physicians
- Royal College of Surgeons
- College of Physicians and Surgeons (disambiguation)
