= Colin Wells (historian) =

British historian and archaeologist (1933–2010)

- Born: Colin Michael Wells; November 15, 1933; West Bridgford
- Died: March 11, 2010 (aged 76); North Wales
- Other name: Colin M. Wells
- Education: Oriel College
- Alma mater: University of Ottawa; University of Oxford; Trinity University
- Spouse: Kate (m. 1960)
- Children: 2
- Scientific career
- Fields: History

Colin Michael Wells (15 November 1933 in West Bridgford – 11 March 2010 in North Wales) was a British historian of ancient Rome, as well as scholar and archaeologist of classical antiquities.

== Biography ==
After studying at Oriel College, Oxford, from 1952 to 1954, he left university for military service. He joined the 41st Field Regiment, Royal Artillery and was stationed in Egypt and Germany. He returned to Oxford and gained his B.A. in 1958 and M.A. in 1959. He also served as a lieutenant in the South Nottinghamshire Hussars Yeomanry, Royal Horse Artillery.

Wells moved to Ottawa in 1960, where he taught Latin, Ancient History, and Archaeology at the Department of Classical Studies at the University of Ottawa. He earned his DPhil from University of Oxford in 1965 under the supervision of Ian Richmond. His thesis was titled "The Frontiers of the Empire Under Augustus". He went on to chair the department in Ottawa.

His 1972 work, The German Policy of Augustus, presented new archaeological evidence concerning Augustus' German campaigns. Mark Hassall in The Journal of Roman Studies said it was "an authoritative study of Augustan military activity in Germany and the archaeological evidence for it, by a scholar who must certainly know more about his subject than any save those actually engaged on the recovery of the primary archaeological material". According to R. Bruce Hitchner, "Wells was generally acknowledged to be the leading English-language scholar on the Roman army and frontier in Germany". In 1992 Malcolm Todd wrote that The German Policy of Augustus "has still not been matched by a synthesis of comparable range and since 1972 there has been a quantum leap in knowledge resulting from the definitive publication of key sites and the discovery of several hitherto unknown Augustan bases".

His second work, The Roman Empire, surveyed the Empire from 44 BC to 235 AD and was groundbreaking in its use of archaeological evidence.

In 1987, Wells moved to San Antonio in Texas, where he took up the first T. Frank Murchison Distinguished Professorship of Classical Studies at Trinity University. Here he founded a new Department of Classical Studies. He taught there until his retirement in 2005.

After his retirement he moved with his wife to live in Normandy, near Saint-Lô. He died of a stroke in North Wales in 2010. He and his wife had two children.

== Studies ==
His fields of interest includes social and economic history of ancient Rome, with particular regard to military matters, Roman Africa and the transition of the Islamic North Africa, Germany and the Roman geopolitical issues pertaining to the Roman Limes, for which there was interest from the earliest publications.

Wells also had an active role as an archaeologist of the ancient Punic and Roman antiquities of provinces: at Carthage from 1976 to 1986, he directed the excavations made by the second Canadian team, under the "Save Carthage" promoted by UNESCO, a task which he continued under the auspices of Trinity University, and of which he was director since 1991.

== Works ==
- The German Policy of Augustus: An Examination of the Archaeological Evidence (Oxford: Clarendon Press, 1972). ISBN 0198131623
- The Roman Empire (Stanford University Press, 1984; 2nd edn, Fontana, 1992 (UK)/Harvard University Press). ISBN 0804712379, ISBN 0674777700
