= Tampere Police Station =

Building in Tampere, Finland

Coordinates: 61°29′36″N 23°46′17″E

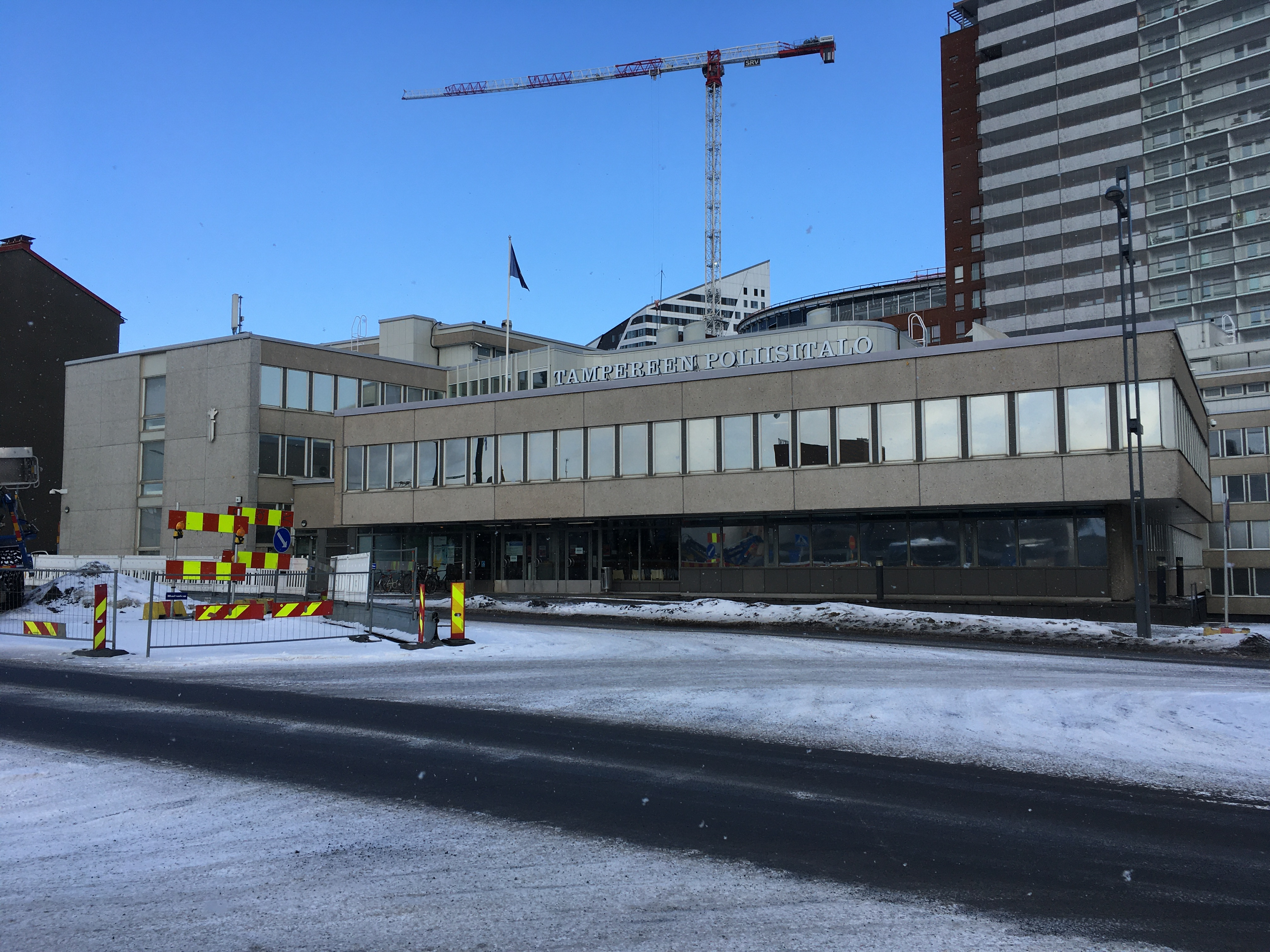
Tampere Police Station viewed from the Hatanpää Highway in March 2021

The Tampere Police Station (or the Tampere Central Police Station; Finnish: Tampereen poliisitalo, Swedish: Tammerfors polishus) is a police station located in the Ratina district in Tampere, Finland, and also the administrative center of the Central Finland Police Department. The police station is also used by the Finnish Security Intelligence Service (SUPO). There are about 400 police officers working there and about 50 others. The police station consists of two buildings located near the Tampere Bus Station along the Hatanpää Highway and Sorinkatu streets; due to this, in Tampere colloquially, the police station and its surroundings are also known as Sori by locals.

The station is owned by Senate Properties.

== History ==
The oldest, three-storey building of the police building was designed by architect Pekka Ilveskoski and was completed on the Hatanpää Highway in 1963. The five-storey part on Sorinkatu dates from 1993 and was designed by architect Osmo Lappo. The old and new sides of the police station are connected by gateways that run under and over Sorinkatu.

In 1919–1963, before the completion of the current premises, the Tampere Police Station operated in the building of the former City Hotel (Kaupunginhotelli) on the Kauppakatu street.

== See also ==
- List of police departments in Finland
- Tampere Central Fire Station
- Tampere University Hospital
