= Coalition for Positive Sexuality =

Coalition for Positive Sexuality was an Internet-based comprehensive sexuality education website, for youth and young adults.

The most commonly used feature of the CPS website is the "Let's Talk" feature, which allows youth members to post anonymously and receive answers to sexual health-related questions from moderators.

== Staff and moderators ==
CPS staff and moderators are graduate and doctoral-level health educators, researchers, legal professionals, counselors and advocates with years of professional experience addressing myriad adolescent health issues, including teen pregnancy prevention, sexual orientation, reproductive health laws, and sexually transmitted infections (STI) and HIV/AIDS prevention.

== See also ==
- Health education
