= Corel Photo House =

Raster graphics editor

Corel Photo House is a discontinued raster graphics editor, replaced by Corel Photo-Paint. Corel Photo House was sometimes distributed free with image scanners such as the HP ScanJet. Corel Photo House saved images in the proprietary CPS image file format, which is however not supported by Paint Shop Pro or Corel Photo-Paint. Corel Photo House was a photo-editing and bitmap creation program that made it easy to touch up photographs, add text and special effects, or create Bitmap images.
