= Lawrence Garfinkel =

Lawrence Garfinkel (January 11, 1922 – January 21, 2010) was an American epidemiologist involved in demonstrating the link between smoking and lung cancer.

After graduating from high school at age 15, he attended City College of New York. His college career was interrupted by World War II. After the attack on Pearl Harbor, Garfinkel joined the Army, serving in France. After months in hospital after being seriously wounded, he returned to City College earning a bachelor's degree in statistics. He later earned a master's degree from Columbia University.

An early job at the American Cancer Society, where he was hired as a statistical clerk, turned into a 43-year career. Over time, he learned the tools of epidemiology and rose to become a leader in the field.

In the early 1950s, scientists began to suspect the link between smoking and cancer, but statistically valid evidence didn't yet exist. An early study that he performed with his seniors, tracking more than 150,000 people for about 3 and a half years, demonstrated a significant correlation. This landmark study was just the first of numerous, increasingly ambitious studies, tracking more than a million people each.

The data from these studies—still being used today—not only conclusively demonstrated the links between smoking and lung cancer, but also collected valuable data on obesity, alcohol use, other cancers, and various other factors.

Garfinkel also worked on studies of the pathology of lung cancer and precancer, and demonstrated statistical correlation between length of smoking and the amount of tissue change. This provided a physiological underpinning to the disease correlations previously established.
