= Cleveland Photographic Society =

US non-profit organization

- Abbreviation: CPS
- Formation: 1887
- Type: Non-profit organization
- Purpose: Photography
- Headquarters: Cleveland, Ohio
- Members: 300
- Affiliations: Photographic Society of America
- Website: Cleveland Photographic Society

The Cleveland Photographic Society (CPS), founded in 1887, is one of the largest and oldest non-profit photography organizations of its kind. Its 300-plus members and associate members include professional and amateur photographers from all over Ohio and the United States.

The official motto of CPS is "Photographers Helping Photographers." The Cleveland Photographic Society holds several notable competitions throughout the year, and has hosted a School of Photography with classes such as Fundamentals of Good Photography that have been taught, with continuous updating, for more than 80 years. The Society has been located in its own building in Broadview Heights, Ohio, since 2005, and has more than doubled its membership since then. During 2009, the group saw the expansion of its clubhouse, with renovations that included a new gathering area with complete kitchen, and a "roof-raising" in the main club room to provide more space and better sight lines for meetings that often attract nearly 100 members and visitors.

The work of 44 of its photographers was included in a book published by Cengage Learning, During its long history, images by Society members have been displayed in two shows at the Smithsonian Institution in Washington, D.C.
