= Azepino(4,5-b)indole =

Azepino[4,5-b]indole

Names
- IUPAC name azepino[4,5-b]indole

Identifiers
3D model (JSmol)	Interactive image
ChemSpider	24777516
PubChem CID	54554802
- InChI: InChI=1S/C12H8N2/c1-2-4-11-9(3-1)10-5-7-13-8-6-12(10)14-11/h1-8H Key: ZMKPMNLSLLYATH-UHFFFAOYSA-N
- SMILES: C1=CC=C2C(=C1)C3=CC=NC=CC3=N2

Properties
Chemical formula	C_{12}H_{8}N_{2}
Molar mass	180.210 g·mol^{−1}
- Except where otherwise noted, data are given for materials in their standard state (at 25 °C [77 °F], 100 kPa). Infobox references

Azepino[4,5-b]indole is a tricyclic chemical compound related to tryptamine and having various alkaloid derivatives. The analogue of azepino[4,5-b]indole with the azepine ring fully hydrogenated, noribogaminalog (1,2,3,4,5,6-hexahydroazepino[4,5-b]indole), is a parent compound of the iboga-type alkaloids such as ibogaine as well as of their simplified ibogalog analogues like ibogainalog.

Chemical structures of selected azepino[4,5-b]indole derivatives
Noribogamine

Ibogamine

Noribogaine

Ibogaine

Tabernanthine

Noribogaminalog

Ibogaminalog

Noribogainalog

Ibogainalog

Tabernanthalog

== See also ==
- Ibogalog
- Iboga-type alkaloid
- Desethylibogamine
- Substituted β-carboline
- PHA-57378
- PNU-22394
- PNU-181731
- Tryptoline
