= Noribogaminalog =

Names
- IUPAC name 1,2,3,4,5,6-Hexahydroazepino[4,5-b]indole
- Other names N-Desmethylibogaminalog

Identifiers
| CAS Number | 7546-78-3 |
| 3D model (JSmol) | Interactive image |
| ChEMBL | ChEMBL310620 |
| ChemSpider | 25647 |
| EC Number | 982-798-9 |
| PubChem CID | 27557 |
| CompTox Dashboard (EPA) | DTXSID60274826 |
- InChI: InChI=1S/C12H14N2/c1-2-4-11-9(3-1)10-5-7-13-8-6-12(10)14-11/h1-4,13-14H,5-8H2 Key: NGUNYFTXLWTSNC-UHFFFAOYSA-N
- SMILES: C1CNCCC2=C1C3=CC=CC=C3N2

Properties
| Chemical formula | C_{12}H_{14}N_{2} |
| Molar mass | 186.258 g·mol^{−1} |
- Except where otherwise noted, data are given for materials in their standard state (at 25 °C [77 °F], 100 kPa). Infobox references

Noribogaminalog, or N-desmethylibogaminalog, also known as 1,2,3,4,5,6-hexahydroazepino[4,5-b]indole, is a chemical compound and parent structure of the ibogalog group of compounds. The ibogalogs that have been described include ibogaminalog, ibogainalog, noribogainalog, tabernanthalog, catharanthalog, fluorogainalog, LS-22925, PNU-22394, and PHA-57378, among others. The ibogalogs, specifically ibogainalog and analogues, were first described in the scientific literature by 1968.

== See also ==
- Ibogalog
- Azepinoindole
- Iboga-type alkaloid
- Desethylibogamine
