= Ibogalog =

Class of chemical compounds

Chemical structure of tabernanthalog (TBG; DLX-007), one of the most well-known ibogalogs.

An ibogalog, or simplified ibogaine analogue, also known as a substituted 1,2,3,4,5,6-hexahydroazepino[4,5-b]indole (or simply substituted hexahydroazepinoindole), is a derivative of noribogaminalog and a simplified analogue of iboga alkaloids and related compounds such as ibogaine. They are tricyclic cyclized tryptamines and are closely related to the β-carbolines or harmala alkaloids. However, ibogalogs have a mostly-hydrogenated 7-membered azepine ring instead of the variably-saturated 6-membered pyridine ring present in β-carbolines. Relative to the iboga alkaloids, ibogalogs retain the indole and hydrogenated azepine rings, but the isoquinuclidine (2-azabicyclo[2.2.2]octane) ring system has been removed, simplifying the chemical structure.

== Use and effects ==
Ibogalogs have been limitedly tested in humans, but anecdotal reports concerning tabernanthalog exist.

== Pharmacology ==
=== Pharmacodynamics ===
Ibogalogs are known to act as potent serotonin 5-HT_{2A} and 5-HT_{2C} receptor agonists, as well as acting as agonists of other serotonin receptors. This is in contrast to iboga alkaloids like ibogaine and noribogaine, which are inactive as serotonin receptor agonists. Ibogalogs also possess other actions, such as serotonin 5-HT_{2B} receptor antagonism or partial agonism, monoamine reuptake inhibition, and nicotinic acetylcholine receptor inhibition. Unlike iboga alkaloids like noribogaine, they show no opioid receptor agonism, for instance of the κ-opioid receptor. In addition, the compounds have dramatically reduced potency at the hERG antitarget compared to ibogaine, which confers much less cardiotoxicity.

Ibogalogs have been reported to produce psychoplastogenic, antidepressant-like, anxiolytic-like, sedative-like, antiaddictive-like, and analgesic effects in animals. Based on the rodent head-twitch response, a behavioral proxy of serotonergic psychedelic activity, ibogainalog may produce psychedelic effects in humans, while other assessed ibogainalogs, including tabernanthalog, ibogaminalog, noribogainalog, and catharanthalog, appear to be non-psychedelic. In addition, PNU-22394 was non-hallucinogenic in clinical studies.

== History ==
Ibogalogs, such as PNU-22394, were first developed and described in the 1960s. In the early 2000s, ibogalogs like PNU-22394 were studied and described further as potential appetite suppressants and weight loss drugs. Subsequently, ibogalogs were studied and described in the early 2020s and thereafter, including by David E. Olson and colleagues at the University of California, Davis and Delix Therapeutics, as potential treatments of central nervous system disorders. Relatedly, tabernanthalog (TBG; DLX-007) is under development for potential medical use.

== List of ibogalogs ==
Structure	Name	Synonyms	Chemical name	Iboga analogue	Ref
	Noribogaminalog		1,2,3,4,5,6-hexahydroazepino[4,5-b]indole	Noribogamine	
	Ibogaminalog	DM-506	3-methyl-2,4,5,6-tetrahydro-1H-azepino[4,5-b]indole	Ibogamine	
	Noribogainalog	Nor-IBG; GATC-021	9-hydroxy-3-methyl-2,4,5,6-tetrahydro-1H-azepino[4,5-b]indole	Noribogaine	
	Ibogainalog	IBG	9-methoxy-3-methyl-2,4,5,6-tetrahydro-1H-azepino[4,5-b]indole	Ibogaine	
	GATC-1021	8-Fluoroibogainalog	8-fluoro-9-methoxy-3-methyl-1,2,3,4,5,6-hexahydroazepino[4,5-b]indole		
	Tabernanthalog	TBG; DLX-007	8-methoxy-3-methyl-2,4,5,6-tetrahydro-1H-azepino[4,5-b]indole	Tabernanthine	
	Catharanthalog	CAG	methyl 3-methyl-1,2,3,4,5,6-hexahydroazepino[4,5-b]indole-5-carboxylate	Catharanthine	
	Pharm-136		7-methyl-10-hydroxy-1,2,3,4,5,6-hexahydroazepino[4,5-b]indole		
	Fluorogainalog		9-fluoro-3-methyl-2,4,5,6-tetrahydro-1H-azepino[4,5-b]indole		
	LS-22925		9-fluoro-1,2,3,4,5,6-hexahydroazepino[4,5-b]indole		
	PNU-22394	U-22394	6-methyl-1,2,3,4,5,6-hexahydroazepino[4,5-b]indole		

== Related compounds ==
Structure	Name	Synonyms	Chemical name	Ref
	4-Allyl-6-oxa-noribogainalog		3-methyl-4-prop-2-enyl-1,2,4,5-tetrahydro-[1]benzofuro[2,3-d]azepin-9-ol	
	PHA-57378		2,7,8,9,10,11-hexahydro-1H-azepino[4,5-b][1,4]oxazino[2,3,4-hi]indole	
	PNU-181731		2,3,4,5-tetrahydro-1H-[1,4]diazepino[1,7-a]indole	

== See also ==
- Azepinoindole
- Iboga alkaloid
- 5-MeO-IsoqT
- Oxa-noribogaine
- Substituted β-carboline
- Substituted 3-benzazepine
- Substituted tetrahydroisoquinoline
- Non-hallucinogenic 5-HT_{2A} receptor agonist
