= GATC-1021 =

Clinical data
- Other names: GATC1021; 8-Fluoroibogainalog
- Drug class: Serotonin receptor modulator; Serotonin 5-HT_{2A} receptor agonist
- ATC code: None

Identifiers
- IUPAC name: 8-fluoro-9-methoxy-3-methyl-1,2,3,4,5,6-hexahydroazepino[4,5-b]indole

Chemical and physical data
- Formula: C_{14}H_{17}FN_{2}O
- Molar mass: 248.301 g·mol^{−1}
- 3D model (JSmol): Interactive image
- SMILES: CN1CCC(C2=CC(OC)=C(F)C=C2N3)=C3CC1
- InChI: InChI=1S/C14H17FN2O/c1-17-5-3-9-10-7-14(18-2)11(15)8-13(10)16-12(9)4-6-17/h7-8,16H,3-6H2,1-2H3; Key:FKRSGPOSZOGYMZ-UHFFFAOYSA-N

GATC-1021, also known as 8-fluoroibogainalog, is a serotonin receptor modulator of the ibogalog family related to ibogainalog. It is the 8-fluoro derivative of ibogainalog.

The drug is known to act as a partial agonist of the serotonin 5-HT_{2A} and 5-HT_{6} receptors (E_{max} = 56% and 27%, respectively), whereas it is inactive as an agonist of the serotonin 5-HT_{2B} and 5-HT_{7} receptors. It does not affect locomotor activity and does not produce the head-twitch response, a behavioral proxy of psychedelic effects, in rodents. On the other hand, GATC-1021 has been found to reduce fentanyl self-administration in rodents. The drug produces psychoplastogenic effects in rodents. It crosses the blood–brain barrier in rodents.

The chemical synthesis of GATC-1021 has been described.

GATC-1021 was first described in the scientific literature by Valeria Lallai and colleagues in 2026. There is interest in GATC-1021 for the potential treatment of opioid use disorder and for other indications such as treatment of schizophrenia.

== See also ==
- Ibogalog
- Noribogainalog (GATC-021)
