= C13H16N2 =

The molecular formula C_{13}H_{16}N_{2} (molar mass : 200.279 g/mol) may refer to:

- Dexmedetomidine
- DM-506
- Medetomidine
- Pethidine intermediate A
- PNU-22394
- RU-27251
- RU-28306
- Tetrahydrozoline
- N-Cyclopropyltryptamine
