= C12H14N2 =

The molecular formula C_{12}H_{14}N_{2} (molar mass : 186.25 g/mol) may refer to:

- 2-Methyltryptoline
- 2MePI
- 3-AMTBI
- Altinicline
- Azepindole
- Detomidine
- N-(1-Naphthyl)ethylenediamine
- Noribogaminalog
- PNU-181731
- Tetrahydroharman
