= C18H24N2O =

The molecular formula C_{18}H_{24}N_{2}O (molar mass: 284.403 g/mol) may refer to:

- 5-MeO-IsoqT
- Azaprocin
