= Oxa-noribogaine =

Clinical data
- Other names: Oxanoribogaine; Oxa-noriboga; 16-Oxanoribogaine; Furanyl-noribogaine; 12-Hydroxy-16-oxaibogamine; 16-Oxaibogamin-12-ol
- Drug class: κ-Opioid receptor agonist

Identifiers
- IUPAC name: (1R,15S,17S)-17-ethyl-3-oxa-13-azapentacyclo[13.3.1.02,10.04,9.013,18]nonadeca-2(10),4(9),5,7-tetraen-7-ol
- PubChem CID: 171470286

Chemical and physical data
- Formula: C_{19}H_{23}NO_{2}
- Molar mass: 297.398 g·mol^{−1}
- 3D model (JSmol): Interactive image
- SMILES: CC[C@H]1C[C@H]2C[C@@H]3C1N(C2)CCC4=C3OC5=C4C=C(C=C5)O
- InChI: InChI=1S/C19H23NO2/c1-2-12-7-11-8-16-18(12)20(10-11)6-5-14-15-9-13(21)3-4-17(15)22-19(14)16/h3-4,9,11-12,16,18,21H,2,5-8,10H2,1H3/t11-,12-,16+,18?/m0/s1; Key:FZMCHQSKCBWMJA-UPHWXITMSA-N

Oxa-noribogaine is an atypical κ-opioid receptor agonist of the "oxa-iboga" family and a synthetic benzofuran analogue of noribogaine. Although it still binds to hERG with similar avidity as noribogaine, it appears to be devoid of the proarrhythmic side effects of noribogaine.

== Pharmacology ==
=== Pharmacodynamics ===
Oxa-noribogaine acts as an atypical κ-opioid receptor (KOR) partial agonist similarly to noribogaine but shows dramatically increased potency and selectivity compared to noribogaine (EC_{50} = 43 nM vs. 6,100 nM, respectively; 142-fold difference). It produces analgesic effects in animals, but unlike conventional KOR agonists, does not produce aversive or pro-depressive effects. The drug induces a robust KOR-dependent increase in GDNF levels in the ventral tegmental area (VTA) and medial prefrontal cortex (mPFC). After a single dose or short-term treatment, oxa-noribogaine induces long-lasting suppression of opioid drug-seeking behavior in rodent relapse models. It also counteracts persistent opioid-induced hyperalgesia. In addition, oxa-noribogaine decreases alcohol consumption in rodents.

== History ==
Oxa-noribogaine was first described in the scientific literature in 2015. Subsequently, it was further described in 2024.

== See also ==
- κ-Opioid receptor agonist
- Noribogaine
- Noribogainalog
- GM-3009
- 4-Allyl-6-oxa-noribogainalog
