= GM-3009 =

Clinical data
- Other names: GM3009
- Routes of administration: Unspecified
- Drug class: κ-Opioid receptor agonist

GM-3009 is a κ-opioid receptor (KOR) agonist and noribogaine analogue which is under development for the treatment of opioid-related disorders. Its route of administration is unspecified.

The drug is a highly potent agonist of the human KOR, with an affinity (K_{i}) of 0.9 nM or 87.3 nM depending on the radioligand and an EC_{50} of 0.8 nM. In contrast to noribogaine, it did not show pro-arrhythmic effects in fresh human ventricular cardiomyocytes ex vivo. GM-3009 produces antinociceptive effects and dose-dependently reduces oxycodone self-administration in rodents.

It is being developed by Gilgamesh Pharmaceuticals. As of June 2024, it is in the preclinical research stage of development. The exact chemical structure of GM-3009 does not yet appear to have been disclosed. However, it is known to be an "oxa-iboga" derivative. Oxa-ibogaine analogues have notably been patented and studied by Dalibor Sames and colleagues, with Sames being a co-founder of Gilgamesh Pharmaceuticals.

== See also ==
- κ-Opioid receptor agonist
- List of investigational hallucinogens and entactogens
- Oxa-noribogaine
- 4-Allyl-6-oxa-noribogainalog
