= 5-MeO-IsoqT =

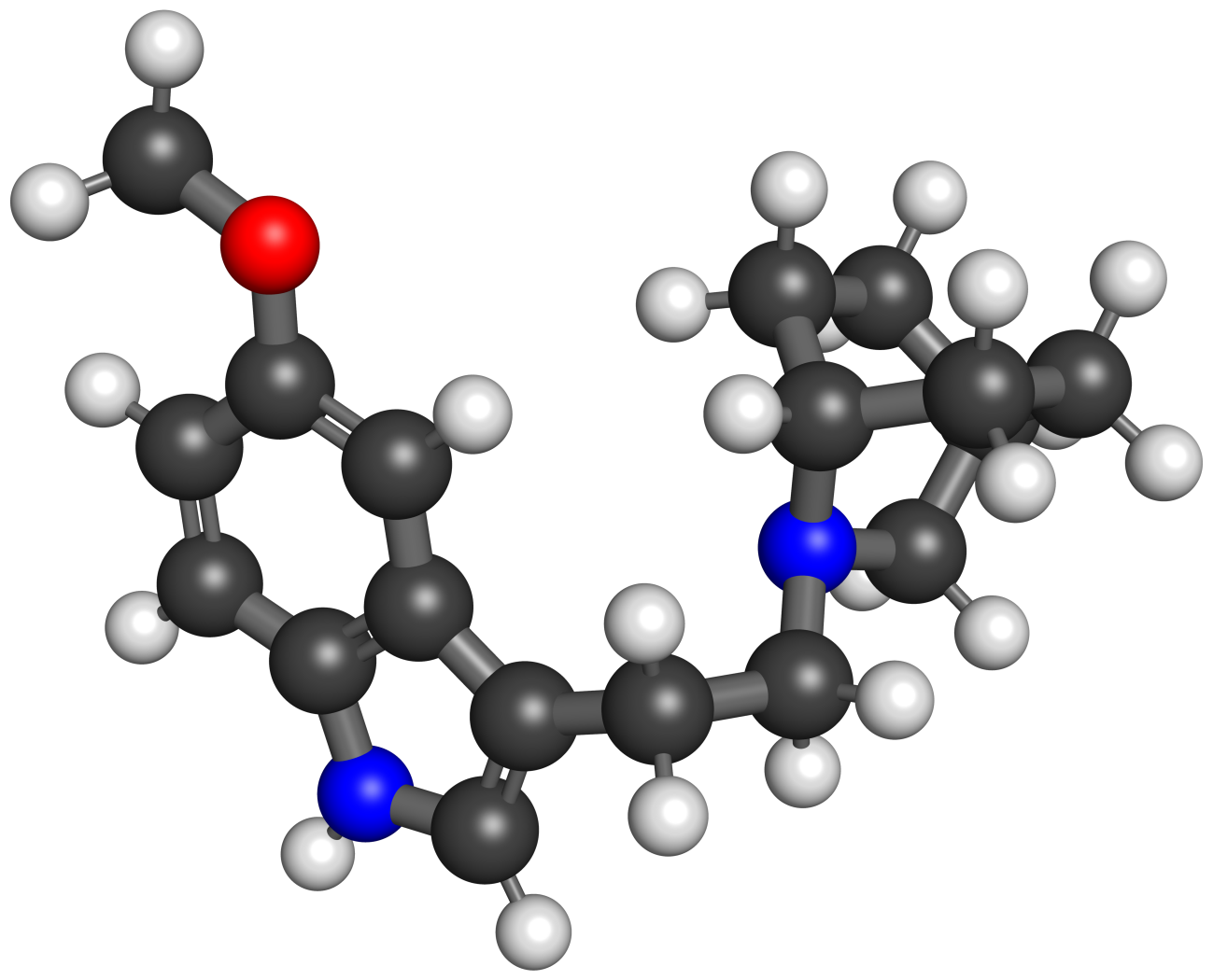

Clinical data
- Other names: 5-MeO-desethylisoquinuclidineT; Desethyl-17,18-secoibogaine
- ATC code: None

Identifiers
- IUPAC name: 3-[2-(2-azabicyclo[2.2.2]octan-2-yl)ethyl]-5-methoxy-1H-indole
- PubChem CID: 10016744
- ChemSpider: 8192317

Chemical and physical data
- Formula: C_{18}H_{24}N_{2}O
- Molar mass: 284.403 g·mol^{−1}
- 3D model (JSmol): Interactive image
- SMILES: COC1=CC2=C(C=C1)NC=C2CCN3CC4CCC3CC4
- InChI: InChI=1S/C18H24N2O/c1-21-16-6-7-18-17(10-16)14(11-19-18)8-9-20-12-13-2-4-15(20)5-3-13/h6-7,10-11,13,15,19H,2-5,8-9,12H2,1H3; Key:ACNCVCCDIUQDHS-UHFFFAOYSA-N

5-MeO-IsoqT, also known as 5-MeO-desethylisoquinuclidineT or as desethyl-17,18-secoibogaine, is a tryptamine derivative and a deconstructed and simplified analogue of ibogaine. It is a derivative of ibogaine lacking the tetrahydroazepine ring but with the isoquinuclidine ring retained. Similarly to ibogaine and noribogaine, but unlike structurally related tryptamines like 5-MeO-DMT and 5-MeO-pip-T, 5-MeO-IsoqT is said to have insignificant activity as an agonist of the serotonin 5-HT_{1A} and 5-HT_{2A} receptors. 5-MeO-IsoqT was described in the scientific literature by Dalibor Sames and colleagues in 2024. Other closely related isoquinuclidine-tryptamines have also been described by David E. Olson and colleagues in 2021, for instance the ethyl-conserved 5-hydroxy and 5-methoxy analogues.

== See also ==
- Cyclized tryptamine
- Ibogalog
- Desethylibogamine
