= Catharanthalog =

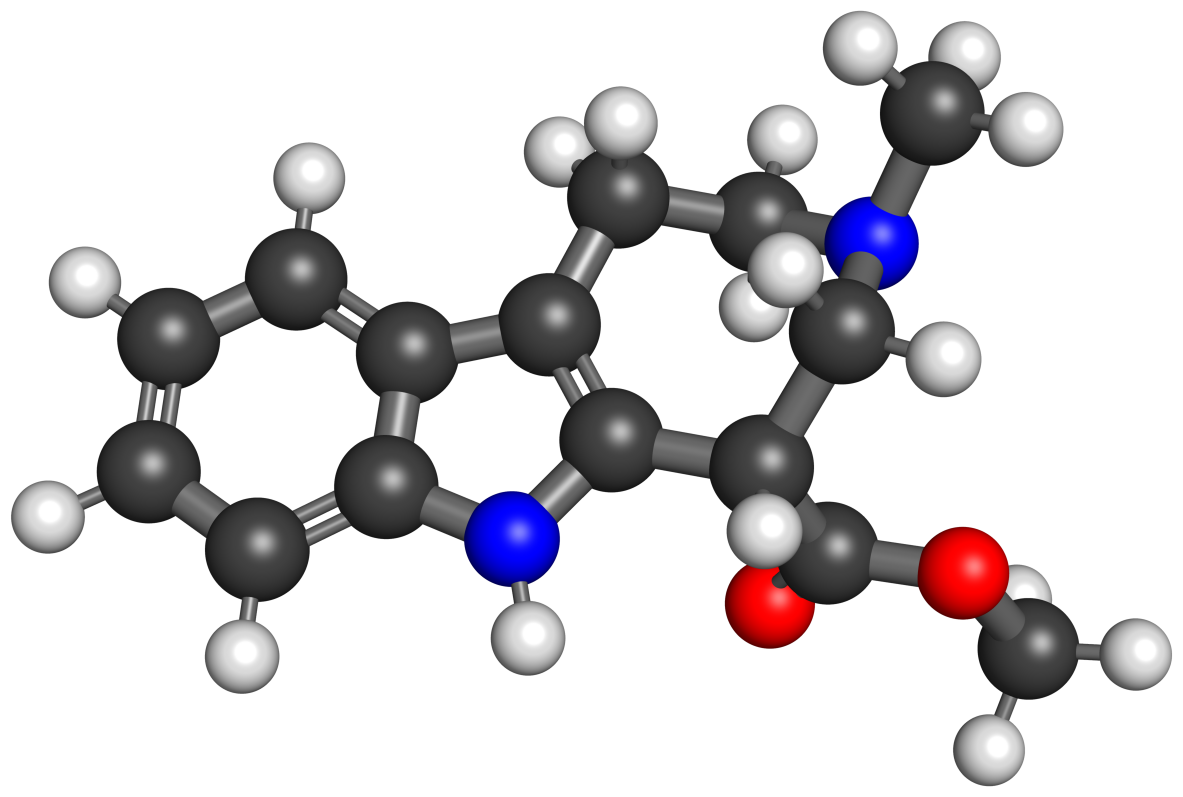

Clinical data
- Other names: CAG
- Drug class: Non-hallucinogenic serotonin 5-HT_{2A} receptor partial agonist
- ATC code: None

Identifiers
- IUPAC name: methyl 3-methyl-2,4,5,6-tetrahydro-1H-azepino[4,5-b]indole-5-carboxylate
- CAS Number: 2973762-95-5
- PubChem CID: 20642897

Chemical and physical data
- Formula: C_{15}H_{18}N_{2}O_{2}
- Molar mass: 258.321 g·mol^{−1}
- 3D model (JSmol): Interactive image
- SMILES: CN1CCC2=C(C(C1)C(=O)OC)NC3=CC=CC=C23
- InChI: InChI=1S/C15H18N2O2/c1-17-8-7-11-10-5-3-4-6-13(10)16-14(11)12(9-17)15(18)19-2/h3-6,12,16H,7-9H2,1-2H3; Key:BYQISFIBSIGMLV-UHFFFAOYSA-N

Catharanthalog (CAG) is a non-hallucinogenic serotonin receptor modulator of the ibogalog group related to the iboga alkaloid catharanthine but with a simplified chemical structure. It is known to act as a serotonin 5-HT_{2A} receptor partial agonist. The drug produces analgesic-like effects in a neuropathic pain model in rodents that can be reduced by the serotonin 5-HT_{2A} receptor antagonist ketanserin. Catharanthalog is said to have relatively low blood–brain barrier permeability owing to relatively low lipophilicity. It does not produce the head-twitch response, a behavioral proxy of psychedelic effects, in rodents. The drug was first described in the scientific literature by 2025.

== See also ==
- Ibogalog
- Catharanthine
- Ibogainalog
- Ibogaminalog
- Noribogainalog
- PNU-22394
- Tabernanthalog
