= 4-Allyl-6-oxa-noribogainalog =

Clinical data
- Other names: 4-Allyl-6-oxanoribogainalog; 4-Allyloxa-noribogainalog; "Compound 23"
- Drug class: κ-Opioid receptor agonist
- ATC code: None

Identifiers
- IUPAC name: 3-methyl-4-prop-2-enyl-1,2,4,5-tetrahydro-[1]benzofuro[2,3-d]azepin-9-ol
- PubChem CID: 177206928

Chemical and physical data
- Formula: C_{16}H_{19}NO_{2}
- Molar mass: 257.333 g·mol^{−1}
- 3D model (JSmol): Interactive image
- SMILES: CN1CCC2=C(CC1CC=C)OC3=C2C=C(C=C3)O
- InChI: InChI=1S/C16H19NO2/c1-3-4-11-9-16-13(7-8-17(11)2)14-10-12(18)5-6-15(14)19-16/h3,5-6,10-11,18H,1,4,7-9H2,2H3; Key:JNHYXOGJXDHIOU-UHFFFAOYSA-N

4-Allyl-6-oxa-noribogainalog is a κ-opioid receptor (KOR) agonist of the oxa-ibogalog family related to oxa-noribogaine. It is a highly potent full agonist of the KOR, with an EC_{50} of 1 nM and an E_{max} of 103% in a G protein BRET assay. This is dramatically more potent than oxa-noribogaine or noribogaine at the KOR in the same assay per another study by the same group (EC_{50} (E_{max}) = 43 nM (82%) and 6,100 nM (52%), respectively). The drug shows considerable selectivity for activation of the KOR over activation of the μ- and δ-opioid receptors. 4-Allyl-6-oxa-noribogainalog was the most potent KOR agonist in a series of oxa-ibogalog compounds. It was patented by Dalibor Sames and colleagues in 2025, with Sames being a co-founder of Gilgamesh Pharmaceuticals.

== See also ==
- κ-Opioid receptor agonist
- Ibogalog § Related compounds
- List of investigational hallucinogens and entactogens
- GM-3009
