= Desethylibogamine =

Names
- IUPAC name (6R,6aS,9R)-6,6a,7,8,9,10,12,13-Octahydro-5H-6,9-methanopyrido[1′,2′:1,2]azepino[4,5-b]indole
- Other names 4-Desethylibogamine; 4-Deethylibogamine; Noribogamine

Identifiers
3D model (JSmol)	Interactive image
- InChI: InChI=1S/C17H20N2/c1-2-4-15-12(3-1)13-7-8-19-10-11-5-6-16(19)14(9-11)17(13)18-15/h1-4,11,14,16,18H,5-10H2/t11-,14-,16+/m1/s1 Key: HWGBLBYCKKHAOB-XFJVYGCCSA-N
- SMILES: c1ccc2c(c1)[nH]c1c2CCN2[C@@H]3[C@H]1C[C@H](C2)CC3

Properties
Chemical formula	C_{17}H_{20}N_{2}
Molar mass	252.361 g·mol^{−1}
- Except where otherwise noted, data are given for materials in their standard state (at 25 °C [77 °F], 100 kPa). Infobox references

Desethylibogamine, or 4-desethylibogamine, also known as noribogamine, is a chemical compound and parent structure of the iboga-type alkaloids such as ibogaine and ibogamine. It is the 4-desethyl analogue of ibogamine and features the ibogaine ring system with no other substitutions. The total synthesis of desethylibogamine was described in the mid-1960s.

== See also ==
- Iboga-type alkaloid
- Noribogaminalog
- Azepinoindole (ibogalog)
- 5-MeO-IsoqT
