= Noribogainalog =

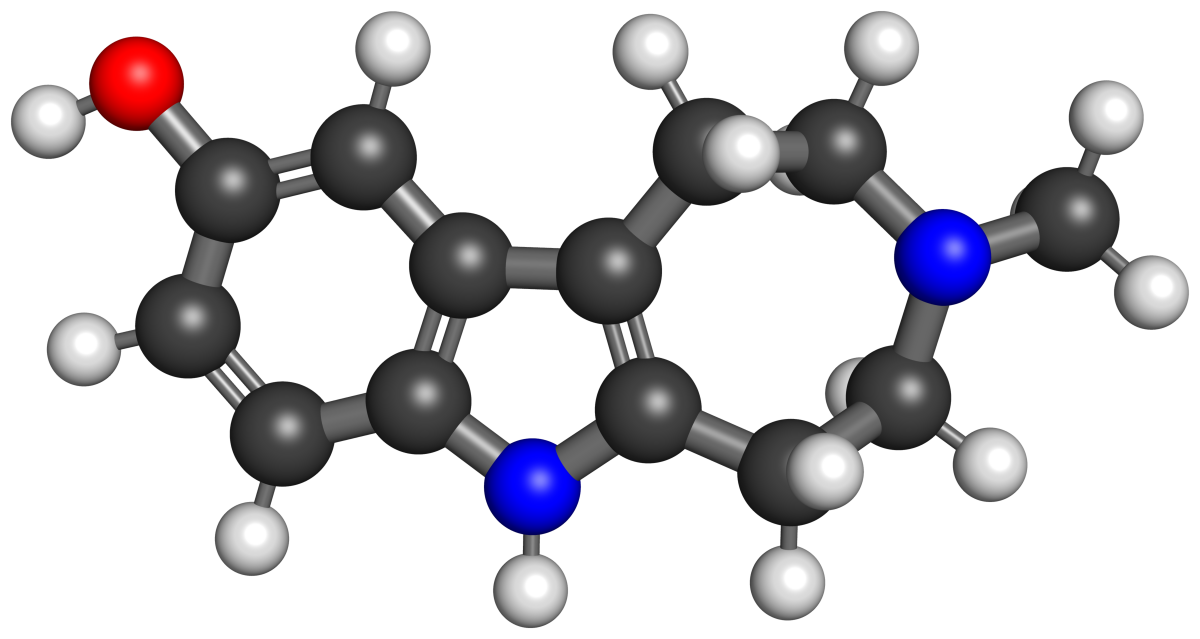

Clinical data
- Other names: Nor-IBG; 9-Hydroxyibogaminalog; GATC-021; GATC021
- Drug class: Serotonin receptor modulator; Serotonin 5-HT_{2A} receptor agonist
- ATC code: None

Identifiers
- IUPAC name: 3-methyl-2,4,5,6-tetrahydro-1H-azepino[4,5-b]indol-9-ol
- CAS Number: 411220-25-2
- PubChem CID: 154694300
- ChemSpider: 74888746

Chemical and physical data
- Formula: C_{13}H_{16}N_{2}O
- Molar mass: 216.284 g·mol^{−1}
- 3D model (JSmol): Interactive image
- SMILES: CN1CCC2=C(CC1)NC3=C2C=C(C=C3)O
- InChI: InChI=1S/C13H16N2O/c1-15-6-4-10-11-8-9(16)2-3-12(11)14-13(10)5-7-15/h2-3,8,14,16H,4-7H2,1H3; Key:OOROJSRWMMKEQK-UHFFFAOYSA-N

Noribogainalog (nor-IBG), also known as 9-hydroxyibogaminalog or as GATC-021, is a drug of the ibogalog family related to noribogaine. It is a simplified analogue of noribogaine.

== Pharmacology ==
=== Pharmacodynamics ===
Noribogainalog acts as a potent serotonin 5-HT_{2A} receptor partial agonist (EC_{50} ≈ 90 nM; E_{max} = 35–45%). It is also a partial agonist of the serotonin 5-HT_{6} receptor (E_{max} = 29%), whereas it is not an agonist of the serotonin 5-HT_{2B} and 5-HT_{7} receptors. The drug additionally has activity as a dopamine transporter (DAT) chaperone.

Noribogainalog does not affect locomotor activity, does not produce the head-twitch response, and does not affect various other physiological and behavioral measures. However, it does produce analgesic effects that can be diminished by the serotonin 5-HT_{2A} receptor antagonist ketanserin. In addition, a subsequent study found that the highest assessed dose produced significant hypolocomotion and that the drug also reduced fentanyl self-administration.

=== Pharmacokinetics ===
Noribogainalog shows relatively low expected blood–brain barrier permeability.

== Chemistry ==
=== Synthesis ===
The chemical synthesis of noribogainalog has been described.

=== Analogues ===
Analogues of noribogainalog include catharanthalog, ibogainalog, ibogaminalog, PNU-22394, tabernanthalog, 4-allyl-6-oxa-noribogainalog, and noribogaine, among others.

== History ==
Noribogainalog was first described in the scientific literature by David E. Olson and colleagues by 2021.

== See also ==
- Ibogalog
