= Tabernanthalog =

- Molecular structure of tabernanthalog

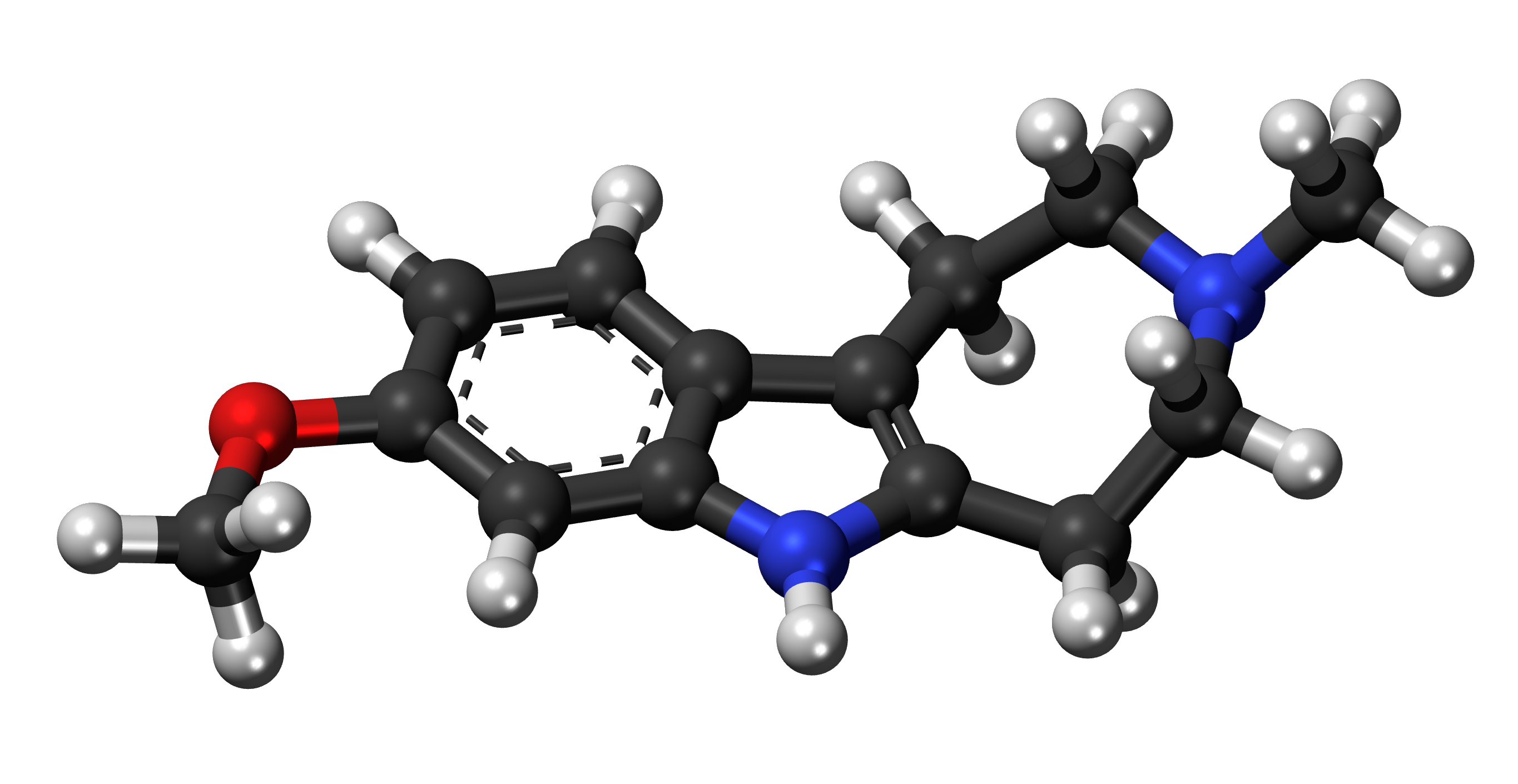
- 3D representation of a tabernathalog molecule

Clinical data
- Other names: TBG; DLX-007; DLX007
- Routes of administration: Oral
- Drug class: Non-selective serotonin receptor modulator; Non-hallucinogenic serotonin 5-HT_{2A} receptor partial agonist
- ATC code: None

Identifiers
- IUPAC name: 8-methoxy-3-methyl-2,4,5,6-tetrahydro-1H-azepino[4,5-b]indole
- CAS Number: 2483829-59-8
- PubChem CID: 146026994
- ChemSpider: 114959868
- CompTox Dashboard (EPA): DTXSID301336754

Chemical and physical data
- Formula: C_{14}H_{18}N_{2}O
- Molar mass: 230.311 g·mol^{−1}
- 3D model (JSmol): Interactive image
- SMILES: CN1CCC2=C(CC1)NC3=C2C=CC(=C3)OC
- InChI: InChI=1S/C14H18N2O/c1-16-7-5-12-11-4-3-10(17-2)9-14(11)15-13(12)6-8-16/h3-4,9,15H,5-8H2,1-2H3; Key:FNGNYGCPNKZYOG-UHFFFAOYSA-N

Tabernanthalog (TBG; developmental code name DLX-007) is a non-selective serotonin receptor modulator and putatively non-psychedelic psychoplastogen of the ibogalog group related to the iboga alkaloid tabernanthine but with a simplified chemical structure. It was developed by David E. Olson and colleagues at the University of California, Davis. The drug is being developed by Delix Therapeutics as a potential pharmaceutical drug for treatment of neuropsychiatric disorders. However, as of January 2026, tabernanthalog has still yet to enter clinical trials.

== Use and effects ==
There have been informal anecdotal reports of the effects of tabernanthalog.

== Pharmacology ==
=== Pharmacodynamics ===
Tabernanthalog activities
| Target | Affinity (K_{i}, nM) |
|---|---|
| 5-HT_{1A} | 39% BI @ 10 μM; 14,600 (EC_{50}); 95% (E_{max}) |
| 5-HT_{1B} | 66% BI @ 10 μM; 34 (EC_{50}); 87% (E_{max}) |
| 5-HT_{1D} | ND (K_{i}); 2,180 (EC_{50}); 76% (E_{max}) |
| 5-HT_{1E} | ND (K_{i}); 2,784 (EC_{50}); 117% (E_{max}) |
| 5-HT_{1F} | ND (K_{i}); 40 (EC_{50}); 64% (E_{max}) |
| 5-HT_{2A} | 4,440 (K_{i}); 57% BI @ 10 μM; 147–4,570 (EC_{50}); 8–91% (E_{max}) |
| 5-HT_{2B} | 439 (K_{i}); 86% BI @ 10 μM; 2,827 or IA (EC_{50}); 46% or IA (E_{max}) |
| 5-HT_{2C} | 28,590 (K_{i}); 99% BI @ 10 μM; 13–69 (EC_{50}); 21–99% (E_{max}) |
| 5-HT_{3} | 14% BI @ 10 μM |
| 5-HT_{4} | ND (K_{i}) >10,000 (EC_{50}) |
| 5-HT_{5A} | ND (K_{i}) >10,000 (EC_{50}) |
| 5-HT_{6} | ND (K_{i}); 132–214 (EC_{50}); 88–133% (E_{max}) |
| 5-HT_{7} | ND (K_{i}) >10,000 (EC_{50}) |
| α_{1A}–α_{1D} | 15–20% BI @ 10 μM |
| α_{2A} | 81% BI @ 10 μM |
| α_{2B} | 27% BI @ 10 μM |
| α_{2C} | ND |
| β_{1}–β_{2} | 9% BI @ 10 μM |
| D_{1}, D_{2} | 3–18% BI @ 10 μM |
| D_{3}–D_{5} | ND |
| H_{1} | 35% BI @ 10 μM |
| H_{2} | –12% BI @ 10 μM |
| H_{3}, H_{4} | ND |
| M_{1}–M_{4} | 2–18% BI @ 10 μM |
| M_{5} | ND |
| nACh | 16–19% BI @ 10 μM |
| I_{1}, I_{2} | ND |
| σ_{1}, σ_{2} | ND |
| MOR | 17% BI @ 10 μM; IA (EC_{50}) |
| DOR | 14% BI @ 10 μM; IA (EC_{50}) |
| KOR | 7% BI @ 10 μM >10,000 (EC_{50}) |
| NMDAR | 0–3% BI @ 10 μM (rat) |
| TAAR1 | ND |
| SERT | 88% BI @ 10 μM; 600 (IC_{50}) |
| NET | ND (K_{i}); 5,400 (IC_{50}) |
| DAT | ND (K_{i}); 65,000 (IC_{50}) |
| VMAT | 10% BI @ 10 μM |
| MAO-A | 66% BI @ 10 μM; 15,100 (IC_{50}) |
| MAO-B | 16% BI @ 10 μM; 28% FI @ 100 μM |
Notes: The smaller the value, the more avidly the drug binds to the site. All proteins are human unless otherwise specified. Refs:

Tabernanthalog is a non-selective and non-psychedelic serotonin receptor modulator, including acting as an agonist of the serotonin 5-HT_{1B}, 5-HT_{1F}, 5-HT_{2A}, 5-HT_{2C}, and 5-HT_{6} receptors and as an agonist or antagonist of the serotonin 5-HT_{2B} receptor. It also shows significant binding to the serotonin transporter (SERT) (acting as a serotonin reuptake inhibitor), the α_{2A}-adrenergic receptor, and monoamine oxidase A (MAO-A). In contrast to iboga alkaloids like ibogaine and noribogaine, tabernanthalog showed negligible interactions with opioid receptors, the NMDA receptor, and certain nicotinic acetylcholine receptors. However, in subsequent research, it weakly inhibited certain nicotinic acetylcholine receptors, as well as, to a much lesser extent, the GABA_{A} receptor. Tabernanthalog was found to be 100-fold less potent at the hERG antitarget compared to ibogaine, and hence is thought to have a much lower potential for cardiotoxicity.

Tabernanthalog did not produce the head-twitch response, a behavioral proxy of psychedelic effects, in rodents, and hence appears to be non-hallucinogenic. However, it was found to promote structural neuroplasticity (i.e., to act as a psychoplastogen), reduce drug-seeking behavior, and produce antidepressant-like effects. It has also been shown that it reduces motivation for heroin and alcohol in rodents.

== History ==
Tabernanthalog was first described in the scientific literature by David E. Olson and colleagues at the University of California, Davis in January 2021.

== Society and culture ==
=== Grey market use ===
Tabernanthalog has been known to be sold online by research chemical vendors for purposes such as "nootropic" use.

=== Legal status ===
==== Canada ====
Tabernanthalog is not a controlled substance in Canada.

==== United States ====
Tabernanthalog is not an explicitly controlled substance in the United States.

== Research ==
Tabernanthalog is under development for the treatment of central nervous system disorders (CNS disorders). It is being developed by Delix Therapeutics. As of May 2025, no recent development has been reported. It had reached the preclinical research stage of development. A phase 1 clinical trial was being planned for the first half of 2023. Delix Therapeutics also partnered with National Institute on Drug Abuse (NIDA) to evaluate tabernanthalog for the treatment of substance-related disorders in December 2021. As of January 2026, tabernanthalog has still yet to enter clinical trials.

== See also ==
- Ibogalog
- Non-hallucinogenic 5-HT_{2A} receptor agonist
- List of investigational hallucinogens and entactogens
- Tabernanthine
- Catharanthalog
- DLX-159
- Ibogainalog
- Ibogaminalog (DM-506)
- Noribogainalog
- PNU-22394
