= PHA-57378 =

Chemical compound

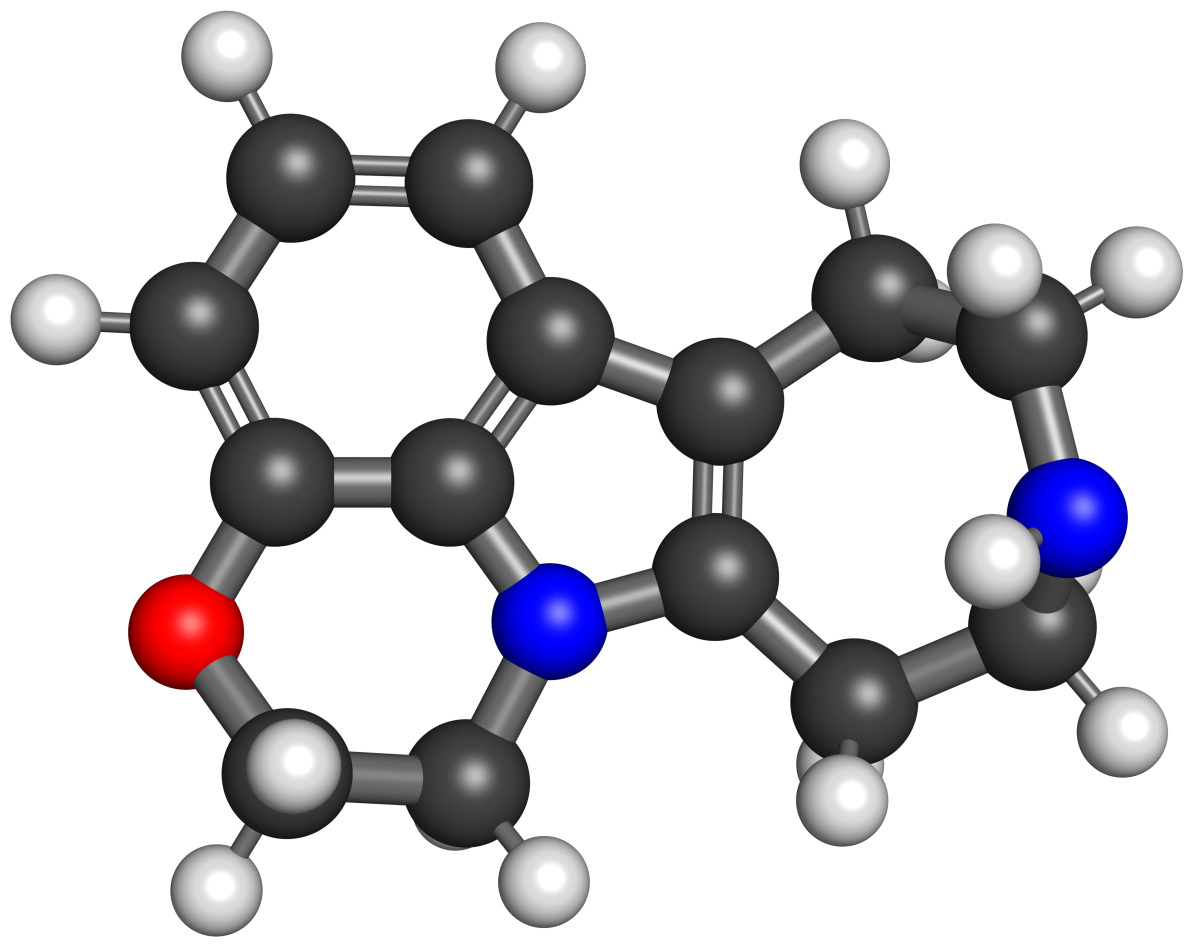

Identifiers
- IUPAC name: 2,7,8,9,10,11-hexahydro-1H-azepino[4,5-b][1,4]oxazino[2,3,4-hi]indole
- CAS Number: 303798-94-9
- PubChem CID: 10198481
- ChemSpider: 8373981

Chemical and physical data
- Formula: C_{14}H_{16}N_{2}O
- Molar mass: 228.295 g·mol^{−1}
- 3D model (JSmol): Interactive image
- SMILES: C1(OCC2)=C(N2C3=C4CCNCC3)C4=CC=C1
- InChI: InChI=1S/C14H16N2O/c1-2-11-10-4-6-15-7-5-12(10)16-8-9-17-13(3-1)14(11)16/h1-3,15H,4-9H2; Key:KMVAXNRPZRSLSY-UHFFFAOYSA-N

PHA-57378 is a drug related to the ibogalogs which acts as an agonist at serotonin 5-HT_{2} receptors, having a binding affinity of 4.1 nM at the 5-HT_{2A} subtype and 4.3 nM at 5-HT_{2C}. It has anxiolytic effects in animal studies.

== See also ==
- Ibogalog
- PNU-22394
- PNU-181731
- WAY-470
