= Ibogainalog =

Serotonergic psychedelic

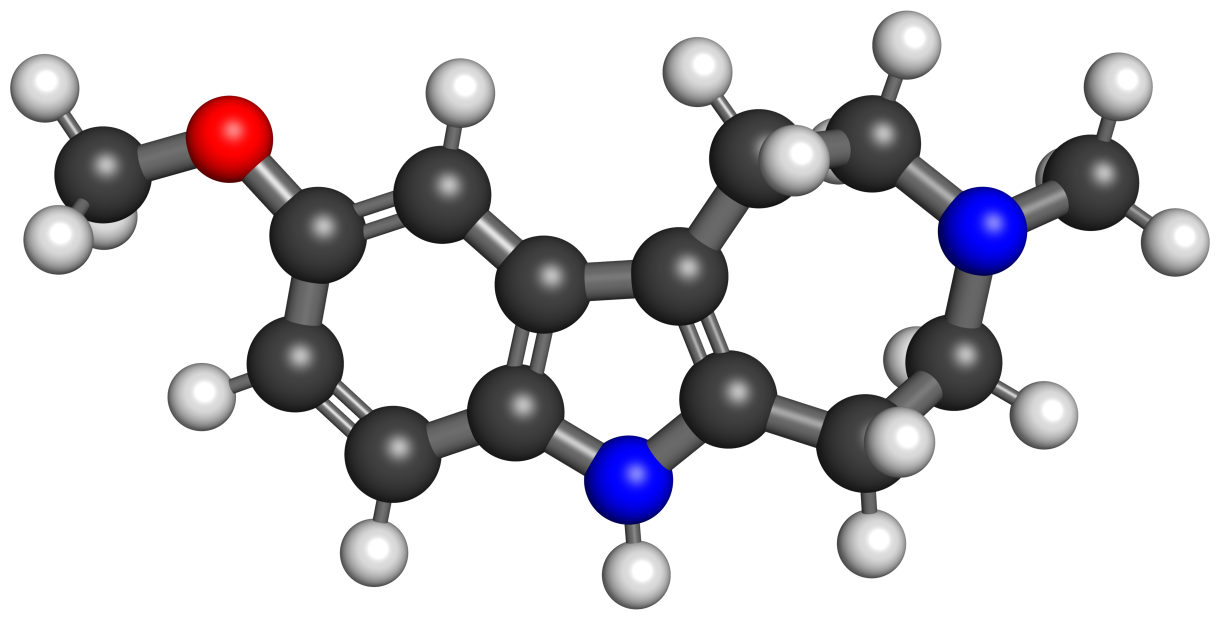

Clinical data
- Other names: IBG; 9-Methoxyibogaminalog; 9-MeO-ibogaminalog
- Drug class: Non-selective serotonin receptor modulator; Serotonin 5-HT_{2A} receptor agonist; Serotonergic psychedelic; Hallucinogen; Psychoplastogen

Identifiers
- IUPAC name: 9-methoxy-3-methyl-2,4,5,6-tetrahydro-1H-azepino[4,5-b]indole
- CAS Number: 802581-10-8
- PubChem CID: 370423
- ChemSpider: 328813
- ChEMBL: ChEMBL2009371

Chemical and physical data
- Formula: C_{14}H_{18}N_{2}O
- Molar mass: 230.311 g·mol^{−1}
- 3D model (JSmol): Interactive image
- SMILES: CN1CCC2=C(CC1)NC3=C2C=C(C=C3)OC
- InChI: InChI=1S/C14H18N2O/c1-16-7-5-11-12-9-10(17-2)3-4-13(12)15-14(11)6-8-16/h3-4,9,15H,5-8H2,1-2H3; Key:RVVJOBLZASPMDJ-UHFFFAOYSA-N

Ibogainalog (IBG), also known as 9-methoxyibogaminalog, is a non-selective serotonin receptor modulator, serotonergic psychedelic, and psychoplastogen of the ibogalog group related to the iboga alkaloid ibogaine but with a simplified chemical structure.

== Pharmacology ==
=== Pharmacodynamics ===
Ibogainalog activities
Target	Affinity (K_{i}, nM)
5-HT_{1A}	ND (K_{i}); 6,911 (EC_{50}); 91% (E_{max})
5-HT_{1B}	ND (K_{i}); 170 (EC_{50}); 76% (E_{max})
5-HT_{1D}	ND (K_{i}); 6,043 (EC_{50}); 82% (E_{max})
5-HT_{1E}	ND (K_{i}); 9,309 (EC_{50}); 126% (E_{max})
5-HT_{1F}	ND (K_{i}); 35 (EC_{50}); 85% (E_{max})
5-HT_{2A}	670 (K_{i}); 18–85 (EC_{50}); 55–93% (E_{max})
5-HT_{2B}	169 (K_{i}); 11,130 or IA (EC_{50}); 58% or IA (E_{max})
5-HT_{2C}	810 (K_{i}); 4.0–19 (EC_{50}); 13–97% (E_{max})
5-HT_{3}	ND
5-HT_{4}	ND (K_{i}) >10,000 (EC_{50})
5-HT_{5A}	ND (K_{i}) >10,000 (EC_{50})
5-HT_{6}	ND (K_{i}); 7.1–8.8 (EC_{50}); 83–99% (E_{max})
5-HT_{7}	ND (K_{i}); 335 (EC_{50}) –17% (E_{max})
α_{1A}–α_{1D}	ND
α_{2A}–α_{2C}	ND
β_{1}–β_{3}	ND
D_{1}–D_{5}	ND
H_{1}–H_{4}	ND
M_{1}–M_{5}	ND
nACh	ND
I_{1}, I_{2}	ND
σ_{1}, σ_{2}	ND
MOR	ND (K_{i}); IA (EC_{50})
DOR	ND (K_{i}); IA (EC_{50})
KOR	ND (K_{i}) >10,000 (EC_{50})
NMDAR	ND
TAAR1	ND
SERT	ND (K_{i}); 400 (IC_{50})
NET	ND (K_{i}); 20,000 (IC_{50})
DAT	ND (K_{i}); 246,000 (IC_{50})
MAO-A	39% FI @ 100 μM
MAO-B	0% FI @ 100 μM
Notes: The smaller the value, the more avidly the drug binds to the site. All proteins are human unless otherwise specified. Refs:

Ibogainalog acts as a non-selective serotonin receptor modulator, including as an agonist of the serotonin 5-HT_{1B}, 5-HT_{1F}, 5-HT_{2A}, and 5-HT_{6} receptors, as an agonist or antagonist of the serotonin 5-HT_{2B} and 5-HT_{2C} receptors, and as an inverse agonist of the serotonin 5-HT_{7} receptor. Unlike noribogaine, IBG shows no activation of the opioid receptors or κ-opioid receptor agonism. In addition to its actions at serotonin receptors, IBG weakly inhibits certain nicotinic acetylcholine receptors. The drug also acts as a relatively weak serotonin reuptake inhibitor.

The drug produces the head-twitch response in animals and hence shows psychedelic-like effects. However, it has reduced and relatively weak hallucinogen-like effects compared to 5-MeO-DMT. Conversely, tabernanthalog (TBG), a simplified analogue of tabernanthine and positional isomer of IBG, appears to be completely non-hallucinogenic. IBG shows comparable psychoplastogenic activity to ibogaine. In contrast to ibogaine, IBG and TBG appear to have much less or no potential for cardiotoxicity secondary to hERG inhibition. However, TBG showed a better overall safety profile than IBG and was selected for development instead of IBG. IBG shows analgesic effects against neuropathic pain and visceral pain in animals that appear to be mediated by serotonin 5-HT_{2A} receptor activation.

In early animal studies, ibogainalog was described as having enhanced tryptamine-like, tremorogenic, and sedative effects compared to ibogaine. It was also said to have chlorpromazine-like effects.

== Chemistry ==
IBG can be viewed as a conformationally restricted analogue of 5-MeO-DMT, whereas TBG can be viewed as a conformationally restricted analogue of 6-MeO-DMT. Owing to their simplified structures, the chemical syntheses of IBG and TBG are much more practical than the synthesis of ibogaine.

== History ==
Ibogainalog was first described in the scientific literature by 1968. Subsequently, it was studied and described in greater detail by David E. Olson and colleagues in the 2020s.

== Society and culture ==
=== Legal status ===
==== Canada ====
Ibogainalog is not an explicitly nor implicitly controlled substance in Canada as of 2025.

==== United States ====
Ibogainalog is not an explicitly controlled substance in the United States. However, it could be considered a controlled substance under the Federal Analogue Act if intended for human consumption.

== See also ==
- Ibogalog
- Ibogaine
- Catharanthalog
- Ibogaminalog (DM-506)
- Noribogainalog
- PNU-22394
- Tabernanthalog (DLX-007)
