= PNU-181731 =

Chemical compound

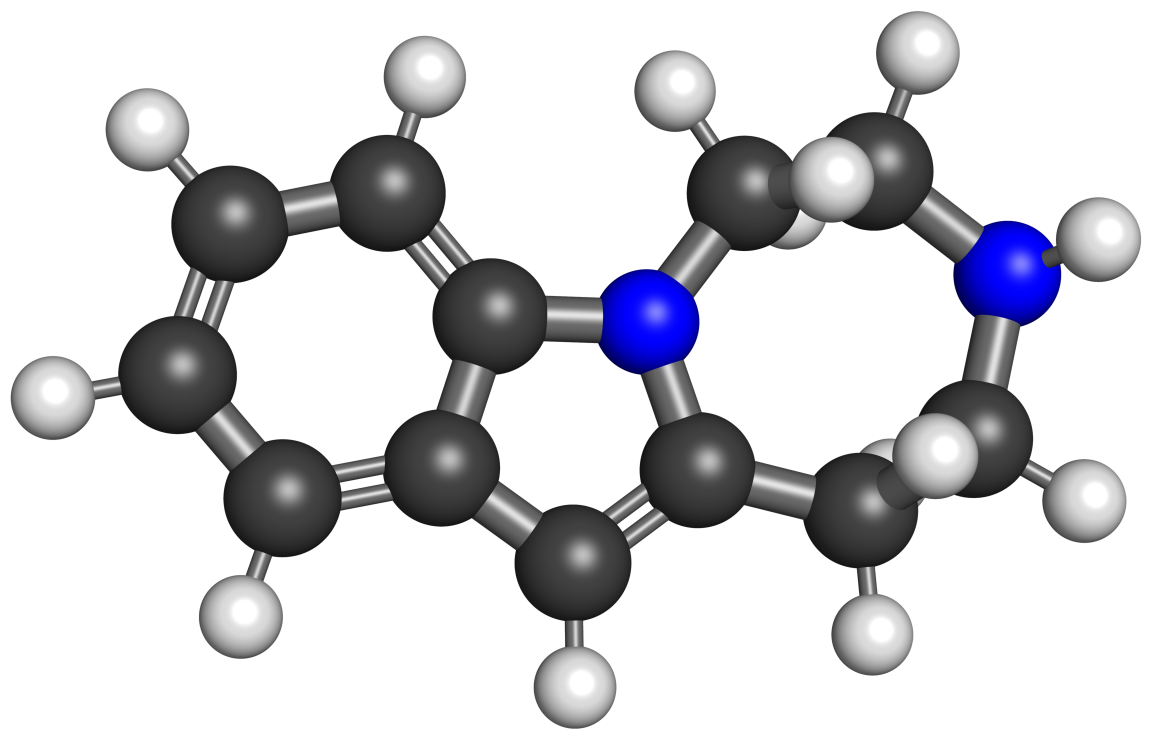

Clinical data
- Other names: PNU181731

Identifiers
- IUPAC name: 2,3,4,5-tetrahydro-1H-[1,4]diazepino[1,7-a]indole
- CAS Number: 364344-56-9
- PubChem CID: 9794092
- ChemSpider: 7969859
- UNII: UVL6VJD7YC
- CompTox Dashboard (EPA): DTXSID201045564

Chemical and physical data
- Formula: C_{12}H_{14}N_{2}
- Molar mass: 186.258 g·mol^{−1}
- 3D model (JSmol): Interactive image
- SMILES: C12=CC=CC=C1N3C(CCNCC3)=C2
- InChI: InChI=1S/C12H14N2/c1-2-4-12-10(3-1)9-11-5-6-13-7-8-14(11)12/h1-4,9,13H,5-8H2; Key:XORPZYQOYUSNCQ-UHFFFAOYSA-N

PNU-181731 is a drug which acts as an agonist at serotonin 5-HT_{2} receptors, with strongest binding affinity for the 5-HT_{2C} subtype at 4.8nM, and weaker 5-HT_{2A} affinity of 18nM. It has anxiolytic effects in animal studies with around one tenth the potency of alprazolam and no significant ataxia or other side effects noted. It is a cyclized isotryptamine related to the ibogalogs.

== See also ==
- Ibogalog
- Substituted isotryptamine
- Lorcaserin
- PNU-22394
- PHA-57378
