= Azepine =

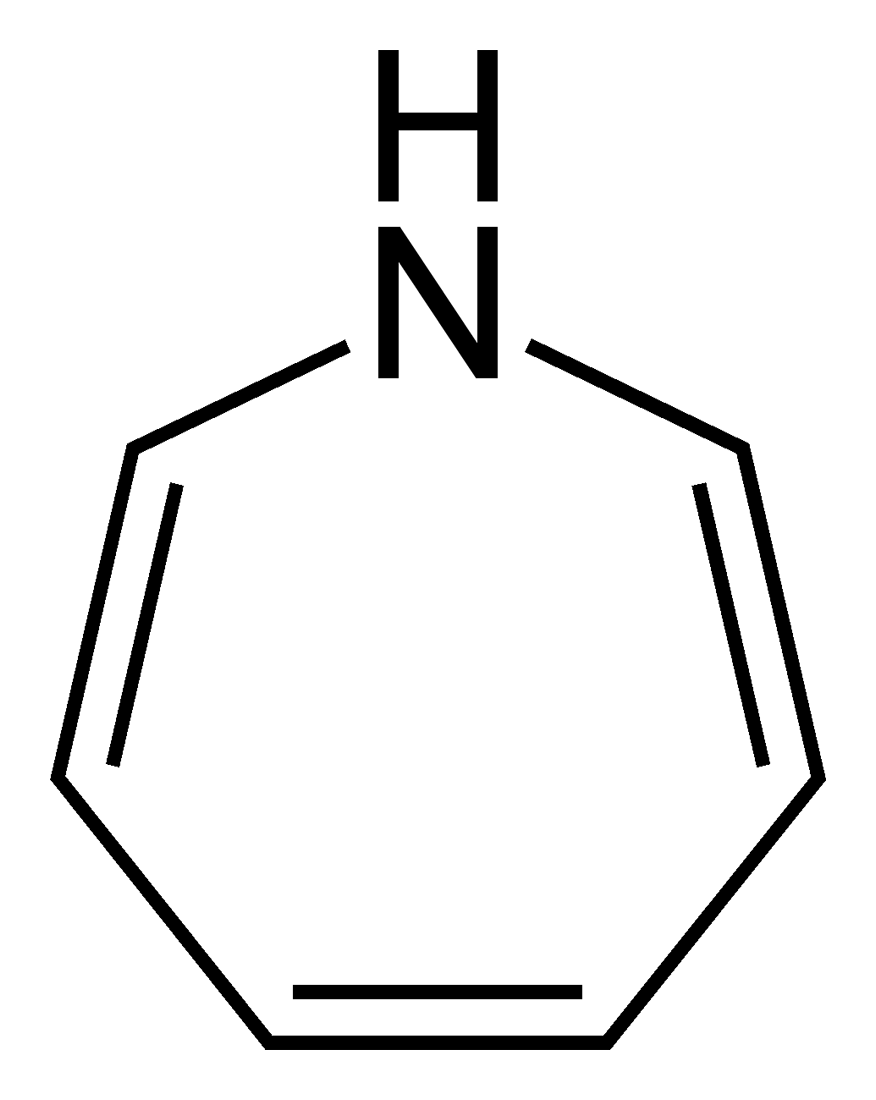

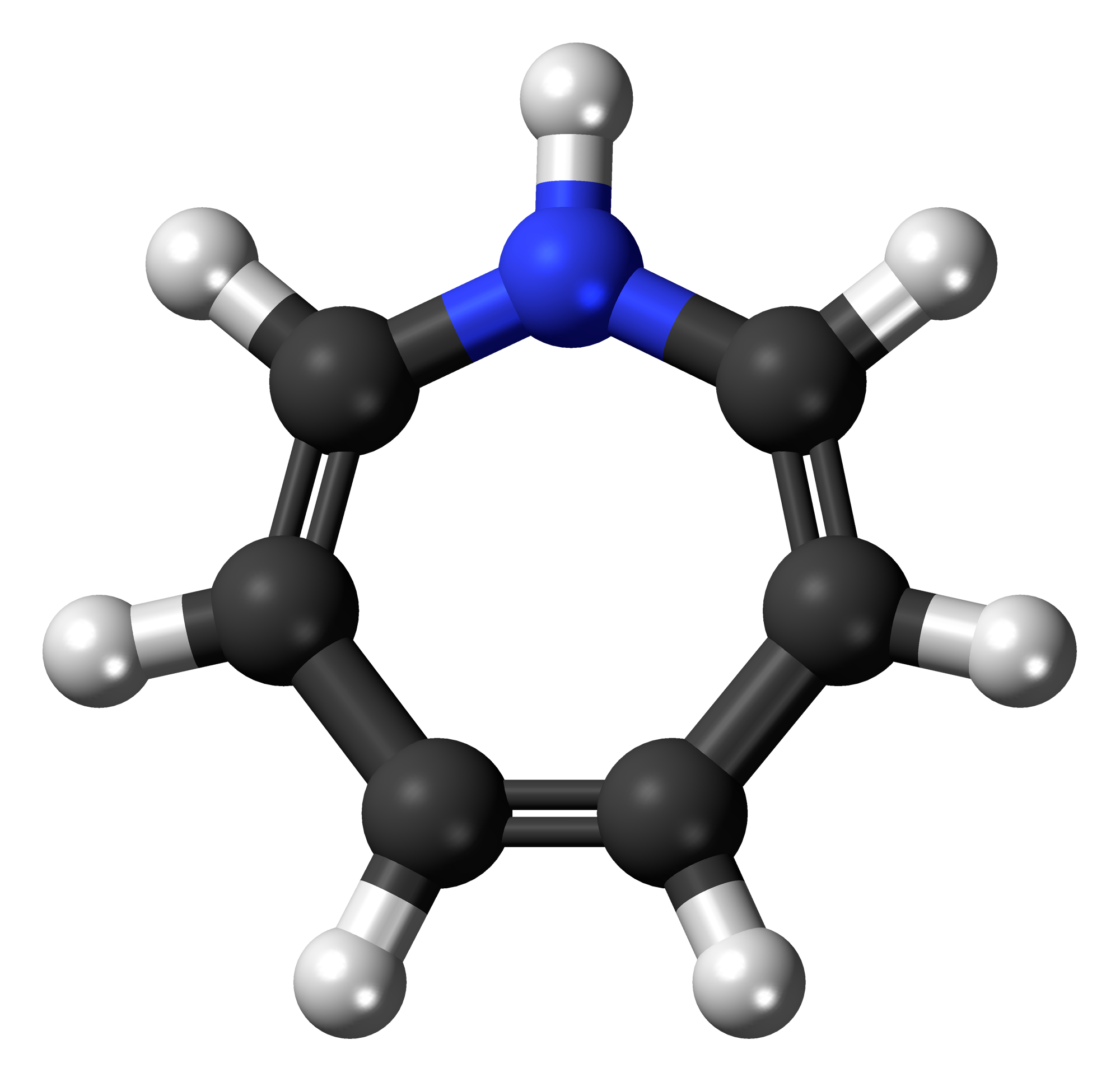

Names
- IUPAC name 1H-Azepine
- Other names Azacycloheptatriene

Identifiers
CAS Number	291-69-0
3D model (JSmol)	Interactive image
ChemSpider	4953941
PubChem CID	6451476
UNII	8324797PB4
CompTox Dashboard (EPA)	DTXSID50183352
- InChI: InChI=1S/C6H7N/c1-2-4-6-7-5-3-1/h1-7H Key: XYOVOXDWRFGKEX-UHFFFAOYSA-N; InChI=1/C6H7N/c1-2-4-6-7-5-3-1/h1-7H Key: XYOVOXDWRFGKEX-UHFFFAOYAM
- SMILES: C1=CC=CNC=C1

Properties
Chemical formula	C_{6}H_{7}N
Molar mass	93.129 g·mol^{−1}
- Except where otherwise noted, data are given for materials in their standard state (at 25 °C [77 °F], 100 kPa). verify (what is ?) Infobox references

Azepine is an unsaturated heterocycle of seven atoms, with a nitrogen replacing a carbon at one position.

The atoms are numbered starting with the nitrogen. The 1H-azepine isomer shown above is an unstable red oil at -78°C and rearranges on contact with acid or base to 3H-azepine with two hydrogen atoms attached to the third carbon.

== See also ==
- Azepane
- Benzazepines
- Diazepine
- Oxepin
- Borepin
