= PNU-22394 =

Chemical compound

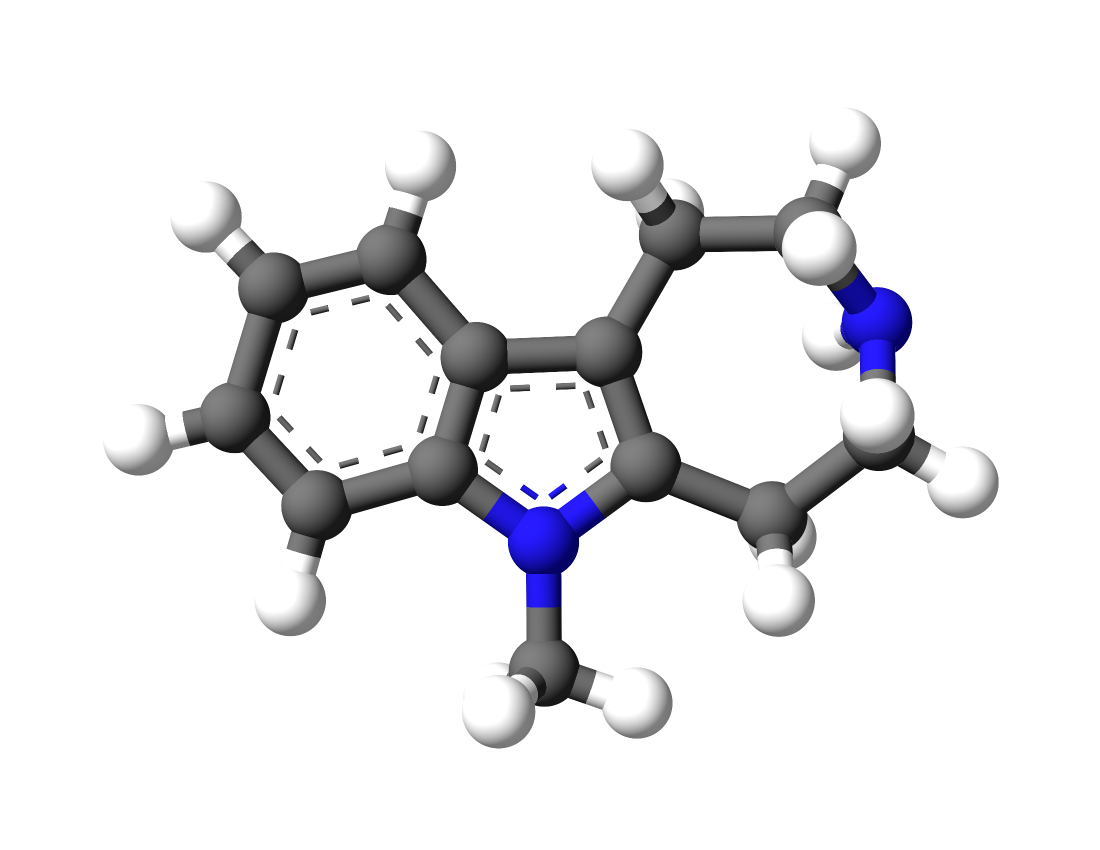

Clinical data
- Other names: PNU22394; PNU-22394A; PNU22394A; U-22394A; U22394A
- Routes of administration: Oral
- Drug class: Serotonin 5-HT_{2C} receptor agonist; Non-hallucinogenic serotonin 5-HT_{2A} receptor agonist; Serotonin 5-HT_{2B} receptor weak partial agonist or antagonist

Identifiers
- IUPAC name: 6-methyl-1,2,3,4,5,6-hexahydro-azepino[4,5-b]indole
- CAS Number: 15923-78-1
- PubChem CID: 27559
- ChemSpider: 25649
- UNII: J7HPJ854EA
- ChEMBL: ChEMBL6557
- CompTox Dashboard (EPA): DTXSID001028489

Chemical and physical data
- Formula: C_{13}H_{16}N_{2}
- Molar mass: 200.285 g·mol^{−1}
- 3D model (JSmol): Interactive image
- SMILES: C3CNCCc2c3c1ccccc1n2C
- InChI: InChI=1S/C13H16N2/c1-15-12-5-3-2-4-10(12)11-6-8-14-9-7-13(11)15/h2-5,14H,6-9H2,1H3; Key:ZBXDOQWPGBISAR-UHFFFAOYSA-N

PNU-22394, or PNU-22394A, also known as U-22394A, as well as 6-methyl-1,2,3,4,5,6-hexahydroazepino[4,5-b]indole, is a serotonin 5-HT_{2} receptor agonist of the ibogalog family which was studied as an appetite suppressant and antipsychotic but was never marketed. As an ibogalog, PNU-22394 is a cyclized tryptamine and a simplified ibogaine analogue.

== Pharmacology ==
PNU-22394 acts as a potent modulator of the serotonin 5-HT_{2A}, 5-HT_{2B}, and 5-HT_{2C} receptors. Its affinities (K_{i}), activational potencies (EC_{50}), and efficacies (E_{max}) were respectively 19 nM and 67.2 nM (64%) at the serotonin 5-HT_{2A} receptor, 28.5 nM and 71.3 nM (13%) at the serotonin 5-HT_{2B} receptor, and 18.8 nM and 18.8 nM (83%) at the serotonin 5-HT_{2C} receptor. Hence, it is a near-full agonist of the serotonin 5-HT_{2C} receptor, a moderate-efficacy partial agonist of the serotonin 5-HT_{2A} receptor, and a very weak partial agonist or antagonist of the serotonin 5-HT_{2B} receptor. Besides for the serotonin 5-HT_{2} receptors, PNU-22394 shows very weak affinity for the imidazoline I_{2} receptor (K_{i} = 1,030 nM).

PNU-22394 produces anorectic effects and weight loss in both animals and humans as well as pro-cognitive-like effects in animals. The anorectic effects of PNU-22394 in animals can be blocked by the selective serotonin 5-HT_{2C} receptor antagonist SB-242084. PNU-22394 produced side effects in humans including headache, anxiety, nausea, and vomiting, but with rapid tolerance to these side effects that developed within 4 days. Despite its activity as a potent serotonin 5-HT_{2A} receptor agonist, PNU-22394 did not produce hallucinogenic effects in humans. Other effects of PNU-22394 in animals included serotonergic tryptamine-like effects, antiaggressive effects, inhibition of conditioned avoidance, and hypothermia, as well as analgesic effects.

== History ==
PNU-22394 was first described in the scientific literature by 1967. It was originally evaluated by Upjohn in people with schizophrenia in the 1960s. It showed no antipsychotic effects, but did unexpectedly produce weight loss in most of the patients. Subsequently, in the 2000s, PNU-22394 was studied as an appetite suppressant and weight loss medication.

== Analogues ==
Various analogues of PNU-22394 have also been studied and described.

== See also ==
- Ibogalog
- Non-hallucinogenic 5-HT_{2A} receptor agonist
- Catharanthalog
- Ibogainalog
- Ibogaminalog
- Noribogainalog
- PNU-181731
- Tabernanthalog
- PHA-57378
- Lorcaserin
- Tryptoline
