= Ibogaminalog =

Chemical compound

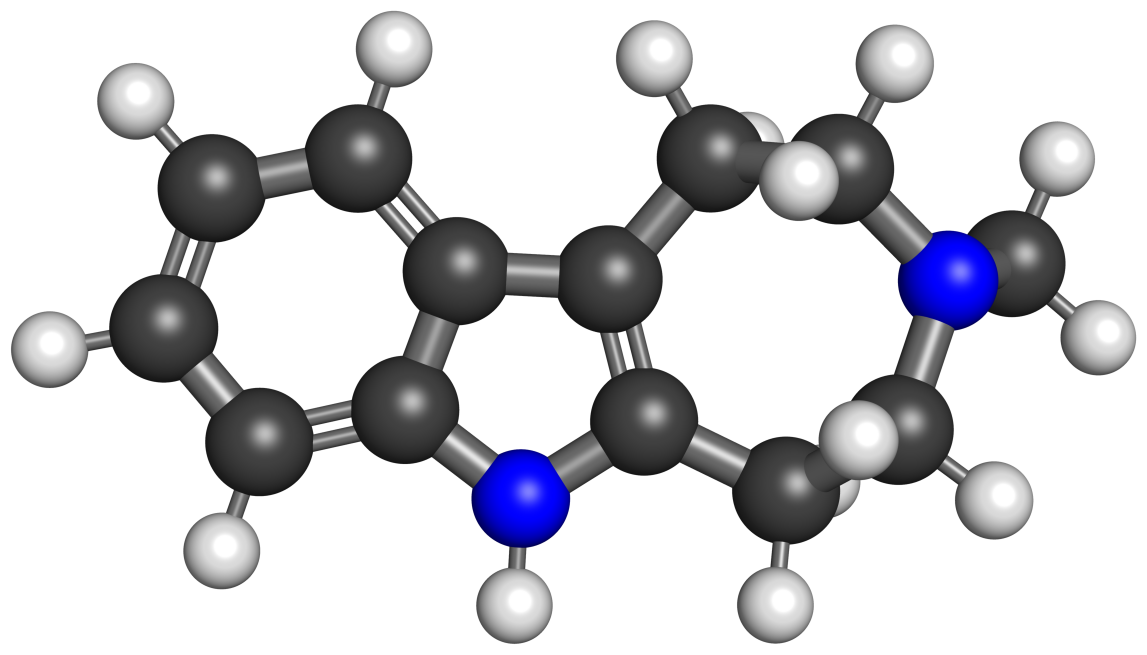

Clinical data
- Other names: DM-506; DM506
- Drug class: Non-selective serotonin receptor modulator; Non-hallucinogenic serotonin 5-HT_{2A} receptor partial agonist

Identifiers
- IUPAC name: 3-methyl-2,4,5,6-tetrahydro-1H-azepino[4,5-b]indole
- CAS Number: 7546-66-9
- PubChem CID: 24183
- ChemSpider: 22605
- CompTox Dashboard (EPA): DTXSID70226391

Chemical and physical data
- Formula: C_{13}H_{16}N_{2}
- Molar mass: 200.285 g·mol^{−1}
- 3D model (JSmol): Interactive image
- SMILES: CN1CCC2=C(CC1)NC3=CC=CC=C23
- InChI: InChI=1S/C13H16N2/c1-15-8-6-11-10-4-2-3-5-12(10)14-13(11)7-9-15/h2-5,14H,6-9H2,1H3; Key:WBCPONKOWIDTJM-UHFFFAOYSA-N

Ibogaminalog (developmental code name DM-506) is a non-selective and non-psychedelic serotonin receptor modulator of the ibogalog group related to the iboga alkaloid ibogamine but with a simplified chemical structure. It was first described in the 1960s but was subsequently further studied and reported on in the 2020s.

== Pharmacology ==
Ibogaminalog is known to act as an agonist of serotonin receptors, including of the serotonin 5-HT_{2A} receptor (K_{i} = 17–11,190 nM; EC_{50} = 2.9–34 nM; E_{max} = 33–76%), the serotonin 5-HT_{2B} receptor (K_{i} = 16.5–63,780 nM; EC_{50} = 2.9–33 nM; E_{max} = 68–69%), and the serotonin 5-HT_{6} receptor (EC_{50} = 2.9 nM; E_{max} = 96%), and as an inverse agonist of the serotonin 5-HT_{7} receptor (I_{max} = 14%).

It is a weak to very weak monoamine reuptake inhibitor, including of serotonin, norepinephrine, and dopamine (IC_{50} = 3,100 nM, 9,500 nM, and 70,000 nM, respectively), whereas it is not a significant monoamine oxidase inhibitor (MAOI) of MAO-A or MAO-B. The drug also acts weakly as a negative allosteric modulator of the α_{7} and α_{9}α_{10} nicotinic acetylcholine receptors.

Ibogaminalog does not produce the head-twitch response, a behavioral proxy of psychedelic effects, in rodents, and hence may be non-hallucinogenic in humans. On the other hand, it has been found to produce sedative, antidepressant-like, anxiolytic-like, antiaddictive-like, and analgesic-like effects in rodents.

== See also ==
- Ibogalog
- Lorcaserin
- PHA-57378
- PNU-22394
- PNU-181731
- Ibogainalog
- Tabernanthalog
- Non-hallucinogenic 5-HT_{2A} receptor agonist
