= Alstonine =

Chemical compound

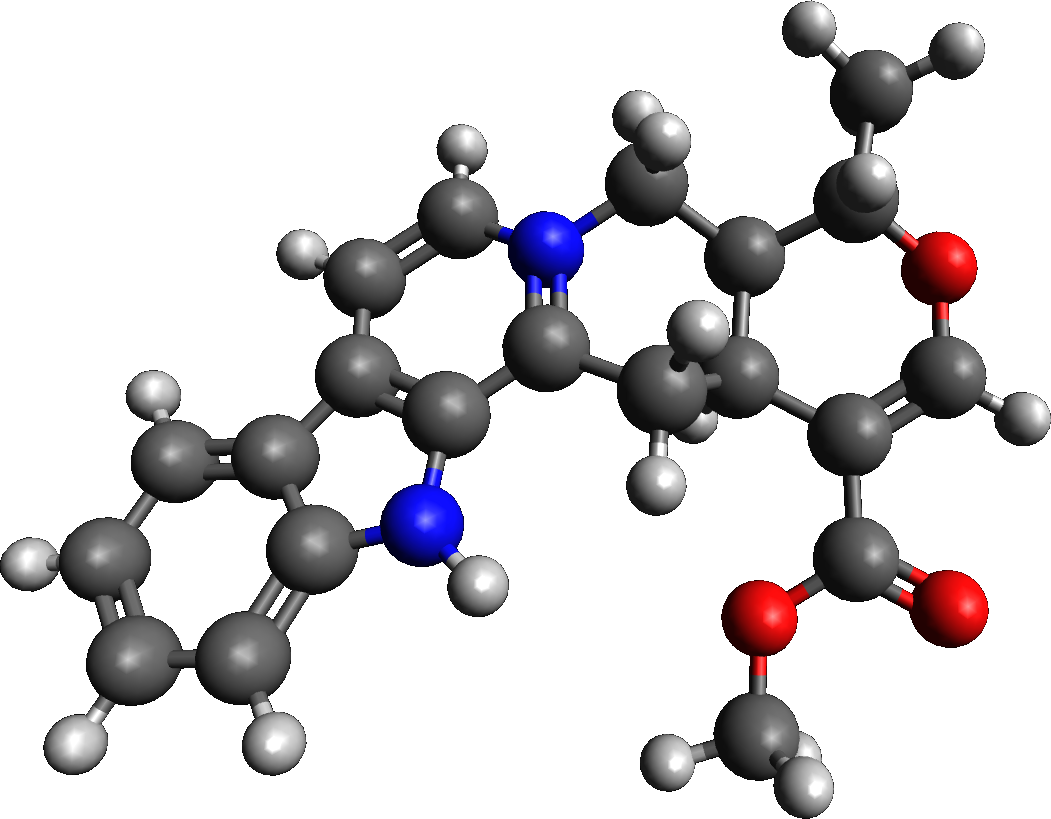

Clinical data
- ATC code: none

Identifiers
- IUPAC name: (19α,20α)-16-(Methoxycarbonyl)-19-methyl-3,4,5,6,16,17-hexadehydro-18-oxayohimban-4-ium
- CAS Number: 642-18-2
- PubChem CID: 441979
- ChemSpider: 149308
- UNII: SB0M27Q90X
- ChEBI: CHEBI:2612
- CompTox Dashboard (EPA): DTXSID201115727

Chemical and physical data
- Formula: C_{21}H_{21}N_{2}O_{3}
- Molar mass: 349.410 g·mol^{−1}
- 3D model (JSmol): Interactive image
- SMILES: O=C(OC)\C1=C\O[C@H]([C@H]5[C@@H]1Cc3[n+](ccc4c2ccccc2[nH]c34)C5)C
- InChI: InChI=InChI=1S/C21H20N2O3/c1-12-16-10-23-8-7-14-13-5-3-4-6-18(13)22-20(14)19(23)9-15(16)17(11-26-12)21(24)25-2/h3-8,11-12,15-16H,9-10H2,1-2H3/p+1/t12-,15-,16-/m0/s1; Key:WYTGDNHDOZPMIW-RCBQFDQVSA-O

Alstonine is a pentacyclic alkaloid and putative antipsychotic constituent of various plant species including Alstonia boonei, Catharanthus roseus, Picralima nitida, Rauvolfia afra and Rauvolfia vomitoria. In preclinical studies alstonine attenuates MK-801-induced hyperlocomotion, working memory deficit and social withdrawal. It also possesses anxiolytic-like effects in preclinical studies, attenuates amphetamine-induced lethality and stereotypy as well as apomorphine-induced stereotypy, and attenuates haloperidol-induced catalepsy. These effects appear to be mediated by stimulation of the 5-HT_{2C} receptor. In addition, alstonine, similarly to clozapine, indirectly inhibits the reuptake of glutamate in hippocampal slices. Unlike clozapine however, the effect of which is abolished by the D_{2} receptor agonist apomorphine, alstonine requires 5-HT_{2A} and 5-HT_{2C} receptors to produce this effect, as it is abolished by antagonists of these receptors. Also unlike clozapine, alstonine lacks pro-convulsant activity in mice.

== See also ==
- Ajmalicine
- Corynanthine
- Deserpidine
- Mitragynine
- Rauwolscine
- Spegatrine
- Reserpine
- Rescinnamine
- Yohimbine
