= Indoloquinolizidine alkaloids =

Chemical group of natural compounds

Indoloquinolizidine, basic skeleton of indoloquinolizidine alkaloids. The letters ABCD represent cycles

Numbered structure of yohimban

Indoloquinolizidine alkaloids — is a chemical group of monoterpene indole alkaloids, natural compounds of heterocyclic, tetracyclic, or pentacyclic structure, which are derivatives of indoloquinolizidine. Their structure consists of fused indole and quinolizidine systems that are divided into ABCD rings, which can be complicated by additional carbocycles. Classic examples of this group are the pentacyclic alkaloid yohimbine and rauhimbine. Among others, reserpine is also a compound containing an indolo[2,3-a]quinolizidine fragment with an additional substitution.

== Classification ==
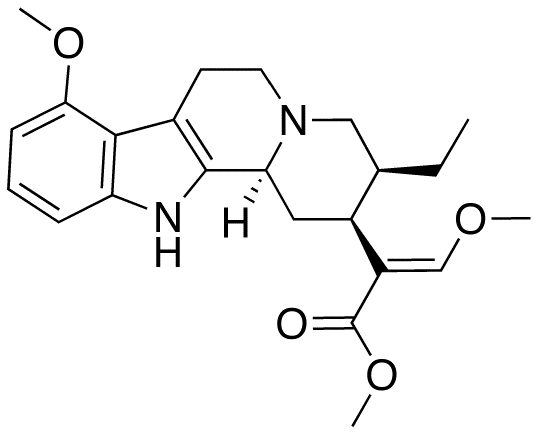
Mitragynine is a representative of indoloquinolizidine alkaloids, where substitution occurs in 2 cycles.

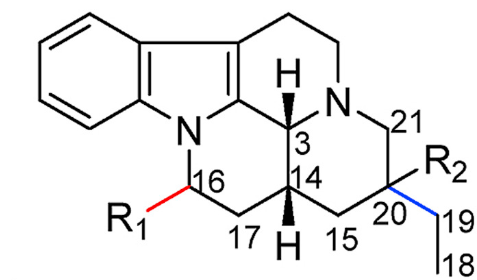
Tacaman-type alkaloid

Strychnos-type alkaloid

Depending on the spatial orientation of the hydrogen atom at C-3 and the unshared electron pair of nitrogen N-4, indoloquinolizidine alkaloids are divided into trans-articulated isomers (having a rigid planar structure) and cis-articulated isomers (with a pronounced spatial bend in the molecule), indoloquinolizidines are related to tryptoline compounds because the chemical structure of indoloquinolizidines contains a completely preserved three-ring tetrahydro-β-carboline core (rings A, B, and C), which is additionally condensed with a piperidine or other carbon ring (forming ring D), yohimban is an indoloquinolizidine that has been fused with an additional six-membered carbocycle at positions C-15 and C-20, resulting in a rigid pentacyclic system (rings A, B, C, D, E) that serves as the basic scaffold for yohimbine, reserpine, and their isomers. According to the nature of substitution, compounds are divided into those in which substitution occurs only in the carbocycle E, and compounds in which substitution occurs both in the carbocycle E and in the benzene ring A; they can be called "substituted indoloquinolizidines"; substitution most often occurs in position 16, 17 and 18 on the ring E, and in position 9 on the ring A, this is most often an ester or methoxyl group; in reserpine it is residue 3,4,5-trimethoxybenzoic acid, some compounds differ in functional groups, therefore, within the general group, other subgroups of compounds are distinguished based on the isolation method and chemical structure; it is permissible to apply the terms "types of alkaloids" to them; among many examples, these include pentacyclic alkaloids of the tacaman-type, corynanthe-type or alkaloids of the ajmaline-type; The term “structural type” is more often used for them, describing certain subtypes within large types, although compounds are more often combined into general types according to their biosynthetic origin, so the alkaloid strychnine forms an independent "strychnos-type" of alkaloids, which is a variety of corynanthe-type, since its precursor in biosynthesis is strictosidine, which is characteristic in the biosynthesis of almost every corynanthe-type compound. Is important to note that strychnine does not belong to the indoloquinolizidine alkaloids. Indoloquinolizidine alkaloids is generally considered an umbrella term, and therefore can include any compounds that retain the indolo[2,3-a]quinolizidine framework in their structure.

== Natural occurrence ==
Indoloquinolizidine alkaloids are common within families such as Apocynaceae, Rubiaceae, and Loganiaceae, and are isolated from plants of the genera Rauwolfia, Corynanthe (and the sometimes isolated genus Pausinystalia), Mitragyna, Vinca, Tabernaemontana, Kopsia, Hunteria, Melodinus, Catharanthus, Leuconotis, Uncaria, Alstonia, Ochrosia, Aspidosperma, Picralima, Amsonia, Strychnos.

The most famous sources of plant material include the species Yohimbine tree (Pausinystalia johimbe) where the main source is the bark of the tree containing yohimbine (up to 0.56 mg/g).

== Biosynthesis ==
=== Corynanthe-type ===
Indoloquinolizidine alkaloids of the corynanthe-type are biosynthesized in plants of the Apocynaceae, Loganiaceae, and Rubiaceae families by enzymatic Pictet-Spengler condensation between tryptamine and secologanin to form the universal precursor strictosidine, which, after deglycosylation by the SGD protein, spontaneously rearranges into 4,21-dehydrogeissoschisine and undergoes further oxidation-reduction modifications by enzymes of the CYP450, ADH, reductases, and methyltransferase families, which form the structural diversity of the molecules through modular.

=== Yohimbine-type ===
Indoloquinolizidine alkaloids of the yohimbine-type are biosynthesized from the central intermediate 4,21-dehydrogeissoschizine through highly stereo-flexible pathways regulated by heteroyohimbine synthase (HYS), medium-chain dehydrogenases/reductases, and tetrahydroalstonine synthase (THAS), which generate diastereomeric mixtures; the stereoselectivity of these downstream conversions is primarily determined by architectural configurations within the active site of HYS, specifically an extended, flexible "loop 2" that positions a critical histidine residue (His127) to mediate face-selective substrate protonation.

=== Mitragynine-type ===
Indoloquinolizidine alkaloids of the mitragynine-type are biosynthesized through a stereo-controlled pathway where a family of dihydrogeissoschizine synthases (DCS1–4) selectively reduces the strictosidine aglycone into either (20R)-demethylcorynantheidine (the precursor to mitragynine) or (20S)-demethyldihydrocorynantheine (the precursor to speciogynine) based on specific amino acid residues within the enzyme's active site, followed by an unprecedented functionalization step where a SABATH-family methyltransferase (MsC17OMT) oversightes the C-17 O-methylation of a non-aromatic enol.

=== Reserpine-type ===
Indoloquinolizidine alkaloids of the reserpine-type are biosynthesized through sequential enzymatic reactions starting with strictosidine. In the first step, its initial C-3α-configuration is converted to the C-3β-form, which is critical for biological activity, via a two-step epimerization: flavin-dependent oxidase RvYOO oxidizes the substrate to an iminium intermediate, which is then reduced by NADPH-dependent reductase RvDYR. Subsequent modification of the resulting scaffold includes 18β-hydroxylation by cytochrome CYP71D820, С-11 hydroxylation by cytochrome CYP72A270, and final O-methylation.

=== Ajmaline-type ===
Indoloquinolizidine alkaloids of the ajmaline-type are biosynthesized from 19E-geissochisine, which is oxidized by specific enzymes to polyneuridinaldehyde and converted to vomilenine. The final ajmaline structure is formed through the sequential reduction of intermediates by specific reductases: first, vomilenine-1,2(R)-reductase (VR) reduces vomilenine, after which 1,2-dihydrovomilenine-19,20(S)-reductase (DHVR) converts it to 17-O-acetylnorajmaline, which is finally deacetylated by acetylesterase AAE.
