= Yohimban =

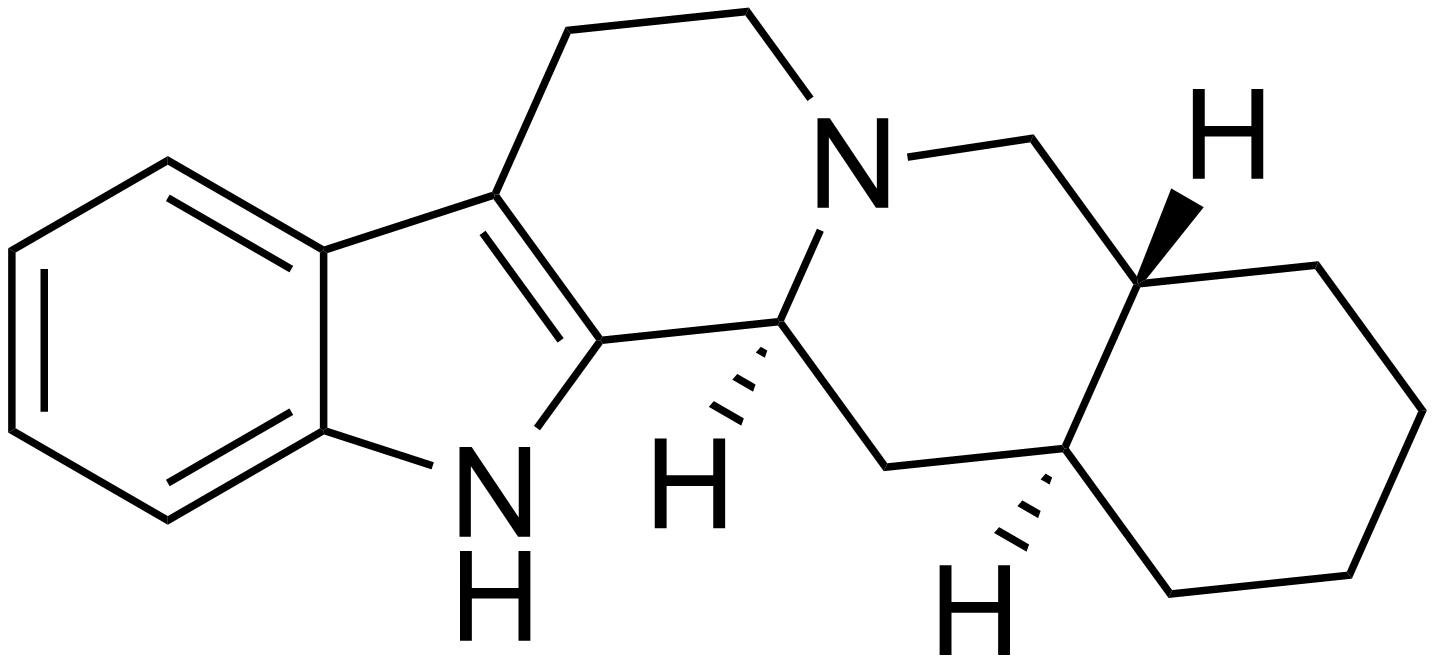
- Stereo structural formula of yohimban

Names
- IUPAC name Yohimban
- Systematic IUPAC name (4aR,13bS,14aS)-1,2,3,4,4a,5,7,8,13,13b,14,14a-Dodecahydroindolo[2′,3′:3,4]pyrido[1,2-b]isoquinoline
- Other names: Yohimbane; Deoxyohimbol

Identifiers
CAS Number	523-06-8
3D model (JSmol)	Interactive image
ChEBI	CHEBI:35631
ChEMBL	ChEMBL318269
ChemSpider	107762
PubChem CID	120717
UNII	6R2D2XM7CG
CompTox Dashboard (EPA)	DTXSID50964042
- InChI: InChI=1S/C19H24N2/c1-2-6-14-12-21-10-9-16-15-7-3-4-8-17(15)20-19(16)18(21)11-13(14)5-1/h3-4,7-8,13-14,18,20H,1-2,5-6,9-12H2/t13-,14-,18-/m0/s1 Key: JUPDIHMJFPDGMY-DEYYWGMASA-N
- SMILES: [H][C@@]12CCCC[C@@]1([H])C[C@]1([H])N(CCC3=C1NC1=CC=CC=C31)C2

Properties
Chemical formula	C_{19}H_{24}N_{2}
Molar mass	280.415 g·mol^{−1}
- Except where otherwise noted, data are given for materials in their standard state (at 25 °C [77 °F], 100 kPa). Infobox references

Yohimban is a chemical compound. It is the base chemical structure of various alkaloids in the Rauvolfia and Corynanthe plant genera, including yohimbine, rauwolscine, corynanthine, ajmalicine, reserpine, deserpidine, and rescinnamine, among others.
