= Vinorine hydroxylase =

Identifiers
- EC no.: 1.14.14.104
- CAS no.: 162875-03-8

Databases
- IntEnz: IntEnz view
- BRENDA: BRENDA entry
- ExPASy: NiceZyme view
- KEGG: KEGG entry
- MetaCyc: metabolic pathway
- PRIAM: profile
- PDB structures: RCSB PDB PDBe PDBsum
- Gene Ontology: AmiGO / QuickGO
Search
- PMC: articles
- PubMed: articles
- NCBI: proteins

Vinorine hydroxylase (EC 1.14.14.104, Formerly EC 1.14.13.75) is an enzyme that catalyzes the chemical reaction

vinorine
O_{2}
H_{2}O
vomilenine

Vinorine hydroxylase is a cytochrome P450 protein containing heme, isolated from Rauwolfia serpentina. It requires a partner cytochrome P450 reductase for functional expression. This uses nicotinamide adenine dinucleotide phosphate. The systematic name of this enzyme class is vinorine,NADPH:oxygen oxidoreductase (21alpha-hydroxylating). This enzyme is part of the biosynthetic pathway to the indole alkaloid, ajmaline.
