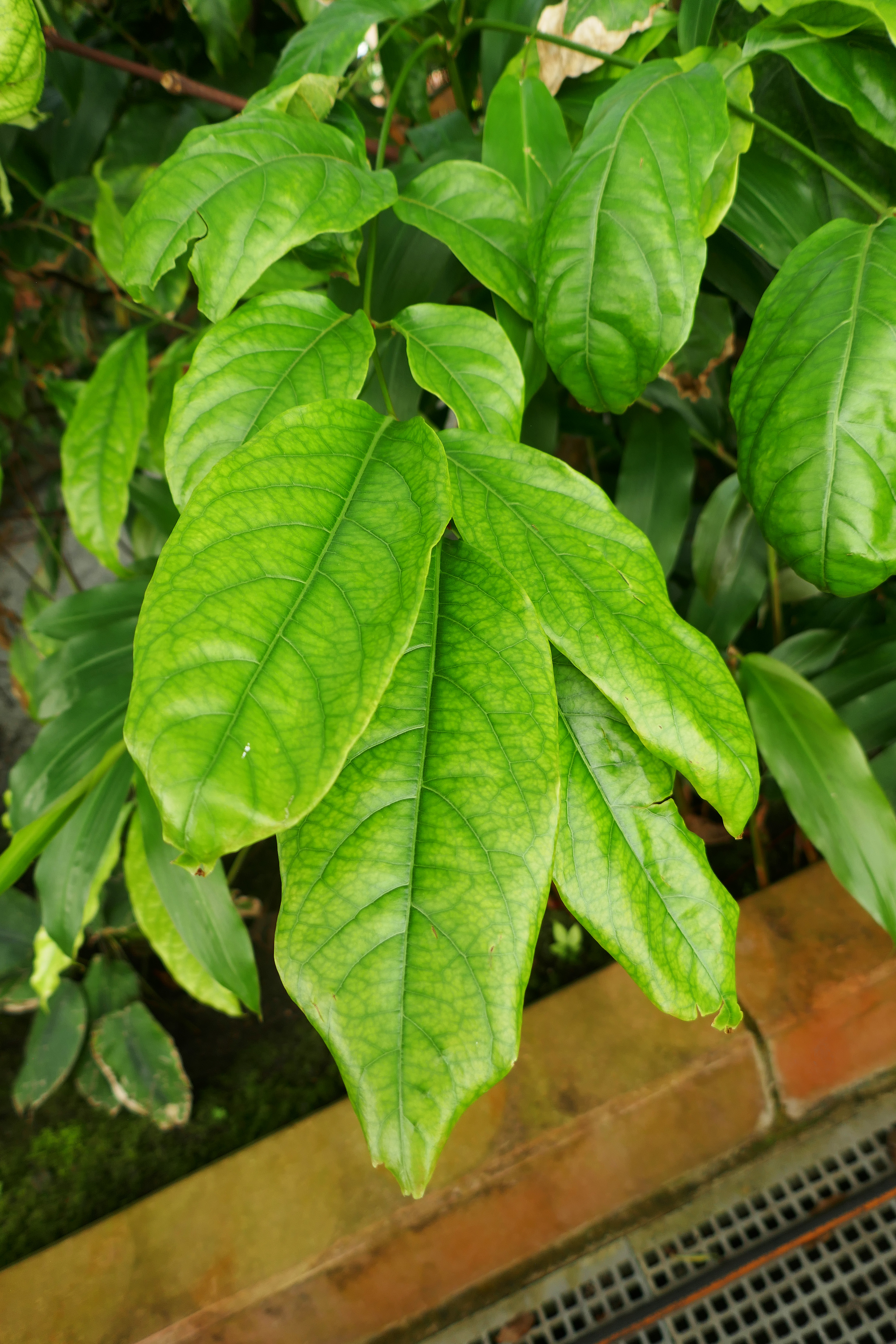

Conservation status
- Least Concern (IUCN 3.1)

Scientific classification
- Kingdom: Plantae
- Clade: Embryophytes
- Clade: Tracheophytes
- Clade: Angiosperms
- Clade: Eudicots
- Clade: Asterids
- Order: Gentianales
- Family: Apocynaceae
- Genus: Rauvolfia
- Species: R. vomitoria

Binomial name
- Rauvolfia vomitoria Afzel., 1817

Synonyms
- Rauvolfia congolana De Wild. & T.Durand; Rauvolfia pleiosiadica K.Schum.; Rauvolfia senegambiae DC.; Rauvolfia stuhlmannii K.Schum.

= Rauvolfia vomitoria =

Species of plant

Rauvolfia vomitoria, the poison devil's-pepper, is a plant species in the genus Rauvolfia. It is native from Senegal east to Sudan and Tanzania, south to Angola; and naturalized in China, Bangladesh, different ranges of Himalayan and Puerto Rico. The plant contains a number of compounds of interest to the pharmaceutical industry and is widely used in traditional medicine.

== Description ==
Rauvolfia vomitoria is a small tree or large shrub, growing to 26 ft (8m) high. The branches grow in whorls, and the leaves grow from swollen nodes in groups of three. The leaf blades are broadly lanceolate or elliptical, tapering to a long point. The small, fragrant flowers are followed by globular red fruit. All parts of the plant, except the mature wood, contain latex.

== Ecology ==
This is a fast-growing tree that produces large quantities of seeds which are dispersed by birds. The seedlings and saplings are tolerant of shade and the tree regenerates after cutting or burning, soon forming dense thickets.

Rauvolfia vomitoria has been identified as an invasive species in the Hawaiian island of Oahu.

== Uses ==
Rauvolfia vomitoria has been used across its range in traditional medicine. A decoction or extract of the roots is used for diarrhea, jaundice, venereal disease, rheumatism, snake-bites, colic, fever, to calm people with anxiety or epilepsy, and to lower blood pressure. The macerated root, or sometimes the pulped fruit, is used for a variety of skin conditions, and the bark, twigs, and leaves are used as a purgative and emetic.

Every part of the tree is toxic, and this is put to use with a paste made from the pulverized root being coated on arrow tips and spears for hunting, and by being mixed with cassava meal to make rat poison.

The plant contains a number of chemical compounds used by the pharmaceutical industry; these include reserpine, reserpinine, deserpidine, ajmalicine, and ajmaline. In the 1970s, the bark from stems and roots was harvested from which reserpine was extracted and sold for human use. Reserpine is still available, but has been largely replaced by less toxic products. 2,6-Dimethoxybenzoquinone is a benzoquinone found in R. vomitoria.
