= Vomilenine reductase =

vomilenine reductase

Identifiers
- EC no.: 1.5.1.32
- CAS no.: 462127-03-3

Databases
- IntEnz: IntEnz view
- BRENDA: BRENDA entry
- ExPASy: NiceZyme view
- KEGG: KEGG entry
- MetaCyc: metabolic pathway
- PRIAM: profile
- PDB structures: RCSB PDB PDBe PDBsum
- Gene Ontology: AmiGO / QuickGO
Search
- PMC: articles
- PubMed: articles
- NCBI: proteins

In enzymology, a vomilenine reductase (EC 1.5.1.32) is an enzyme that catalyzes the chemical reaction

1,2-dihydrovomilenine + NADP^{+} $\rightleftharpoons$ vomilenine + NADPH + H^{+}

Thus, the two substrates of this enzyme are 1,2-dihydrovomilenine and NADP^{+}, whereas its 3 products are vomilenine, NADPH, and H^{+}.

This enzyme belongs to the family of oxidoreductases, specifically those acting on the CH-NH group of donors with NAD+ or NADP+ as acceptor. The systematic name of this enzyme class is 1,2-dihydrovomilenine:NADP+ oxidoreductase. This enzyme participates in indole and ipecac alkaloid biosynthesis.
