= Vomilenine glucosyltransferase =

Class of enzymes

Identifiers
- EC no.: 2.4.1.219

Databases
- IntEnz: IntEnz view
- BRENDA: BRENDA entry
- ExPASy: NiceZyme view
- KEGG: KEGG entry
- MetaCyc: metabolic pathway
- PRIAM: profile
- PDB structures: RCSB PDB PDBe PDBsum
- Gene Ontology: AmiGO / QuickGO
Search
- PMC: articles
- PubMed: articles
- NCBI: proteins

Vomilenine glucosyltransferase (EC 2.4.1.219) is an enzyme that catalyzes the chemical reaction

vomilenine
+ UDP-glucose
UDP
raucaffricine

The two substrates of this enzyme characterised from Rauwolfia serpentina are vomilenine and UDP-glucose. Its products are raucaffricine and uridine diphosphate (UDP). Raucaffricine is the major indole alkaloid found in this species of plant.

This enzyme belongs to the family of glycosyltransferases, specifically the hexosyltransferases. The systematic name of this enzyme class is UDP-glucose:vomilenine 21-O-beta-D-glucosyltransferase. This enzyme is also called UDPG:vomilenine 21-beta-D-glucosyltransferase.
