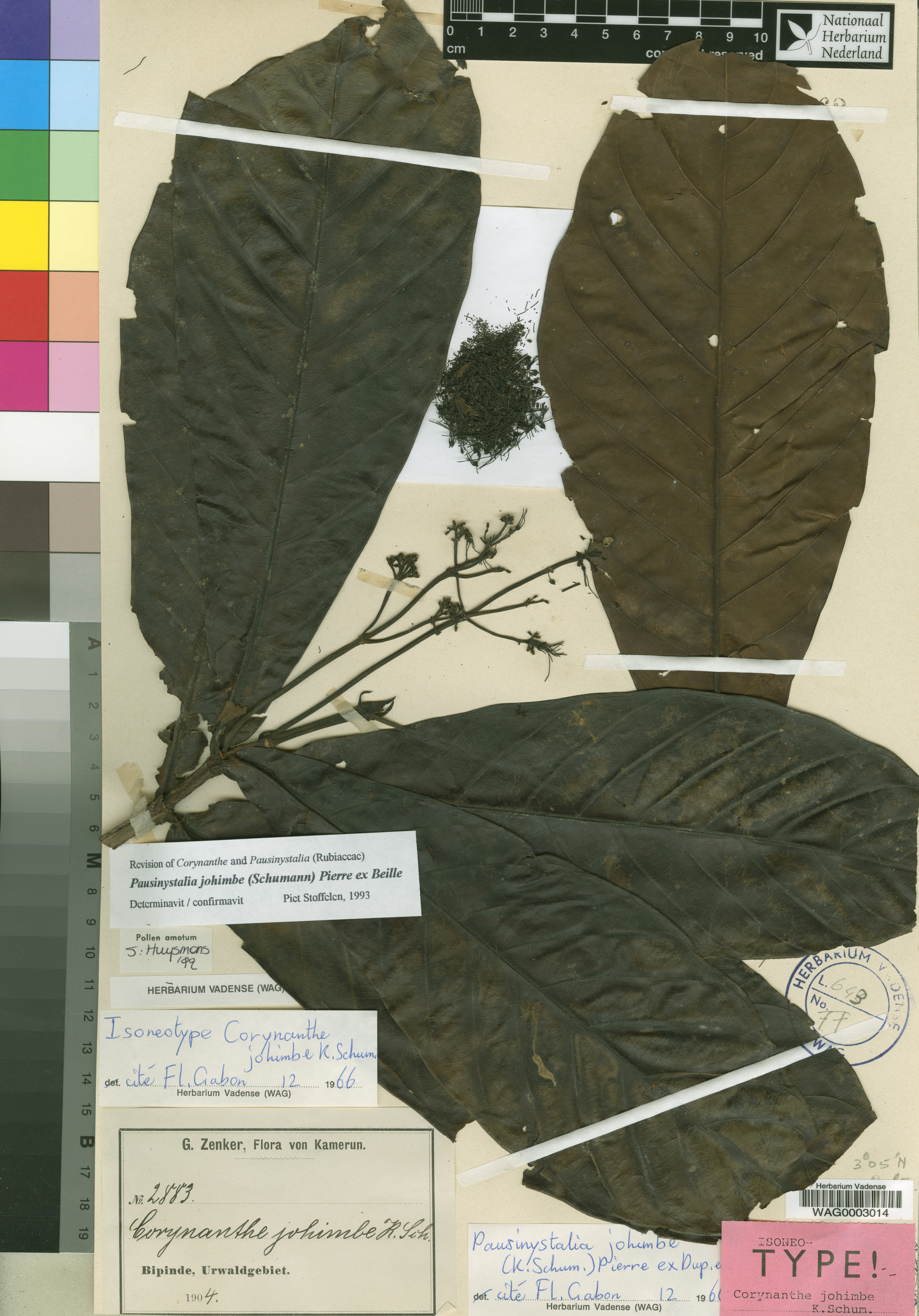

Scientific classification
- Kingdom: Plantae
- Clade: Tracheophytes
- Clade: Angiosperms
- Clade: Eudicots
- Clade: Asterids
- Order: Gentianales
- Family: Rubiaceae
- Genus: Corynanthe
- Species: C. johimbe

Binomial name
- Corynanthe johimbe K.Schum.

Synonyms
- Pausinystalia johimbe (K.Schum.) Pierre; Pausinystalia zenkeri W.Brandt

= Corynanthe johimbe =

Yohimbe

Species of flowering plant

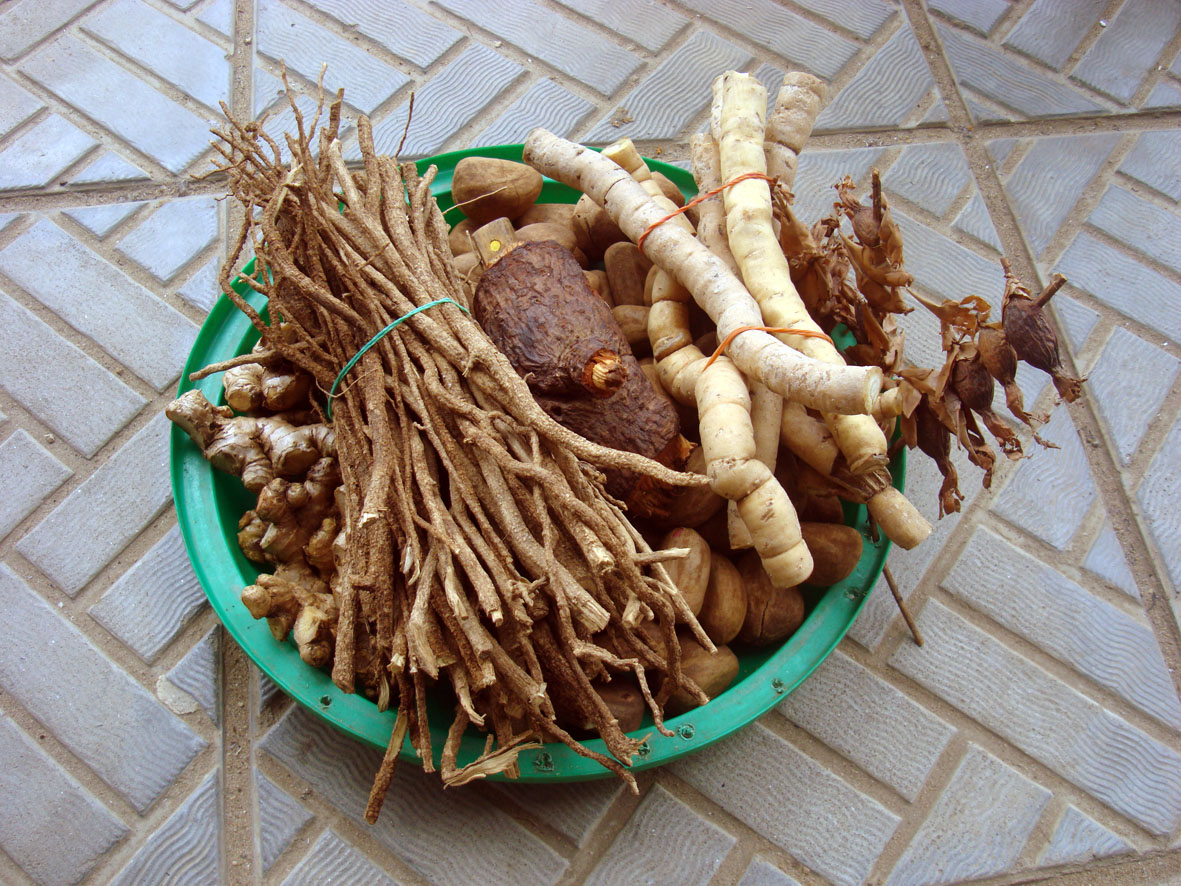
Plants including yohimbe.

Corynanthe johimbe, synonym Pausinystalia johimbe, common name yohimbe, is a plant species in the family Rubiaceae native to western and central Africa (Nigeria, Cabinda, Cameroon, Congo-Brazzaville, Gabon, Equatorial Guinea).

Extracts from yohimbe have been used in traditional medicine in West Africa as an aphrodisiac, and have been marketed in developed countries as dietary supplements. The extracts and supplements have no proven effectiveness and pose safety concerns due to variable yohimbine levels and potential adverse effects, such as hypertension and insomnia.

== Synonyms ==
=== Botanical ===
According to Royal Botanical Gardens Kew, Plants of the World Online, the accepted name is Corynanthe johimbe K.Schum (first published in Notizbl. Bot. Gart. Berlin-Dahlem 3: 94, 1901) and it has the following recognised synonyms:

Homotypic:

- Pausinystalia johimbe (K.Schum.) Pierre in Actes Soc. Linn. Bordeaux 61: 130 (1906)
- Pseudocinchona johimbe (K.Schum.) A.Chev. in : 266 (1926)

Heterotypic:

- Pausinystalia trillesii Beille in Actes Soc. Linn. Bordeaux 61: 130 (1906)
- Pausinystalia zenkeri W.Brandt in Arch. Pharm. (Berlin) 260: 67 (1922).

=== Scientific (general) ===
In scientific papers generally (i.e. not just in specialist botanical literature) the usage Pausinystalia johimbe is the most frequent, followed by Pausinystalia yohimbe.

== Description ==
Yohimbe is one of a number of Corynanthe evergreen species growing in West and Central Africa in lowland forests. The tree grows about 30 m (98 ft) tall, with a straight bole that is rarely larger than 50–60 cm (20–24 in) in diameter. The bark is grey to reddish-brown, with longitudinal fissures, easy to peel and bitter-tasting. The inner bark is pinkish and fibrous. The sapwood is yellowish and the heartwood is ochre-yellow; the wood is fine-grained and relatively dense and moderately hard. The leaves grow in groups of three, with short (about 2 cm) petioles. The blades are oval-shaped, 11–47 cm long and 5–17 cm wide.

== Conservation ==
The demand for yohimbe bark has led to over-exploitation, with the possibility of long-term threat to sustainability of the species. Cameroon is the biggest exporter. Over-exploitation has led to concerns that C. johimbe is becoming an endangered species.

== Uses ==
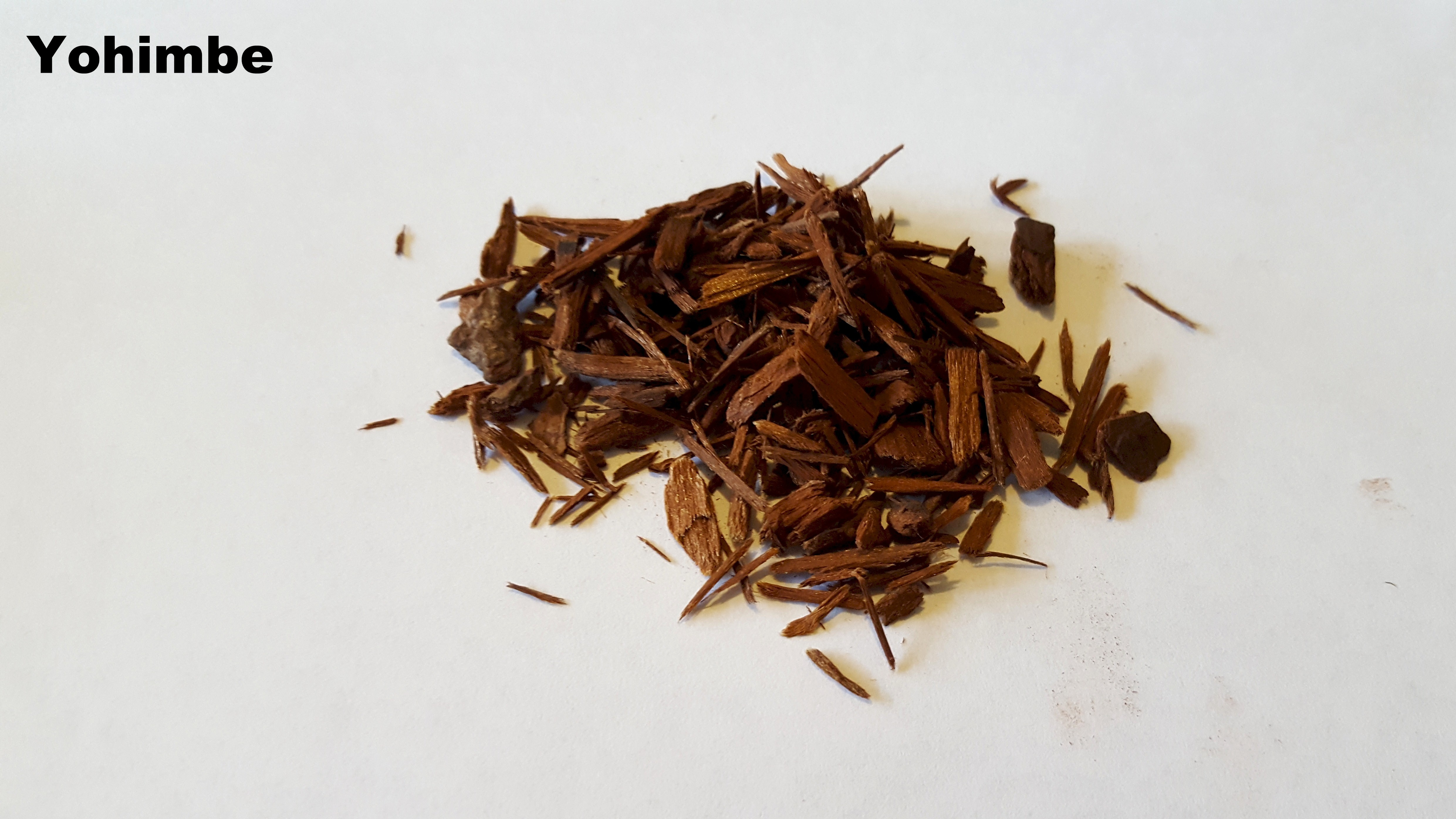
Yohimbe bark

The wood and bark are used for firewood and construction. Bark – the most commercially important product – is used in extractions to make tinctures for traditional medicine and dietary supplements.

The main phytochemical in the extract is the indoloquinolizidine alkaloid yohimbine. It also contains other alkaloids, such as corynanthine and raubasine, with undefined properties, adding further to concerns about its safety.

=== Human use and adverse effects ===
Extracts from yohimbe bark are used in West African traditional medicine in the belief that it is a herbal tonic and aphrodisiac.

Yohimbe bark and extract are used in manufactured dietary supplements, but there is inconclusive scientific evidence that they have an effect or are safe to use, as yohimbine levels may vary substantially among supplement products. Yohimbe bark extract is insufficiently characterized for its properties, and is possibly unsafe to consume.

Although proposed as a potential treatment for erectile dysfunction in humans, there are concerns about the safety of yohimbe and no good evidence for its effectiveness. Adverse effects of using yohimbe, particularly in high doses, may include hypertension, increased heart rate, headache, nausea, tremors, and insomnia.

Yohimbe products should not be used during pregnancy or breastfeeding.

== See also ==
- Coffea
- Mitragyna speciosa
- List of herbs with known adverse effects
- Yohimbine
