= Raucaffricine beta-glucosidase =

Class of enzymes

Raucaffricine β-glucosidase

Identifiers
- EC no.: 3.2.1.125
- CAS no.: 102925-37-1

Databases
- BRENDA: enzyme data
- ExPASy: NiceZyme view
- KEGG: enzyme entry
- MetaCyc: metabolic pathway
- Rhea: reactions
- PDB structures: RCSB PDB PDBe PDBsum
- Gene Ontology: AmiGO / QuickGO
Search
- PMC: articles
- PubMed: articles
- NCBI: proteins

The enzyme raucaffricine β-glucosidase (EC 3.2.1.125) catalyzes the following chemical reaction:

raucaffricine
H_{2}O
vomilenine
+
D-glucose

The enzyme characterised from Rauwolfia serpentina species removes the glycoside unit from the indole alkaloid, raucaffricine, to give vomilenine and D-glucose.

This enzyme is a hydrolase, specifically a glycosidase that hydrolyses O- and S-glycosyl compounds. The systematic name of this enzyme class is raucaffricine β-D-glucohydrolase. Other names include raucaffricine β-D-glucosidase, and raucaffricine glucosidase.
