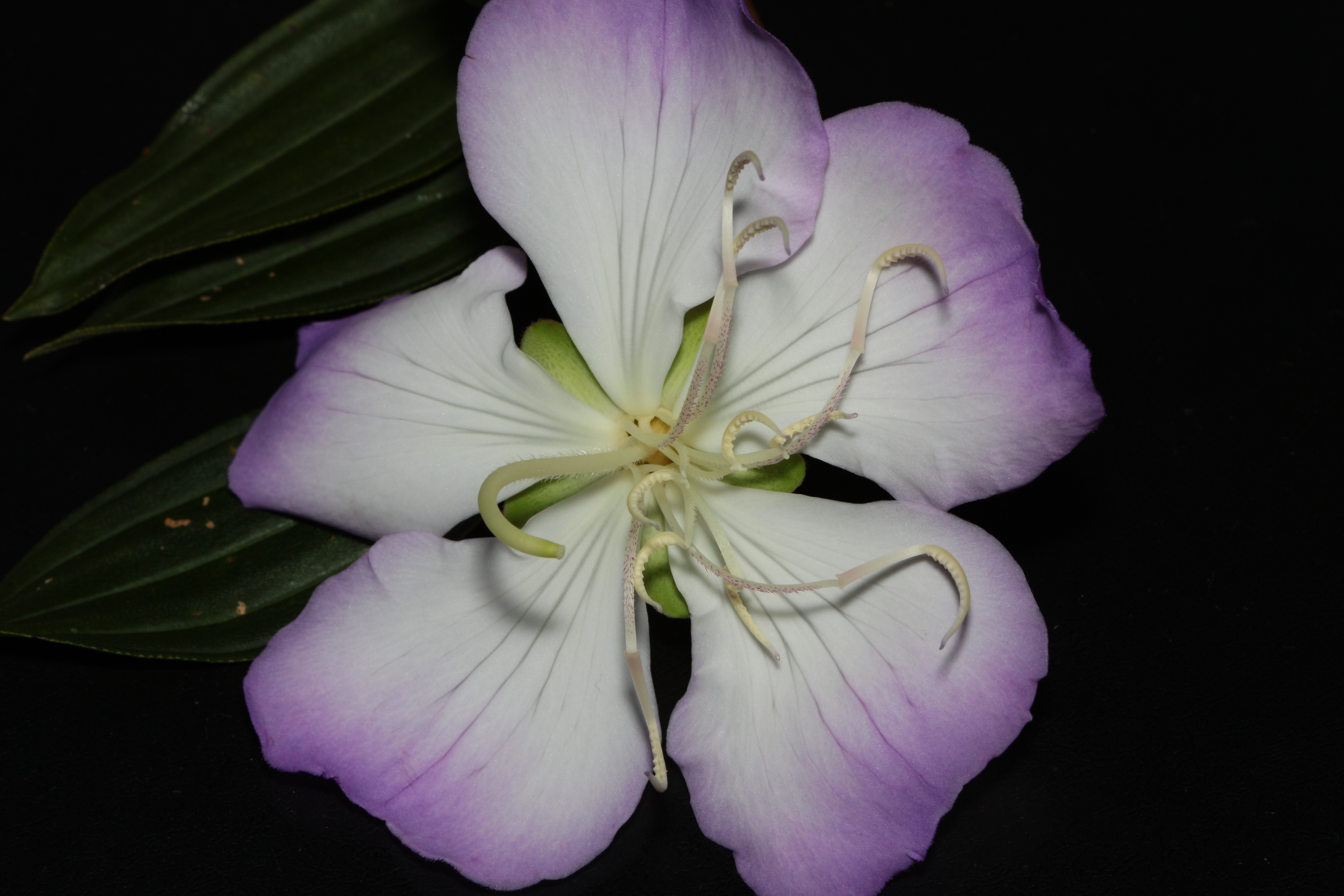

Scientific classification
- Kingdom: Plantae
- Clade: Tracheophytes
- Clade: Angiosperms
- Clade: Eudicots
- Clade: Rosids
- Order: Myrtales
- Family: Melastomataceae
- Genus: Pleroma
- Species: P. raddianum

Binomial name
- Pleroma raddianum (DC.) Gardner

Synonyms
- Lasiandra pulchra Cham.; Lasiandra raddiana DC.; Lasiandra versicolor Naudin; Pleroma pulchrum (Cham.) Triana; Rhexia uniflora Raddi; Tibouchina petroniana Cogn. & Saldanha; Tibouchina pulchra (Cham.) Cogn.; Tibouchina raddiana (DC.) Cogn.; Tibouchina saldanhaei Cogn.

= Pleroma raddianum =

Species of tree

Pleroma raddianum, synonyms including Pleroma pulchrum (Cham.) Triana and Tibouchina pulchra, is a plant species in the family Melastomataceae.

It is a pioneer tree species, growing after land degradation, in the Atlantic Rainforest of Sao Paulo State in Brazil, a forest which only 12 percent of original area remains.

2,6-Dimethoxybenzoquinone is a toxic chemical compound found in P. raddianum.

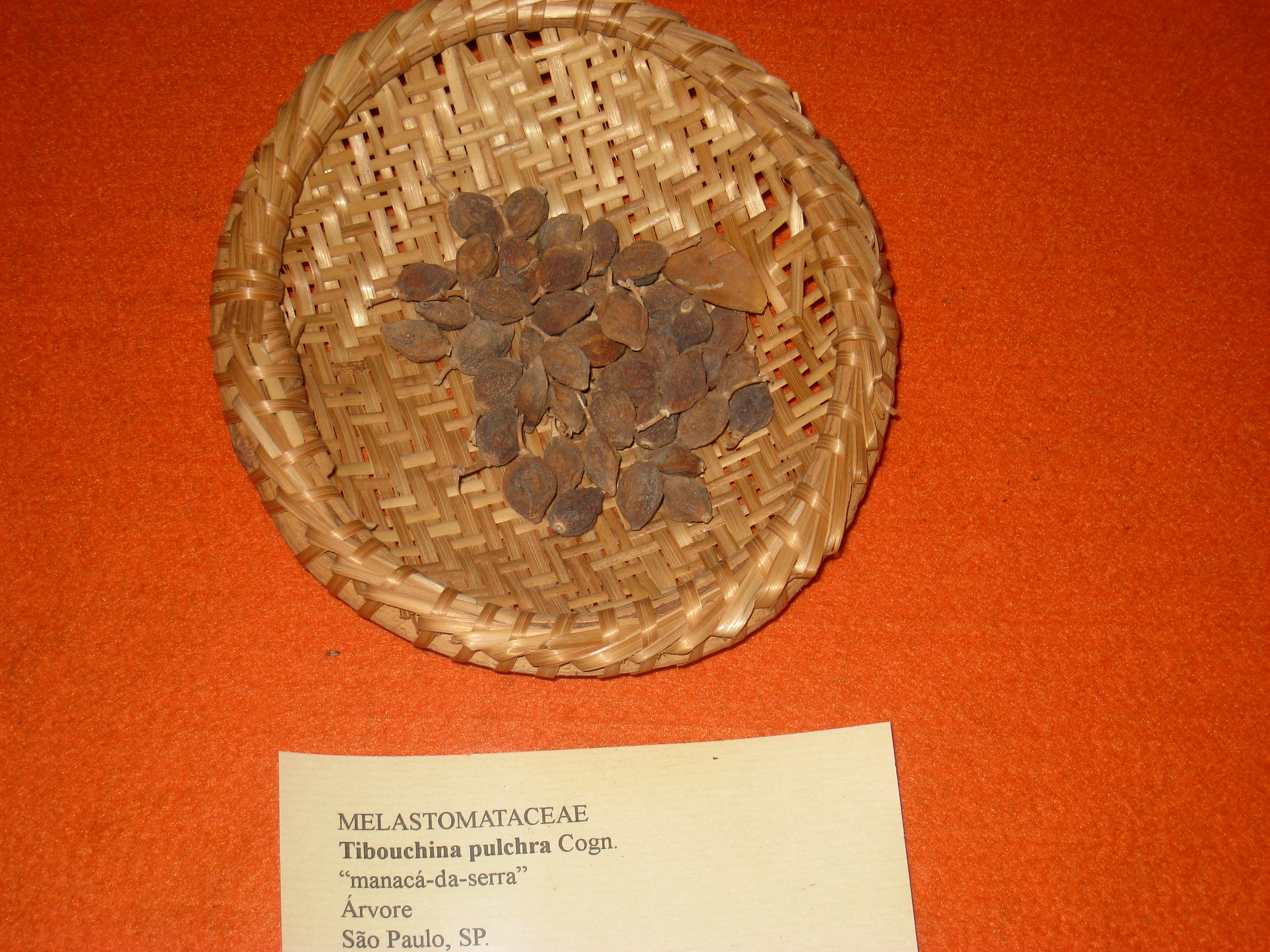
Specimen in the Museu Botânico Dr. João Barbosa Rodrigues, Jardim Botânico de São Paulo, São Paulo City, Brazil

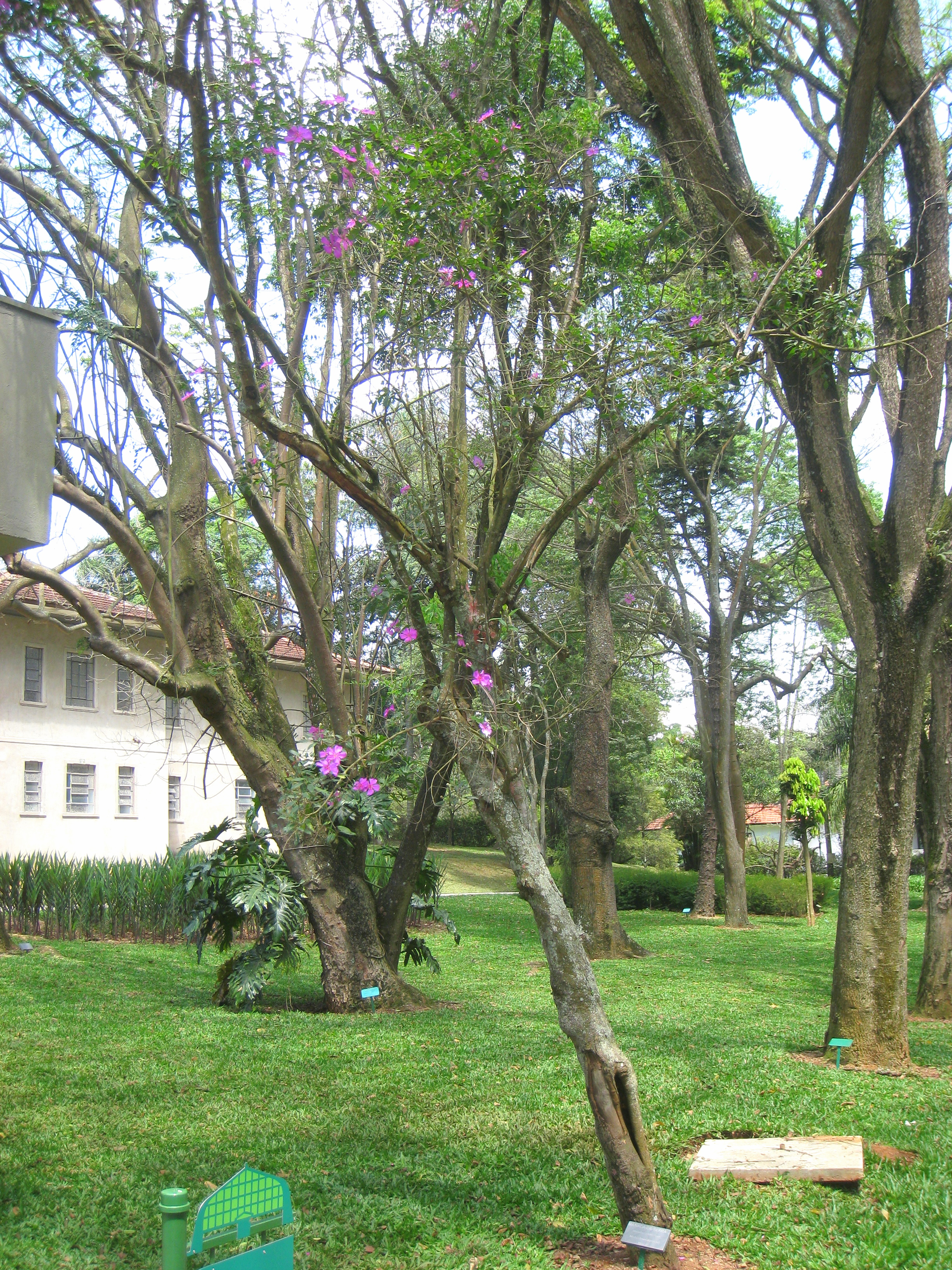
