= 4,21-Dehydrogeissoschizine =

Names
- IUPAC name (16Z)-17-Hydroxy-16-(methoxycarbonyl)-4,16,17,19,20,21-hexadehydro-17,18-seco-4λ^{5}-yohimban-4-ylium
- Systematic IUPAC name (2S,3E,12bS)-3-Ethylidene-2-[(1Z)-1-hydroxy-3-methoxy-3-oxoprop-1-en-2-yl]-2,3,6,7,12,12b-hexahydro-1H-5λ^{5}-indolo[2,3-a]quinolizin-5-ylium

Identifiers
| CAS Number | 73385-56-5 |
| 3D model (JSmol) | Interactive image |
| ChEBI | CHEBI:17294 |
| ChemSpider | 4444227 |
| PubChem CID | 5280619 |
| UNII | Z3D2Q8C832 |
| CompTox Dashboard (EPA) | DTXSID90415063 |
- InChI: InChI=1S/C21H22N2O3/c1-3-13-11-23-9-8-15-14-6-4-5-7-18(14)22-20(15)19(23)10-16(13)17(12-24)21(25)26-2/h3-7,11-12,16,19,22H,8-10H2,1-2H3/p+1/b13-3-/t16-,19-/m0/s1 Key: CUHFIPBCFIPFJM-JXSBNBLESA-O; InChI=1/C21H22N2O3/c1-3-13-11-23-9-8-15-14-6-4-5-7-18(14)22-20(15)19(23)10-16(13)17(12-24)21(25)26-2/h3-7,11-12,16,19,22H,8-10H2,1-2H3/p+1/b13-3-/t16-,19-/m0/s1 Key: CUHFIPBCFIPFJM-XNRICKBFBB
- SMILES: [H][C@@]12C[C@H](\C(=C\O)C(=O)OC)\C(=C/C)C=[N+]1CCC1=C2NC2=CC=CC=C12

Properties
| Chemical formula | C_{21}H_{23}N_{2}O_{3} |
| Molar mass | 351.426 g·mol^{−1} |
- Except where otherwise noted, data are given for materials in their standard state (at 25 °C [77 °F], 100 kPa). Infobox references

4,21-Dehydrogeissoschizine is a terpene indole alkaloid. It is believed to be the precursor leading to the formation of the aspidosperma, corynanthe, and iboga classes of terpene indole alkaloids.
