= Corynanthe brachythyrsus =

Conservation status
- Extinct (IUCN 2.3)

Scientific classification
- Kingdom: Plantae
- Clade: Tracheophytes
- Clade: Angiosperms
- Clade: Eudicots
- Clade: Asterids
- Order: Gentianales
- Family: Rubiaceae
- Genus: Corynanthe
- Species: †C. brachythyrsus

Binomial name
- †Corynanthe brachythyrsus K.Schum.

Synonyms
- Pausinystalia brachythyrsum

Species of plant

Corynanthe brachythyrsus, synonym Pausinystalia brachythyrsum, was a species of plant in the family Rubiaceae. It was endemic to Cameroon.

== Sources ==
- World Conservation Monitoring Centre (1998). "Pausinystalia brachythyrsum". IUCN Red List of Threatened Species. 1998 e.T36157A9978900. doi:10.2305/IUCN.UK.1998.RLTS.T36157A9978900.en.
