= Carbutamide =

Chemical compound

Clinical data
- Other names: Glybutamide
- AHFS/Drugs.com: International Drug Names
- Routes of administration: Oral
- ATC code: A10BB06 (WHO)

Identifiers
- IUPAC name: 4-amino-N-(butylcarbamoyl)benzenesulfonamide
- CAS Number: 339-43-5
- PubChem CID: 9564
- ChemSpider: 9189
- UNII: E3K8P4869P
- ChEMBL: ChEMBL448570
- CompTox Dashboard (EPA): DTXSID8022741
- ECHA InfoCard: 100.005.841

Chemical and physical data
- Formula: C_{11}H_{17}N_{3}O_{3}S
- Molar mass: 271.33 g·mol^{−1}
- 3D model (JSmol): Interactive image
- SMILES: O=S(=O)(c1ccc(N)cc1)NC(=O)NCCCC
- InChI: InChI=1S/C11H17N3O3S/c1-2-3-8-13-11(15)14-18(16,17)10-6-4-9(12)5-7-10/h4-7H,2-3,8,12H2,1H3,(H2,13,14,15); Key:VDTNNGKXZGSZIP-UHFFFAOYSA-N

Carbutamide (brand name Glucidoral) is an anti-diabetic drug of the sulfonylurea class, developed by Servier.

It is classified as first-generation.

It was patented in 1953 and approved for medical use in 1956.

== See also ==
- Hellmuth Kleinsorge (1920-2001) German medical doctor
