= Hellmuth Kleinsorge =

German physician

Hellmuth Kleinsorge (* 12 April 1920 in Beuel; † 7 July 2001) was a German medical doctor.

== Life ==
Hellmuth Kleinsorge studied medicine in Jena. In 1953, after his dissertation and habilitation, he became director of the "Medizinische Poliklinik in Jena". In 1958 - 1960 he was also head of the medical faculty of Jena University (then in the German Democratic Republic). He was the first to show the blood sugar decreasing effect of sulfonamides (particularly carbutamide) and he could also show the anti-arrhythmic effects of ajmaline.

As he did not give his acceptance to the Berlin Wall he had to leave is position in Jena in 1962 and became director of a local hospital in Schwerin.

He fled the GDR in 1968 and became head of research at Knoll AG (which later became part of the BASF). He also held a professorship at the "Klinikum Mannheim der Universität Heidelberg".

From 1981 - 1987 he was CEO of the Medizinisch-Pharazeutische-Studiengesellschaft and scientific advisor of the Paul Martini Stiftung. From 1987 - 1992 he was editor of the "Neuen Ärztliche", a daily paper for medics from the publishing house of the Frankfurter Allgemeine Zeitung.

Until his death Hellmuth Kleinsorge was consultant to the pharmaceutical industry, as well as to scientific publishing houses and public institutions. Amongst his awards were the Ernst-von-Bergmann-Plakette of the German Medical Association as well as the Bundesverdienstkreuz am Bande (Federal Cross of Merit).
