= 2,6-Dimethoxybenzoquinone =

- Chemical structure of 2,6-dimethoxybenzoquinone

Names
- Preferred IUPAC name 2,6-Dimethoxycyclohexa-2,5-diene-1,4-dione
- Other names 2,6-Dimethoxy-1,4-benzoquinone; 2,6-DMBQ

Identifiers
| CAS Number | 530-55-2 |
| 3D model (JSmol) | Interactive image |
| ChEMBL | ChEMBL448515 |
| ChemSpider | 61560 |
| ECHA InfoCard | 100.007.714 |
| PubChem CID | 68262 |
| UNII | 1Z701W789S |
| CompTox Dashboard (EPA) | DTXSID80862128 |
- InChI: InChI=1S/C8H8O4/c1-11-6-3-5(9)4-7(12-2)8(6)10/h3-4H,1-2H3 Key: OLBNOBQOQZRLMP-UHFFFAOYSA-N
- SMILES: O=C1C(/OC)=C\C(=O)\C=C1\OC

Properties
| Chemical formula | C_{8}H_{8}O_{4} |
| Molar mass | 168.148 g·mol^{−1} |
- Except where otherwise noted, data are given for materials in their standard state (at 25 °C [77 °F], 100 kPa). verify (what is ?) Infobox references

2,6-Dimethoxybenzoquinone (2,6-DMBQ) is a chemical compound, classified as a benzoquinone, that has been found in Rauvolfia vomitoria and in Tibouchina pulchra.

== Toxicity ==
At physiological concentrations 2,6-dimethoxybenzoquinone is an antibacterial substance. At higher concentrations there is evidence that it is mutagenic, cytotoxic, genotoxic, and hepatotoxic. Some reports have challenged its mutagenicity and others exclude such a possibility.
