= Vinorine synthase =

Class of enzymes

vinorine synthase

Identifiers
- EC no.: 2.3.1.160
- CAS no.: 88844-97-7

Databases
- IntEnz: IntEnz view
- BRENDA: BRENDA entry
- ExPASy: NiceZyme view
- KEGG: KEGG entry
- MetaCyc: metabolic pathway
- PRIAM: profile
- PDB structures: RCSB PDB PDBe PDBsum
- Gene Ontology: AmiGO / QuickGO
Search
- PMC: articles
- PubMed: articles
- NCBI: proteins

In enzymology, a vinorine synthase (EC 2.3.1.160) is an enzyme that catalyzes the chemical reaction

acetyl-CoA + 16-epivellosimine $\rightleftharpoons$ CoA + vinorine

Thus, the two substrates of this enzyme are acetyl-CoA and 16-epivellosimine, whereas its two products are CoA and vinorine.

This enzyme belongs to the family of transferases, specifically those acyltransferases transferring groups other than aminoacyl groups. The systematic name of this enzyme class is acyl-CoA:16-epivellosimine O-acetyltransferase (cyclizing). This enzyme participates in indole and ipecac alkaloid biosynthesis.

== Structural studies ==
As of late 2007, only one structure has been solved for this class of enzymes, with the PDB accession code 2BGH.
