= Yohimbine =

Chemical compound

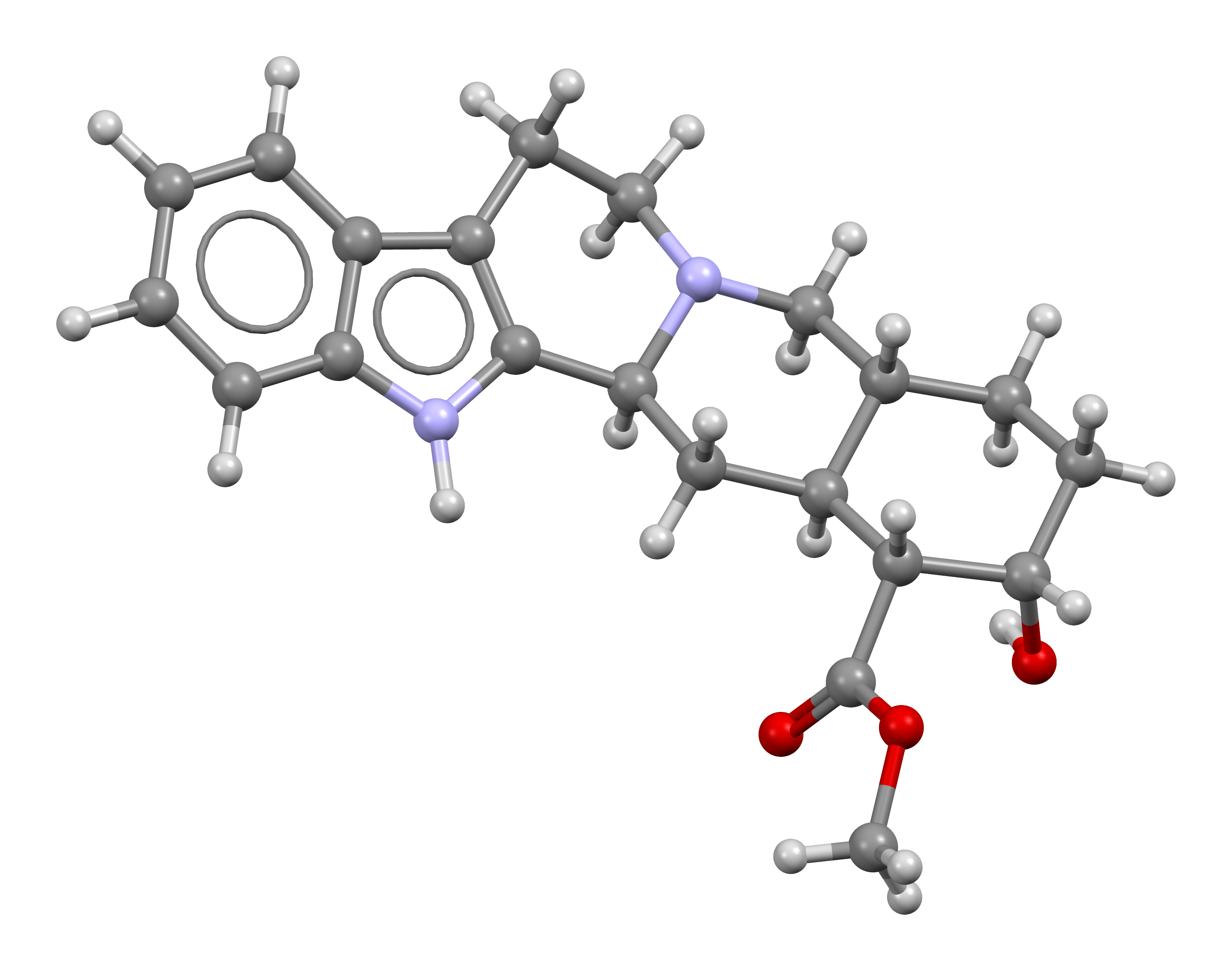

Clinical data
- Pronunciation: /joʊˈhɪmbiːn/
- Other names: Quebrachine
- Routes of administration: By mouth
- Drug class: α_{2}-Adrenergic receptor antagonist
- ATC code: G04BE04 (WHO) QV03AB93 (WHO)

Legal status
- Legal status: AU: S4 (Prescription only); CA: ℞-only; US: Unscheduled

Pharmacokinetic data
- Bioavailability: 7-86% (mean 33%)
- Elimination half-life: 0.25–2.5 hours
- Excretion: Urine (as metabolites)

Identifiers
- IUPAC name: 17α-hydroxyyohimban-16α-carboxylic acid methyl ester
- CAS Number: 146-48-5
- PubChem CID: 8969
- IUPHAR/BPS: 102
- DrugBank: DB01392
- ChemSpider: 8622
- UNII: 2Y49VWD90Q
- KEGG: D08685
- ChEBI: CHEBI:10093
- ChEMBL: ChEMBL15245
- CompTox Dashboard (EPA): DTXSID9040130
- ECHA InfoCard: 100.005.157

Chemical and physical data
- Formula: C_{21}H_{26}N_{2}O_{3}
- Molar mass: 354.450 g·mol^{−1}
- 3D model (JSmol): Interactive image
- SMILES: [H][C@@]15CC[C@H](O)[C@H](C(=O)OC)[C@@]1([H])C[C@@]4([H])c3[nH]c2ccccc2c3CCN4C5
- InChI: InChI=1S/C21H26N2O3/c1-26-21(25)19-15-10-17-20-14(13-4-2-3-5-16(13)22-20)8-9-23(17)11-12(15)6-7-18(19)24/h2-5,12,15,17-19,22,24H,6-11H2,1H3/t12-,15-,17-,18-,19+/m0/s1; Key:BLGXFZZNTVWLAY-SCYLSFHTSA-N

Yohimbine, also known as quebrachine, is an indole alkaloid derived from the bark of the African tree Pausinystalia johimbe (yohimbe) and from the bark of the unrelated South American tree Aspidosperma quebracho-blanco. It is a veterinary drug used to reverse xylazine.

Substances purported to be extracts from the yohimbe tree have been marketed as dietary supplements for various purposes, especially for erectile dysfunction, but they contain highly variable amounts of yohimbine, if any; no published clinical evidence supports their efficacy for treating sexual dysfunction or any disease.

In the United States, it is illegal to market an over-the-counter (OTC) supplement product containing yohimbine as a treatment for any supposed health effect without having approval from the Food and Drug Administration (FDA). In the United Kingdom, yohimbine is an unlicensed drug, rarely and specifically compounded as a "prescription-only medicine", while yohimbine herbal supplements are banned from manufacturing as dangerous substances.

== Uses ==
=== Poison warning and variable content ===
In 2022, the Tennessee Poison Center warned that use of yohimbine supplements may have fatal effects due to the possibility for high, unregulated amounts of yohimbine in over-the-counter (OTC) supplement products. Due to inaccurate product labeling and the potential for serious adverse effects, yohimbine supplements have been banned in many countries. Use of such products has been associated with cardiovascular problems and seizures.

The European Food Safety Authority Panel on Food Additives determined that it was not possible to conclude about the safety or to establish a health-based guidance value for yohimbine in supplement products. They wrote:

Overall the missing information include[s] quantitative data on the composition and specifications of yohimbe bark and its preparations used in food and food supplements covering other alkaloids besides yohimbine, data on the bioavailability of active ingredients from the yohimbe bark extract and data on the toxicity of well specified individual preparations of yohimbe bark and the major yohimbe bark alkaloids, especially regarding subchronic toxicity, genotoxicity and reproductive toxicity.

One study found that samples of brands sold in American brick-and-mortar stores contained highly variable amounts of yohimbine, with some brands of "yohimbe" not containing yohimbine from the P. johimbe tree, and other products containing no yohimbine at all. Labeling claims were often misleading.

In analyses by other laboratories for products sold in the US, in other countries, and on the internet, highly variable content levels of yohimbine were revealed.

Yohimbe sold in markets in West Africa where the tree grows may be adulterated with other species of the genus Pausinystalia, which contain little yohimbine. The amounts of alkaloid found even in genuine P. johimbe bark vary considerably, depending on the source of the bark (roots, stem, branches, height).

=== Sexual dysfunction ===
There is no evidence that yohimbe herbal supplements are effective as an aphrodisiac or as an OTC replacement for sildenafil (Viagra) for erectile dysfunction. Prescriptions for it are rare, and most United States pharmaceutical manufacturers have discontinued production of prescription capsules and tablets. In Canada during 2019, yohimbe products were removed from the market out of concern their use for sexual enhancement, weight loss, or as an exercise aid would pose serious health risks.

It has been studied as a potential treatment for erectile dysfunction, but there is insufficient evidence to rate its effectiveness. Nevertheless, the quantity of yohimbine in dietary supplements, often advertised as promoting sexual function, has been found to overlap with prescription doses of yohimbine.

In the United Kingdom, supplement preparations of yohimbe are banned as introducing a considerable risk for adverse effects. The drug form of yohimbine, called Yohimbine hydrochloride (yohimbine HCl) – which is not licensed as a medicine for any condition – may rarely and specifically be compounded by a pharmacist ("chemist" in the UK) as a prescription-only medicine for treating delayed ejaculation – a formulation that cannot be sold, supplied or advertised as a retail product.

Yohimbine has been used to treat female sexual dysfunction, but there are few reported clinical trials and these do not show it to be better than placebo.

In the United States, "yohimbe" preparations are sold as dietary supplements for enhancing libido, for weight loss and as aids for bodybuilding, but "there is virtually no published research on yohimbe which supports these or any other claims".

=== Other uses ===
Yohimbine has been used to increase peripheral blood flow and to dilate the pupil of the eye.

== Adverse effects ==
Adverse effects of yohimbine in humans at high doses include hypertension (high blood pressure), tachycardia (rapid heartbeat), agitation, hypervigilance, anxiety, tremors, nausea, and urinary frequency. The drug is described as producing a psychoactive state of considerable anxiety along with tenseness, restlessness, and irritability and as being "extremely unpleasant", at least at the assessed doses. In animals, yohimbine likewise produces effects suggestive of severe anxiety. Yohimbine has been used in animals as a model of anxiety in the evaluation of novel anxiolytics.

=== Drug interactions ===
Yohimbine has extensive interactions with prescription drugs, some with severe health consequences, including sudden hypotension, irregular heart rate, heart failure, and death.

Barbiturates and benzodiazepines can reduce the anxiety produced by yohimbine. Conversely, combination with imipramine, which is notably known to act as a norepinephrine reuptake inhibitor, has been reported to augment the restlessness and anxiety of yohimbine and to convert them into panic.

== Pharmacology ==
Yohimbine has high affinity for the α_{2}-adrenergic receptor, moderate affinity for the α_{1} receptor, 5-HT_{1A}, 5-HT_{1B}, 5-HT_{1D}, 5-HT_{1F}, 5-HT_{2B}, and dopamine D_{2} receptors, and weak affinity for the 5-HT_{1E}, 5-HT_{2A}, 5-HT_{5A}, 5-HT_{7}, and dopamine D_{3} receptors. It behaves as an antagonist at α_{1}-adrenergic, α_{2}-adrenergic, 5-HT_{1B}, 5-HT_{1D}, 5-HT_{2A}, 5-HT_{2B}, and dopamine D_{2}, and as a partial agonist at 5-HT_{1A}. Yohimbine interacts with serotonin and dopamine receptors in high concentrations.

Pharmacologic profile
Molecular target	Binding affinity (K_{i} in nanomolar)	Pharmacologic action	Species	Source
SERT	1,000	Inhibitor	Human	Frontal cortex
5-HT_{1A}	346	Partial agonist	Human	Cloned
5-HT_{1B}	19.9	Antagonist	Human	Cloned
5-HT_{1D}	44.3	Antagonist	Human	Cloned
5-HT_{1E}	1,264	Unknown	Human	Cloned
5-HT_{1F}	91.6	Unknown	Human	Cloned
5-HT_{2A}	1,822	Antagonist	Human	Cloned
5-HT_{2B}	43–143.7	Antagonist	Human	Cloned
5-HT_{7}	2,850	Unknown	Human	Cloned
α_{1A}	1,680	Antagonist	Human	Cloned
α_{1B}	1,280	Antagonist	Human	Cloned
α_{1C}	770	Antagonist	Human	Cloned
α_{1D}	557	Antagonist	Human	Cloned
α_{2A}	1.05	Antagonist	Human	Cloned
α_{2B}	1.19	Antagonist	Human	Cloned
α_{2C}	1.19	Antagonist	Human	Cloned
D_{2}	339	Antagonist	Human	Cloned
D_{3}	3,235	Antagonist	Human	Cloned

Yohimbine selectively blocks the pre-synaptic α_{2}-adrenergic receptors. Blockade of post-synaptic α_{2}-adrenergic receptors causes only minor corpus cavernosum smooth muscle relaxation, due to the fact that the majority of adrenoceptors in the corpus cavernosum are of the α_{1} type. Blockade of pre-synaptic α_{2}-adrenergic receptors facilitates the release of several neurotransmitters in the central and peripheral nervous system—thus in the corpus cavernosum—such as nitric oxide and norepinephrine. Whereas nitric oxide released in the corpus cavernosum is the major vasodilator contributing to the erectile process, norepinephrine is the major vasoconstrictor through stimulation of α_{1}-adrenergic receptors on the corpus cavernosum smooth muscle. Under physiologic conditions, however, nitric oxide attenuates norepinephrine vasoconstriction.

Yohimbine binds to the a_{2} adrenergic receptor at a ratio of 40:1 and is the only a_{2} adrenergic receptor antagonist with no imidazoline receptor activity.

== Chemistry ==
Yohimbine is a polycyclic cyclized tryptamine and yohimban derivative.

=== Related compounds ===
Other related compounds include ajmalicine, alstonine, corynanthine, deserpidine, mitragynine, rauwolscine, spegatrine, reserpine, and rescinnamine.

== Natural occurrence ==
=== Pausinystalia johimbe ===
Yohimbine should not be confused with yohimbe but often is. Yohimbe is the common English name for the tree species P. johimbe (also called Corynanthe johimbe) and, by extension, the name of a medicinal preparation made from the bark of that tree, sold as an aphrodisiac. In contrast, yohimbine is a pure alkaloid that can be isolated from yohimbe bark.

Yohimbine is just one of at least 55 indole alkaloids that have been isolated from the bark; and, while it has been described as the most active of these, it constitutes only 15% of the total alkaloid content. Others include rauwolscine, corynanthine and ajmalicine; the bark also contains non-alkaloids about which virtually nothing is known.

Yohimbe, thus a complex mixture, has been studied far less thoroughly than yohimbine, the pure compound. Pharmaceutical grade yohimbine is usually presented as the hydrochloride, which is more soluble.

The traditional source of yohimbine is the bark of the African tree P. johimbe. It has other uses, but the tree is sought out primarily for its bark; in practice, harvesting the bark kills the tree. Tree density is relatively low (average ≈ 4 harvestable trees/hectare). The high demand for medicines based on the bark has led to the tree's over-exploitation. The bark is traded in local markets and, because it is scarce, it is often adulterated with that of other species which contain little yohimbine. The species is becoming endangered.

Around the year 2000, Cameroon was shipping P. johimbe to Europe at the rate of about 100 tonnes annually. Most bark is collected illegally by local people who are paid 150 CFA francs per kilo (about US$0.10 per pound) for delivery of pre-dried bark at the roadside. In practice they confuse and mix it with P. macroceras ("false yohimbe"), a species that contains little yohimbine.

=== Aspidosperma quebracho-blanco ===
Aspidosperma quebracho-blanco is an unrelated tree whose common name is quebracho blanco. It is found in large areas of central South America, particularly the Gran Chaco, where it is often the dominant species in the canopy. It is one of the most widely distributed Argentine arboreal species. Traditionally it was logged for fuel, timber and railway sleepers. While in recent times cattle ranching and soya cultivation have led to considerable habitat loss, and while there is still illegal logging, no shortage of the bark is reported. The tree has not been described as endangered: a few members of the genus Aspidosperma are on the IUCN Red List. but the quebracho blanco species is not one of them.

In its bark an alkaloid is found which was given the name quebrachine. In 1914, two scientific papers claimed quebrachine was chemically identical to yohimbine. This was disputed, and the matter long remained in doubt. However, in 1972, Effler and Effler using modern analytical techniques, including mass spectrometry, UV absorption, IR absorption, and NMR, established that quebrachine and yohimbine are one and the same thing. They wrote:

While it was almost unthinkable in 1914 ... that the same alkaloid was formed in [completely] different plants, recent studies have shown that this is certainly the case for indole alkaloids.

The term 'quebrachine' may be used as a synonym for yohimbine.

Strictly speaking, wrote George Barger, yohimbine should have been given the scientific name quebrachine, seeing that it was first isolated from the quebracho tree and first named in the scientific literature. However, the later work on P. yohimbe was better known.

=== Other plants ===
Yohimbine has also been isolated from other plant genera in the family Apocynaceae including Lochnera (Catharanthus), Rauvolfia, Amsonia, Vallesia and Vinca; from the family Loganiaceae (genera Gelsemium and Strychnos); and from the family Euphorbiaceae (genus Alchornea).

== History ==
Yohimbe (Pausinystalia johimbe) is a tree that grows in western and central Africa; yohimbine was named as originally extracted from the bark of yohimbe in 1896 by Adolph Spiegel (but see § Aspidosperma quebracho-blanco below). Yohimbe is used in folk medicine as an aphrodisiac. In 1900, it attracted scientific interest in Germany, where an initial report claimed that yohimbe exerted a strong aphrodisiacal effect in animals and humans. Attention soon shifted from the plant to its active constituents, particularly yohimbine. In 1943 the correct constitution of yohimbine was proposed by Witkop. Fifteen years later, a team led by Eugene van Tamelen used a 23-step synthesis to become the first persons to achieve the synthesis of yohimbine.

== Society and culture ==
=== Doping in sport ===
There was a case in the World Anti-Doping Agency practice in 2007, when an athlete, who reportedly consumed Yohimbine prior to a given athletic event, was later tested positive for 19-norandrosterone, which is a prohibited substance. However, WADA did not yet list Yohimbine (which can come into a body via an energy drink, also in a form of pre-workout supplement or fat burner) as a prohibited substance, nor did it confirm that its use can increase the endogenous level of anabolic steroids, in particular of 19-norandrostenedione and testosterone.

=== FDA warning letters ===
During the 21st century, the FDA issued multiple warning letters to American manufacturers of yohimbe supplements for making false health claims and interstate marketing of such products as misbranded, unapproved drugs.

== Research ==
=== Post-traumatic stress disorder ===
Yohimbine has been studied as a way to improve the effects of exposure therapy in people with post-traumatic stress disorder (PTSD).

== Veterinary use ==
Yohimbine has been used since the 1970s to reverse the effects of xylazine. A 2011 preliminary study found that intravenous yohimbine has slow elimination and a large distribution in horses. Yohimbine is not commonly used in small animal medicine anymore but is still commonly used in large animal medicine to reverse α_{2} adrenergic receptor agonists such as xylazine.
