= Spegatrine =

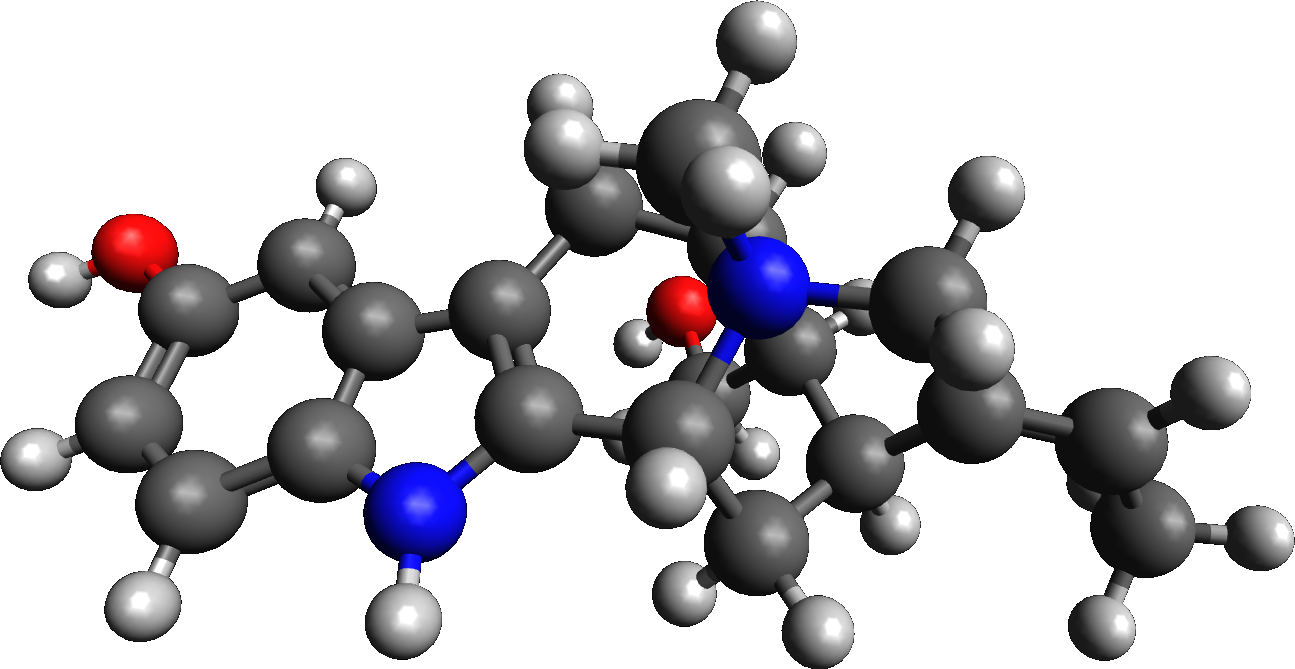

Identifiers
| CAS Number | 47326-53-4 |
| ChemSpider | 4945278 |
| PubChem CID | 6441055 |
- InChI: InChI=1S/C20H24N2O2/c1-3-11-9-22(2)18-8-15-14-6-12(24)4-5-17(14)21-20(15)19(22)7-13(11)16(18)10-23/h3-6,13,16,18-19,21,23H,7-10H2,1-2H3/p+1/b11-3-/t13-,16-,18?,19+,22?/m1/s1 Key: CC=C1C[N+]2(C3CC1C(C2CC4=C3NC5=C4C=C(C=C5)O)CO)C 2.1.5Isomeric SMILES C/C=C\1/C[N+]2([C@H]3C[C@H]1[C@H](C2CC4=C3NC5=C4C=C(C=C5)O)CO)C

Properties
| Chemical formula | C_{20}H_{25}N_{2}O_{2}^{+} |
| Molar mass | 325.425 g/mol |
- Except where otherwise noted, data are given for materials in their standard state (at 25 °C [77 °F], 100 kPa). Infobox references

Spegatrine is an α_{1}- and α_{2}-adrenergic receptor antagonist isolated from Rauvolfia verticillata. Its dimer dispegatrine has greater antagonist affinity for α-adrenergic receptors.

== See also ==
- Ajmalicine
- Corynanthine
- Rauwolscine
- Yohimbine
