= Rauwolscine =

Chemical compound

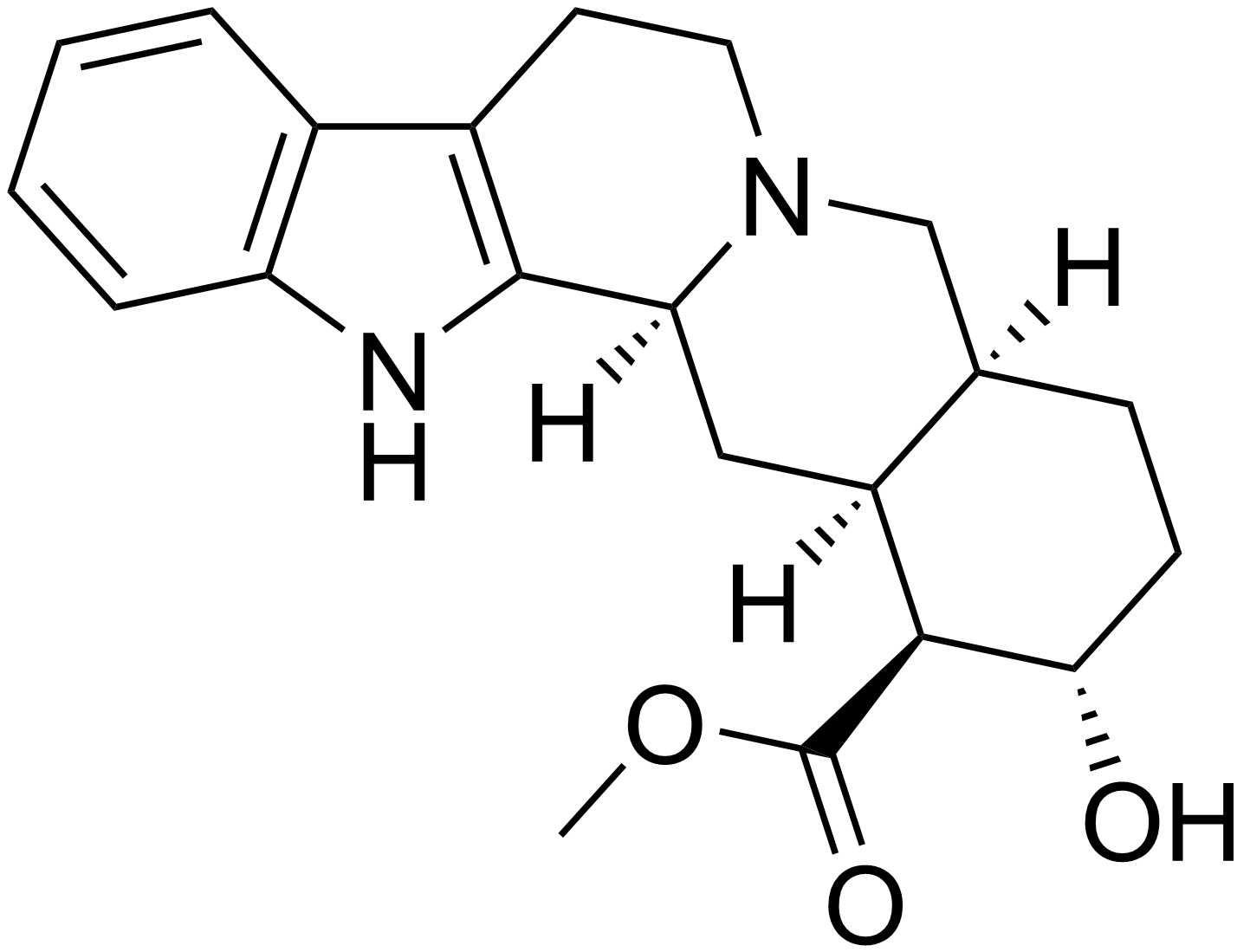

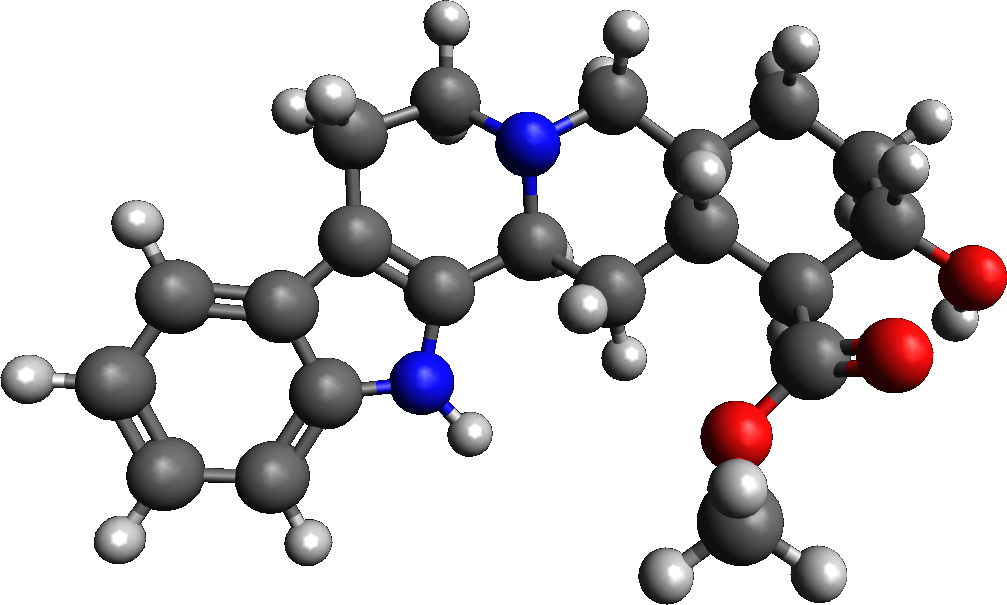

Clinical data
- Other names: Isoyohimbine, α-yohimbine, corynanthidine
- Routes of administration: Oral
- ATC code: none

Legal status
- Legal status: In general: uncontrolled

Identifiers
- IUPAC name: 17α-hydroxy-20α-yohimban-16β-carboxylic acid methyl ester
- CAS Number: 131-03-3 6211-32-1 (HCl)
- PubChem CID: 643606
- IUPHAR/BPS: 136
- ChemSpider: 558737
- UNII: T4LJ7LU45W
- ChEBI: CHEBI:48562
- ChEMBL: ChEMBL10347
- CompTox Dashboard (EPA): DTXSID2045608
- ECHA InfoCard: 100.004.553

Chemical and physical data
- Formula: C_{21}H_{26}N_{2}O_{3}
- Molar mass: 354.450 g·mol^{−1}
- InChI: InChI=1S/C21H26N2O3/c1-26-21(25)19-15-10-17-20-14(13-4-2-3-5-16(13)22-20)8-9-23(17)11-12(15)6-7-18(19)24/h2-5,12,15,17-19,22,24H,6-11H2,1H3/t12-,15+,17+,18+,19+/m1/s1; Key:BLGXFZZNTVWLAY-DIRVCLHFSA-N

Rauwolscine, also known as isoyohimbine, α-yohimbine, and corynanthidine, is an alkaloid found in various species within the genera Rauvolfia and Corynanthe (including Pausinystalia). It is a stereoisomer of yohimbine. Rauwolscine is a central nervous system stimulant, a local anesthetic and a vague aphrodisiac.

Rauwolscine acts predominantly as a α_{2}-adrenergic receptor antagonist. It has also been shown to function as a 5-HT_{1A} receptor partial agonist and 5-HT_{2A} and 5-HT_{2B} receptor antagonist.

== See also ==
- Ajmalicine
- Corynanthine
- Spegatrine
