= Vinorine =

Names
- Other names 22-Norajmala-1,19-dien-17α-yl acetate

Identifiers
CAS Number	34020-07-0
3D model (JSmol)	Interactive image
ChEBI	CHEBI:16791
ChemSpider	4445243
KEGG	C11807
PubChem CID	5281974
UNII	YR8X7R4H9M
- InChI: InChI=1S/C21H22N2O2/c1-3-12-10-23-16-8-13(12)18-17(23)9-21(20(18)25-11(2)24)14-6-4-5-7-15(14)22-19(16)21/h3-7,13,16-18,20H,8-10H2,1-2H3/b12-3-/t13-,16-,17-,18?,20+,21+/m0/s1 Key: CLDVMRAEPFQOSD-WEOXKLFPSA-N
- SMILES: C/C=C\1/CN2[C@H]3C[C@@H]1C4[C@@H]2C[C@]5([C@@H]4OC(=O)C)C3=NC6=CC=CC=C56

Properties
Chemical formula	C_{21}H_{22}N_{2}O_{2}
Molar mass	334.419 g·mol^{−1}
- Except where otherwise noted, data are given for materials in their standard state (at 25 °C [77 °F], 100 kPa). Infobox references

Vinorine is an indole alkaloid isolated from Alstonia. It is produced in trees in the Rauvolfia genus by the enzyme vinorine synthase.
