= Corynanthine =

Chemical compound

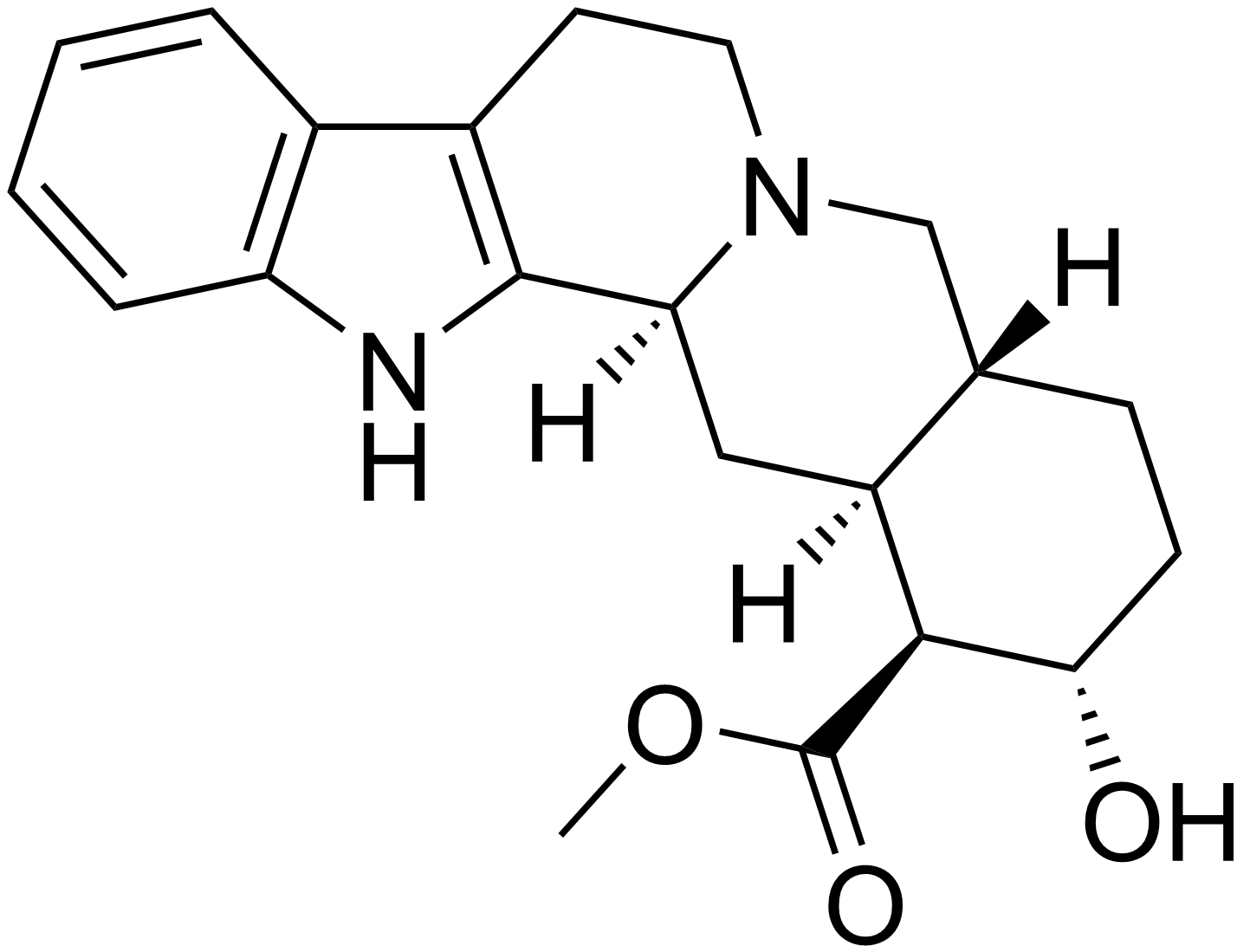

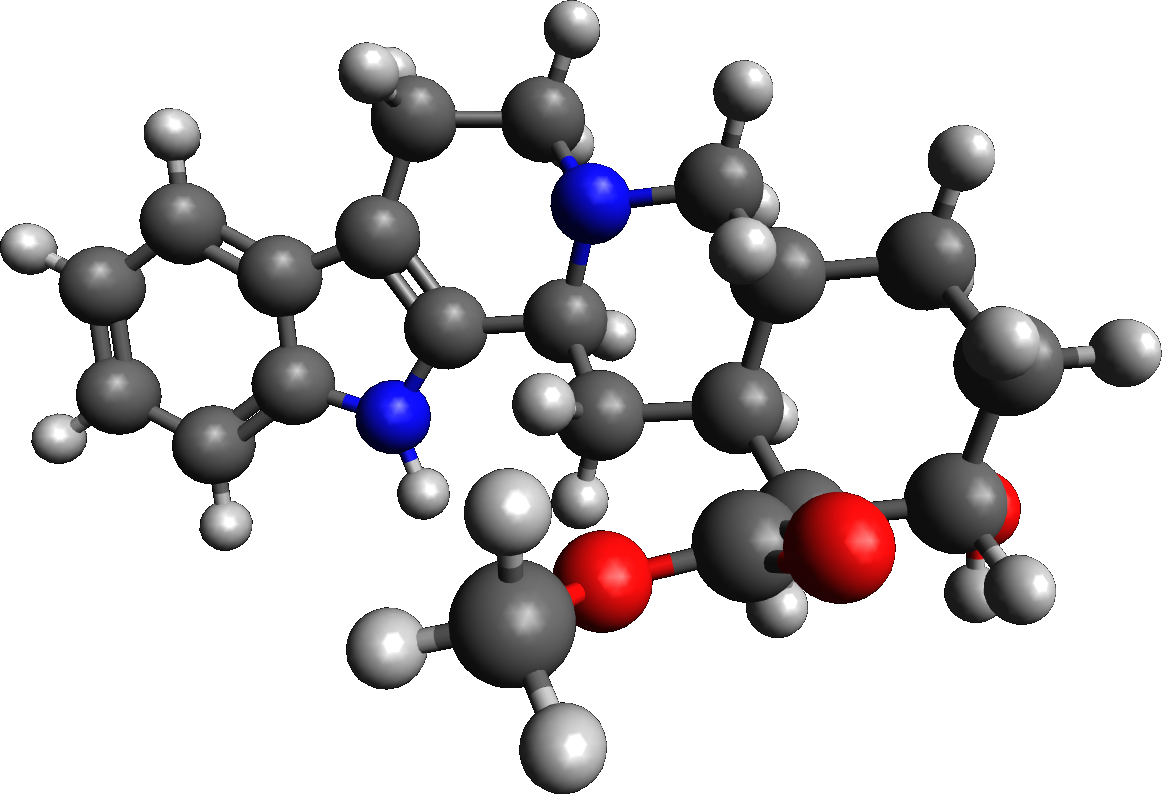

Clinical data
- Other names: Rauhimbine
- Routes of administration: Oral
- ATC code: none

Legal status
- Legal status: In general: uncontrolled

Identifiers
- IUPAC name: (16β,17α)-17-hydroxy-yohimban-16-carboxylic acid methyl ester
- CAS Number: 483-10-3
- PubChem CID: 92766
- IUPHAR/BPS: 5345
- ChemSpider: 83744
- UNII: F5Z7C9RK8U
- CompTox Dashboard (EPA): DTXSID401317915
- ECHA InfoCard: 100.006.901

Chemical and physical data
- Formula: C_{21}H_{26}N_{2}O_{3}
- Molar mass: 354.450 g·mol^{−1}
- 3D model (JSmol): Interactive image
- SMILES: O=C(OC)[C@H]5[C@H]4C[C@H]3c2[nH]c1ccccc1c2CCN3C[C@@H]4CC[C@@H]5O

Corynanthine, also known as rauhimbine, is an alkaloid found in the Rauvolfia and Corynanthe (including Pausinystalia) genera of plants. It is one of the two diastereoisomers of yohimbine, the other being rauwolscine. It is also related to ajmalicine.

Corynanthine acts as an α_{1}-adrenergic and α_{2}-adrenergic receptor antagonist with approximately 10-fold selectivity for the former site over the latter. This is in contrast to yohimbine and rauwolscine which have around 30-fold higher affinity for the α_{2}-adrenergic receptor over the α_{1}-adrenergic receptor. As a result, corynanthine is not a stimulant (or an aphrodisiac for that matter), but a depressant, and likely plays a role in the antihypertensive properties of Rauvolfia extracts. Like yohimbine and rauwolscine, corynanthine has also been shown to possess some activity at serotonin receptors.

== See also ==
- Ajmalicine
- Rauwolscine
- Spegatrine
- Yohimbine
