= Rescinnamine =

Chemical compound

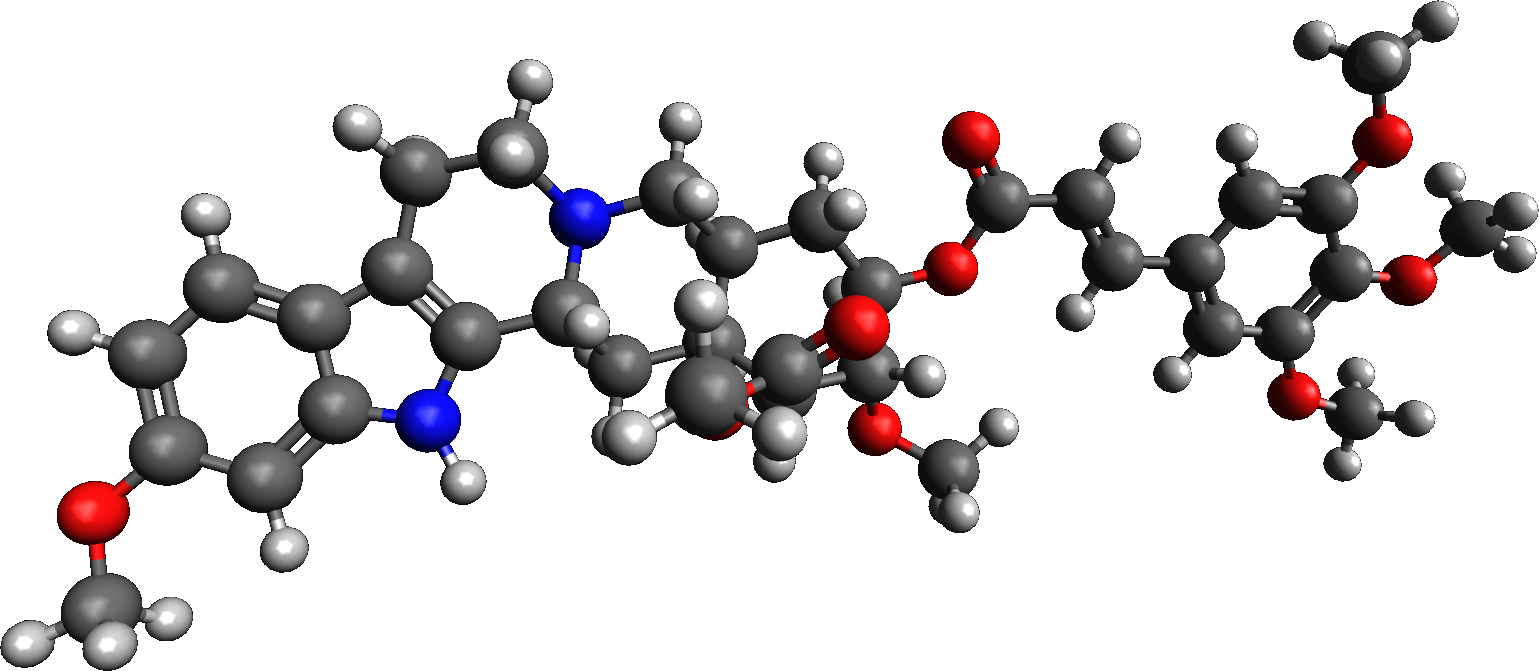

Clinical data
- Trade names: Moderil, Cinnasil, Anaprel
- Other names: methyl (1R,15S,17R,18R,19S,20S)-6,18-dimethoxy-17-{[(2E)-3-(3,4,5-trimethoxyphenyl)prop-2-enoyl]oxy}-3,13-diazapentacyclo[11.8.0.0^{2,10}.0^{4,9}.0^{15,20}]henicosa-2(10),4(9),5,7-tetraene-19-carboxylate
- Routes of administration: By mouth
- ATC code: C02AA01 (WHO)

Legal status
- Legal status: In general: ℞ (Prescription only)

Identifiers
- IUPAC name: methyl (3β,16β,17α,18β,20α)-11,17-dimethoxy-18-{[(2E)-3-(3,4,5-trimethoxyphenyl)prop-2-enoyl]oxy}yohimban-16-carboxylate
- CAS Number: 24815-24-5
- PubChem CID: 5280954
- IUPHAR/BPS: 7098
- DrugBank: DB01180
- ChemSpider: 4444446
- UNII: Q6W1F7DJ2D
- KEGG: D00198
- ChEBI: CHEBI:28572
- ChEMBL: ChEMBL1668
- CompTox Dashboard (EPA): DTXSID3023554
- ECHA InfoCard: 100.042.232

Chemical and physical data
- Formula: C_{35}H_{42}N_{2}O_{9}
- Molar mass: 634.726 g·mol^{−1}
- 3D model (JSmol): Interactive image
- SMILES: [H][C@]26C[C@@H](OC(=O)/C=C/c1cc(OC)c(OC)c(OC)c1)[C@H](OC)[C@@H](C(=O)OC)[C@@]2([H])C[C@]5([H])c4[nH]c3cc(OC)ccc3c4CCN5C6
- InChI: InChI=1S/C35H42N2O9/c1-40-21-8-9-22-23-11-12-37-18-20-15-29(46-30(38)10-7-19-13-27(41-2)33(43-4)28(14-19)42-3)34(44-5)31(35(39)45-6)24(20)17-26(37)32(23)36-25(22)16-21/h7-10,13-14,16,20,24,26,29,31,34,36H,11-12,15,17-18H2,1-6H3/b10-7+/t20-,24+,26-,29-,31+,34+/m1/s1; Key:SZLZWPPUNLXJEA-QEGASFHISA-N

Rescinnamine, known by the brand names Moderil, Cinnasil, and Anaprel, is an angiotensin-converting enzyme inhibitor used as an antihypertensive drug.

It is an indoloquinolizine alkaloid similar to reserpine, obtained from Rauvolfia serpentina and other species of Rauvolfia.
