= Vomilenine =

Names
- IUPAC name [(1R,10S,12R,13E,14R,16S,18R)-13-Ethylidene-14-hydroxy-8,15-diazahexacyclo[14.2.1.0^{1,9}.0^{2,7}.0^{10,15}.0^{12,17}]nonadeca-2,4,6,8-tetraen-18-yl] acetate
- Other names 21α-Hydroxy-22-norajmala-1,19-dien-17α-yl acetate

Identifiers
CAS Number	6880-50-8
3D model (JSmol)	Interactive image
ChEBI	CHEBI:16408
ChemSpider	10128107
KEGG	C01761
PubChem CID	11953806
UNII	C9L2GUG8W2
CompTox Dashboard (EPA)	DTXSID601046419
- InChI: InChI=1S/C21H22N2O3/c1-3-11-12-8-15-18-21(13-6-4-5-7-14(13)22-18)9-16(23(15)20(11)25)17(12)19(21)26-10(2)24/h3-7,12,15-17,19-20,25H,8-9H2,1-2H3/b11-3+/t12-,15-,16-,17?,19+,20+,21+/m0/s1 Key: BERYBAUEDCRDKM-FDHUPVAHSA-N
- SMILES: C/C=C/1\[C@@H]2C[C@H]3C4=NC5=CC=CC=C5[C@]46C[C@@H](C2[C@H]6OC(=O)C)N3[C@@H]1O

Properties
Chemical formula	C_{21}H_{22}N_{2}O_{3}
Molar mass	350.418 g·mol^{−1}
- Except where otherwise noted, data are given for materials in their standard state (at 25 °C [77 °F], 100 kPa). Infobox references

Vomilenine is an alkaloid that is an intermediate chemical in the biosynthesis of ajmaline.
