= Deserpidine =

Antihypertensive drug

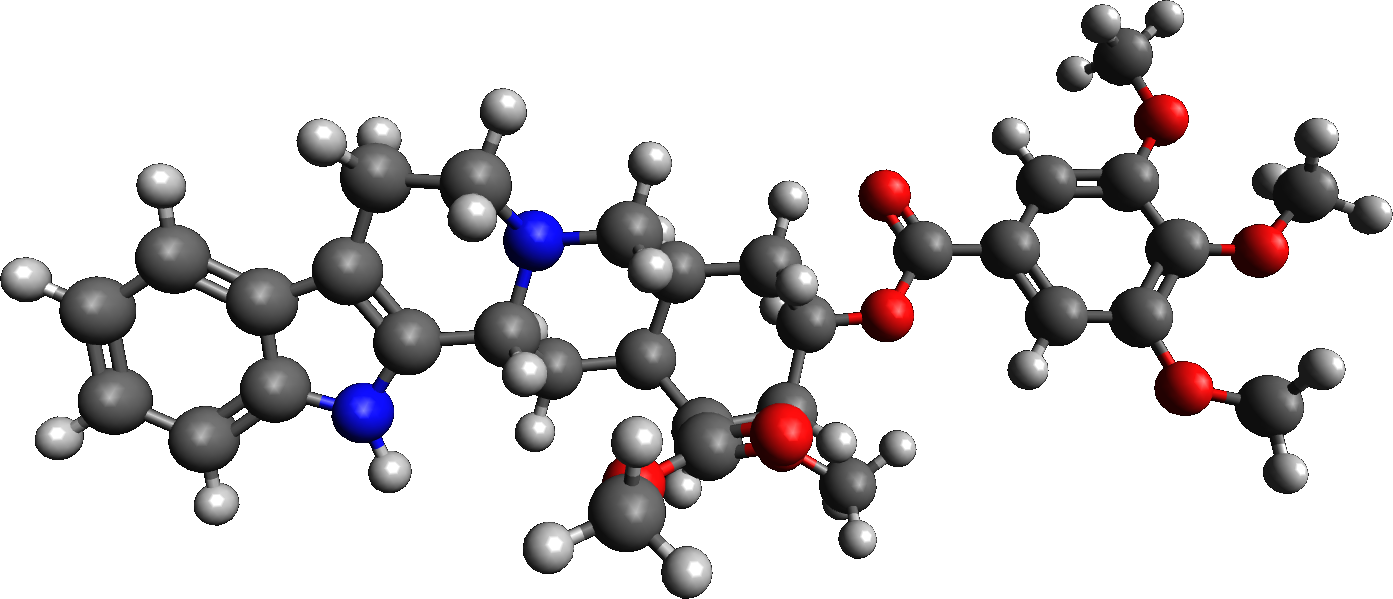

Names
- IUPAC name Methyl 17α-methoxy-18β-[(3,4,5-trimethoxybenzoyl)oxy]-3β,20α-yohimban-16β-carboxylate
- Systematic IUPAC name Methyl (1S,2R,4R,4aS,13bR,14aS)-2-methoxy-3-[(3,4,5-trimethoxybenzoyl)oxy]-1,2,3,4,4a,5,7,8,13,13b,14,14a-dodecahydroindolo[2′,3′:3,4]pyrido[1,2-b]isoquinoline-1-carboxylate

Identifiers
CAS Number	131-01-1
3D model (JSmol)	Interactive image
ChEBI	CHEBI:27478
ChEMBL	ChEMBL1200515
ChemSpider	8232
DrugBank	DB01089
ECHA InfoCard	100.004.551
IUPHAR/BPS	7064
KEGG	D08194
PubChem CID	8550
UNII	9016E3VB47
CompTox Dashboard (EPA)	DTXSID8020383
- InChI: InChI=1S/C32H38N2O8/c1-37-24-12-17(13-25(38-2)29(24)39-3)31(35)42-26-14-18-16-34-11-10-20-19-8-6-7-9-22(19)33-28(20)23(34)15-21(18)27(30(26)40-4)32(36)41-5/h6-9,12-13,18,21,23,26-27,30,33H,10-11,14-16H2,1-5H3/t18-,21+,23-,26-,27+,30+/m1/s1 Key: CVBMAZKKCSYWQR-WCGOZPBSSA-N; InChI=1/C32H38N2O8/c1-37-24-12-17(13-25(38-2)29(24)39-3)31(35)42-26-14-18-16-34-11-10-20-19-8-6-7-9-22(19)33-28(20)23(34)15-21(18)27(30(26)40-4)32(36)41-5/h6-9,12-13,18,21,23,26-27,30,33H,10-11,14-16H2,1-5H3/t18-,21+,23-,26-,27+,30+/m1/s1 Key: CVBMAZKKCSYWQR-WCGOZPBSBL
- SMILES: O=C(OC)[C@H]6[C@H]4C[C@@H]3c2[nH]c1ccccc1c2CCN3C[C@H]4C[C@@H](OC(=O)c5cc(OC)c(OC)c(OC)c5)[C@@H]6OC

Properties
Chemical formula	C_{32}H_{38}N_{2}O_{8}
Molar mass	578.662 g·mol^{−1}

Pharmacology
ATC code	C02AA05 (WHO)
- Except where otherwise noted, data are given for materials in their standard state (at 25 °C [77 °F], 100 kPa). verify (what is ?) Infobox references

Deserpidine (INN) or reserpidine (USAN) is an antihypertensive drug structurally related to reserpine differing only by the absence of a methoxy group on the indole ring. It is a naturally occurring alkaloid from Rauvolfia spp.
