= Ajmalicine =

Chemical compound

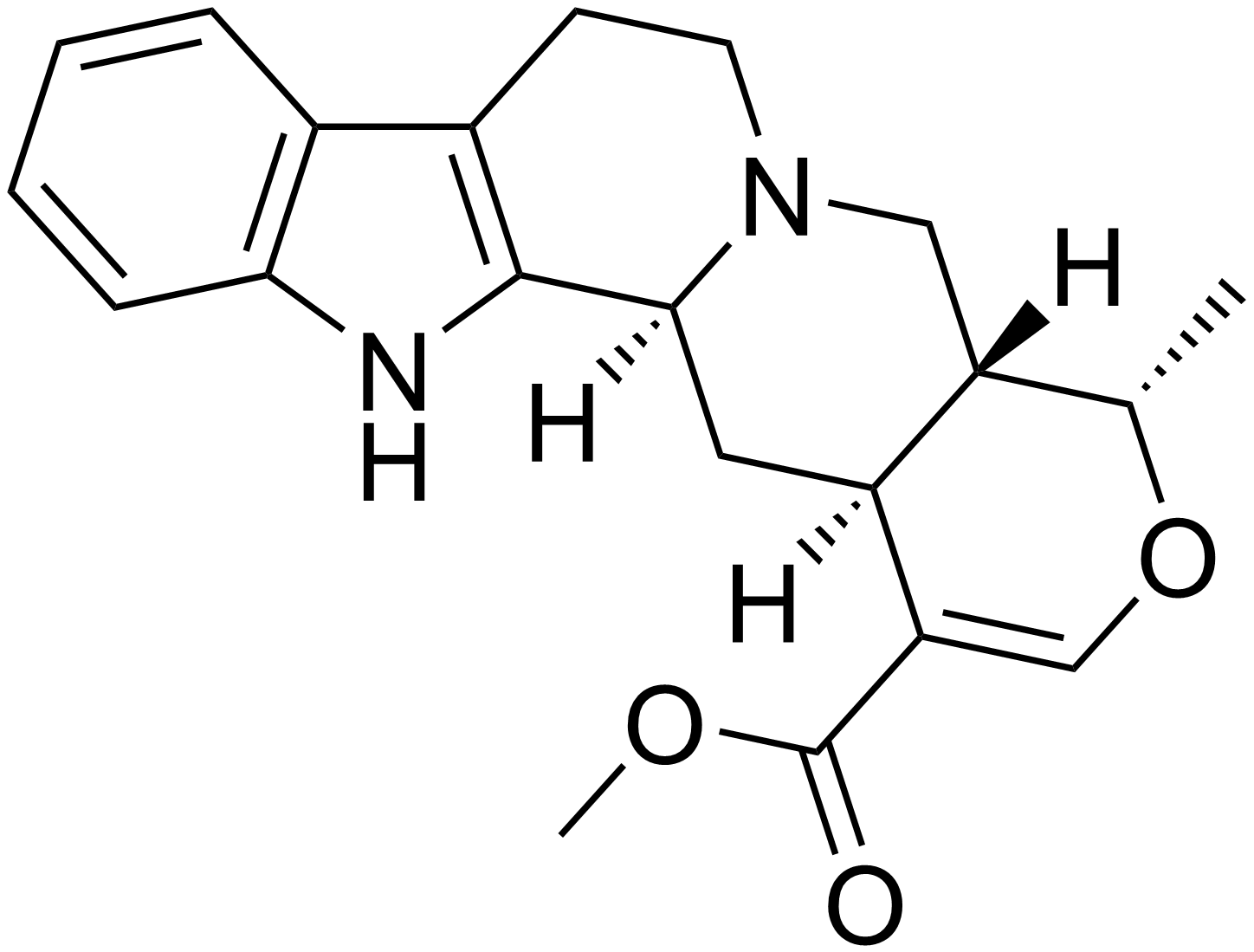

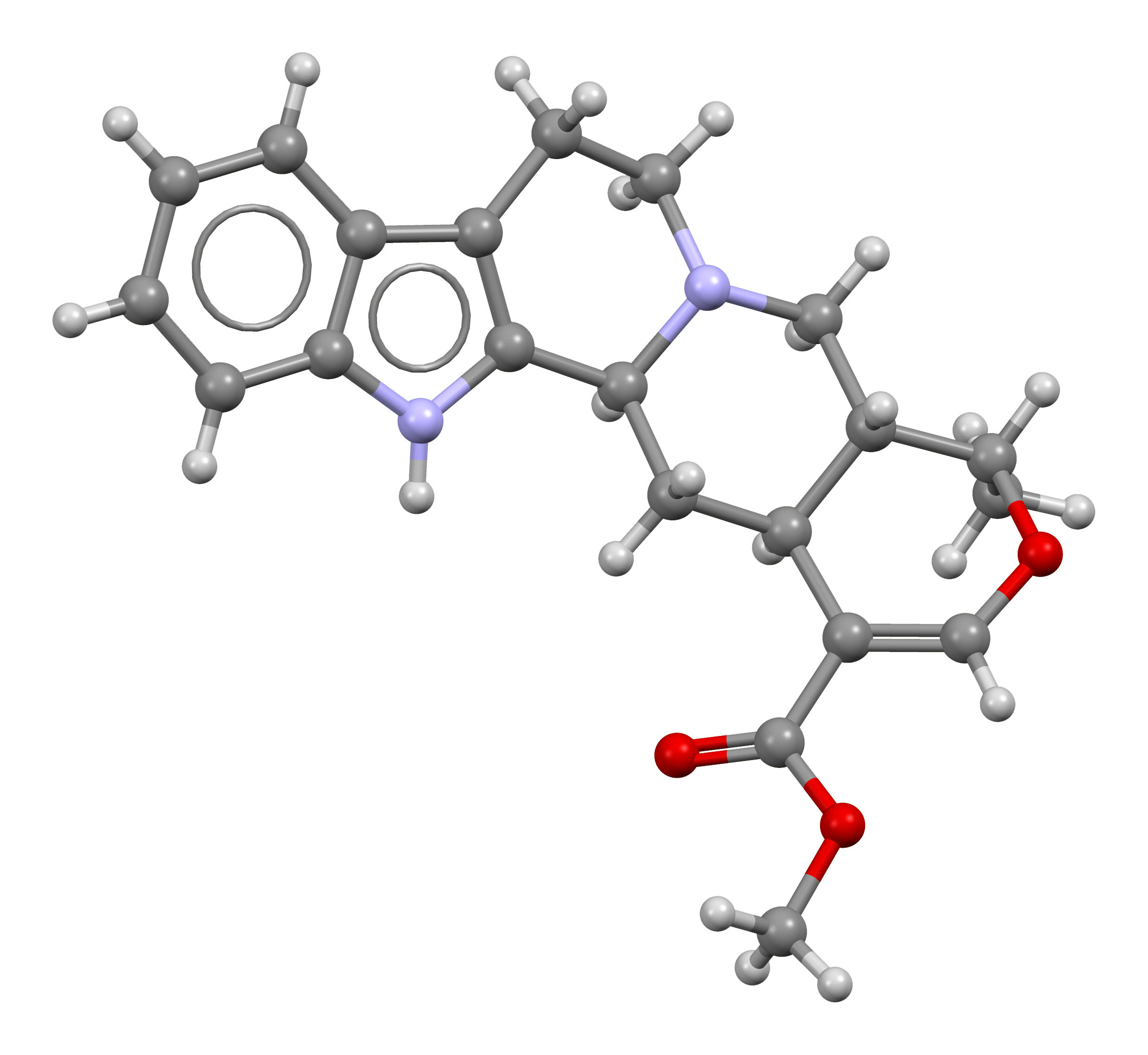

Clinical data
- Routes of administration: Oral
- ATC code: none

Legal status
- Legal status: In general: ℞ (Prescription only)

Identifiers
- IUPAC name: (19α)-16,17-didehydro- 19-methyloxayohimban- 16-carboxylic acid methyl ester
- CAS Number: 483-04-5
- PubChem CID: 251561
- ChemSpider: 390541
- UNII: 4QJL8OX71Z
- ChEBI: CHEBI:2524
- ChEMBL: ChEMBL123325
- CompTox Dashboard (EPA): DTXSID60904151
- ECHA InfoCard: 100.006.900

Chemical and physical data
- Formula: C_{21}H_{24}N_{2}O_{3}
- Molar mass: 352.434 g·mol^{−1}
- 3D model (JSmol): Interactive image
- Melting point: 262.5 to 263 °C (504.5 to 505.4 °F)
- SMILES: O=C(OC)\C4=C\OC(C5CN3CCc1c([nH]c2ccccc12)C3CC45)C
- InChI: InChI=1S/C21H24N2O3/c1-12-16-10-23-8-7-14-13-5-3-4-6-18(13)22-20(14)19(23)9-15(16)17(11-26-12)21(24)25-2/h3-6,11-12,15-16,19,22H,7-10H2,1-2H3/t12-,15-,16+,19-/m0/s1; Key:GRTOGORTSDXSFK-XJTZBENFSA-N

Ajmalicine, also known as δ-yohimbine or raubasine, is an antihypertensive drug used in the treatment of high blood pressure. It has been marketed under numerous brand names including Card-Lamuran, Circolene, Cristanyl, Duxil, Duxor, Hydroxysarpon, Iskedyl, Isosarpan, Isquebral, Lamuran, Melanex, Raunatin, Saltucin Co, Salvalion, and Sarpan. It is an alkaloid found naturally in various plants such as Rauvolfia spp., Catharanthus roseus, and Mitragyna speciosa.

Ajmalicine is structurally related to yohimbine, rauwolscine, and other yohimban derivatives. Like corynanthine, it acts as a α_{1}-adrenergic receptor antagonist with preferential actions over α_{2}-adrenergic receptors, underlying its hypotensive rather than hypertensive effects.

Additionally, it is a very strong inhibitor of the CYP2D6 liver enzyme, which is responsible for the breakdown of many drugs. Its binding affinity for this enzyme is 3.30 nM.

== Biosynthesis ==
Two moieties are involved in the biosynthesis of ajmalicine, the terpenoid moiety and the indole moiety. The terpenoid moiety is synthesized by the MEP pathway. The MEP pathway starts with pyruvate and D-glyceraldehyde-3-phosphate, followed by the involvement of DXS, DXR, MCT, MECS, HDS, and HDR genes. This results in isopentenyl diphosphate and dimethylallyl diphosphate which are then synthesized into secologanin. The indole moiety is brought about by the indole pathway, where tryptophan decarboxylase (TDC) catalyzes the formation of tryptamine from tryptophan. Strictosidine synthase (STR) then catalyzes the formation of strictosidine from the intermediates of the previous pathways. Strictosidine is the common precursor for all terpenoid indole alkaloids. Ajmalicine is finally synthesized under catalysis of strictosidine glucosidase (SGD).

Biosynthetic pathway of ajmalicine. Reconstruction of figure 1 in Chang, K. (2014).

== See also ==
- Corynanthine
- Rauwolscine
- Spegatrine
- Yohimbine
