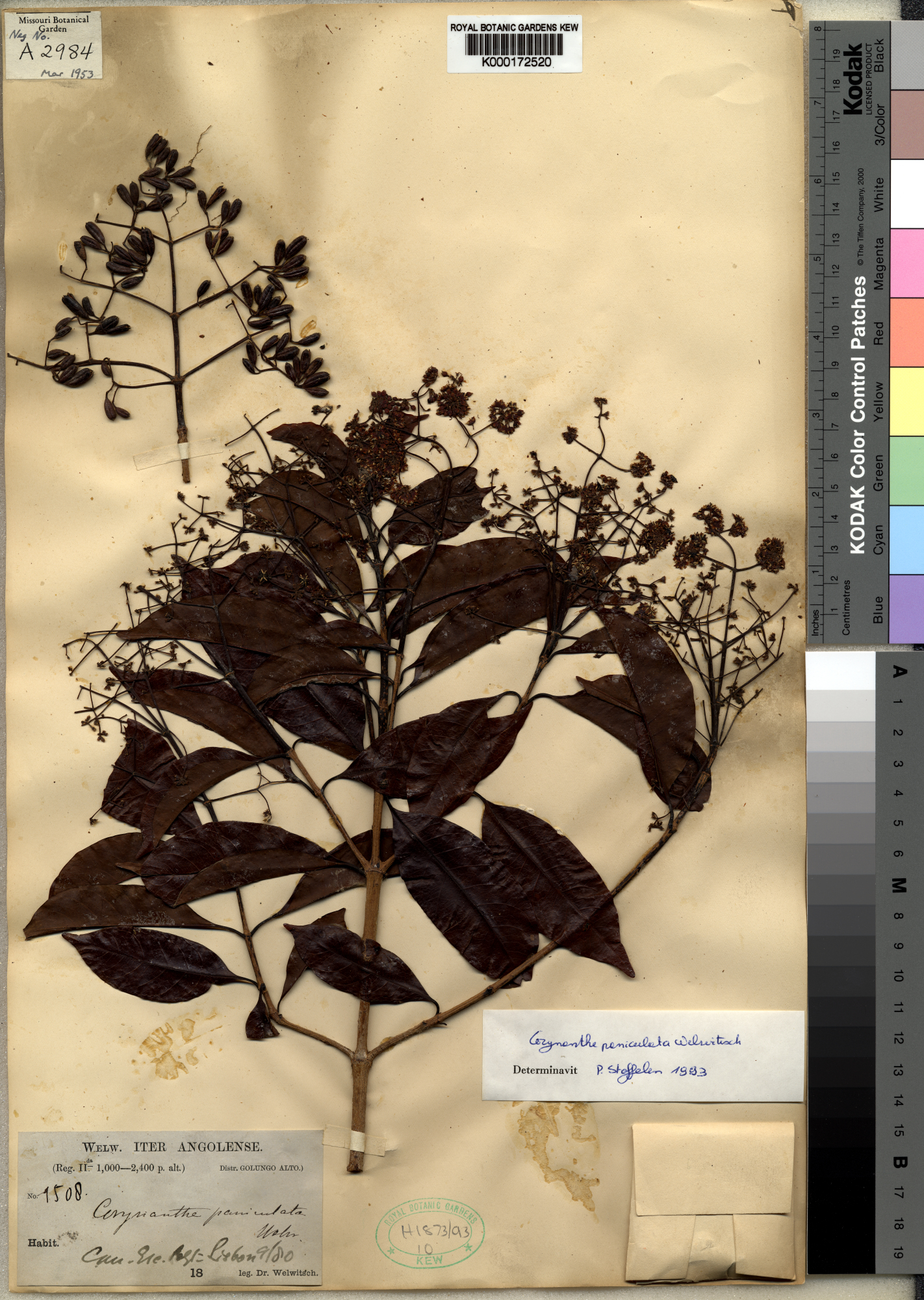
- Corynanthe paniculata

Scientific classification
- Kingdom: Plantae
- Clade: Tracheophytes
- Clade: Angiosperms
- Clade: Eudicots
- Clade: Asterids
- Order: Gentianales
- Family: Rubiaceae
- Subfamily: Cinchonoideae
- Tribe: Naucleeae
- Genus: Corynanthe; Welw.

Type species
- Corynanthe paniculata Welw.

Synonyms
- Pausinystalia Pierre ex Beille; Pseudocinchona A.Chev. ex Perrot

= Corynanthe =

Genus of plants

Corynanthe is a genus of flowering plants in the family Rubiaceae.

== Species ==
As of June 2021, Plants of the World Online accepted the following species, including those formerly placed in the genus Pausinystalia.

- Corynanthe brachythyrsus K.Schum.
- Corynanthe johimbe K.Schum.
- Corynanthe lane-poolei Hutch.
- Corynanthe macroceras K.Schum.
- Corynanthe mayumbensis (R.D.Good) N.Hallé
- Corynanthe pachyceras K.Schum.
- Corynanthe paniculata Welw.
- Corynanthe talbotii (Wernham) Å.Krüger & Löfstrand
