= Rauvolfia micrantha =

Scientific classification
- Kingdom: Plantae
- Clade: Tracheophytes
- Clade: Angiosperms
- Clade: Eudicots
- Clade: Asterids
- Order: Gentianales
- Family: Apocynaceae
- Genus: Rauvolfia
- Species: R. micrantha

Binomial name
- Rauvolfia micrantha Hook.f.

Synonyms
- Rauvolfia indosinensis Pichon; Rauvolfia membranifolia Kerr; Rauvolfia vietnamensis Lý

Species of flowering plant

Rauvolfia micrantha, the small-flowered snakeroot, is a plant that is indigenous to southwestern India, southern Thailand, and Vietnam. It has a woody, shrub-like appearance and attractive flowers.

== Distribution and habitat ==
The general habitat of plants in the genus Rauvolfia is semi-evergreen and evergreen forest distributed along tropical areas of Asia, Africa, and America. The plant is endemic to the evergreen forest of the Tinnevelly and Travancore hills in the Indian Western Ghats (states of Kerala and Tamil Nadu. It flowers and fruits between March and October.

== Conservation ==
Rauvolfia micrantha is a critically endangered plant. The species has scanty distribution in the wild due to habitat degradation, fragmentation of population and narrow environmental niche. Efforts toward its conservation involve cryopreservation of seeds and in-vitro methods. Organogenesisis the standardized protocol for regeneration of R. micrantha in culture. Nodes of the plant are used as explants. Cryopreservation of the seeds has proven to be slightly difficult. The seeds of R. micrantha are of intermediate type and hence require strict conditions during this process.

== Morphology, flowers and fruits ==
The plant is a perennial woody shrub that grows at elevations up to about 600 m (2,000 ft). Branches are slender and glabrous (having no trichomes or "hair"). The leaves are approximately 8–13 cm (3–5 in) x 2–5 cm (0.8–2 in), elliptic, membranous, abruptly acuminate at both ends; petiole 1 cm long. Flowers are arranged in axillary long-peduncled congested cymes; sepals are 1.5 mm (0.059 in) long, triangular, acute and basely connate. The corolla is colored white with reddish color at throat, and is about 8 mm (0.31 in) long, glabrous, with acute ovate lobes. Capsule is 7 mm (0.28 in) x 5 mm (0.20 in), ovoid acute, and glabrous. Fruits are obliquely ovate and pointed.

Rauvolfia micrantha is related to the snakeroot plant (Rauvolfia serpentina) which is used as a traditional herbal medicine. However, isoenzyme analysis reveals that it is more closely related to Rauvolfia tetraphylla L.

== Reproduction ==
Flowering reaches its peak in the month of May and anthesis occurs between 5:00 am and 8:30 am with a peak at 7:00 am. Dehiscence occurs between 6:00 am and 10:30 am on the day of the anthesis. The stigmas are receptive the day before anthesis, however, become increasingly receptive on the day of anthesis. The major insect pollinators included Apis florea (honeybee), Oecophylla smargadina (red ant), Tetragonula iridipennis (pollen bee) and butterflies such as Pachliopta aristolochaea, Pachliopta hector, Delias eucharis and Euploea core.

=== Alkaloids ===
Hairy root induction of the plant is achieved in culture by using infection with Agrobacterium rhizogenes strains.

- Hairy root: ajmaline, ajmalacine, reserpine, reserpiline, sarpagine, and serpentine
- Root bark: aunamine and neosarpagine

Other nutrients and chemicals in the plant include phenolics, flavonoids, vitamins and carotenoids. The extracts also had antioxidant properties in vitro.

=== Uses ===
The plant is used as a substitute for R. serpentina in Ayurvedic practices in Kerala, India for nervous disorders such as insomnia and insanity.
