= Perakine reductase =

Identifiers
- EC no.: 1.1.1.317

Databases
- IntEnz: IntEnz view
- BRENDA: BRENDA entry
- ExPASy: NiceZyme view
- KEGG: KEGG entry
- MetaCyc: metabolic pathway
- PRIAM: profile
- PDB structures: RCSB PDB PDBe PDBsum
Search
- PMC: articles
- PubMed: articles
- NCBI: proteins

Perakine reductase (EC 1.1.1.317) is an enzyme with systematic name raucaffrinoline:NADP^{+} oxidoreductase. This enzyme catalyses the following chemical reaction:

raucaffrinoline
+ NADP^{+}
H^{+}
H^{+}
perakine
+ NADPH

The biosynthesis of raucaffrinoline from perakine is a side route of the ajmaline biosynthesis pathway.
