= Raucaffrinoline =

Names
- IUPAC name [(1R,10S,12S,13R,14S,16S,18R)-13-(hydroxymethyl)-14-methyl-8,15-diazahexacyclo[14.2.1.0^{1,9}.0^{2,7}.0^{10,15}.0^{12,17}]nonadeca-2,4,6,8-tetraen-18-yl] acetate

Identifiers
CAS Number	36285-11-7
3D model (JSmol)	Interactive image
ChEBI	CHEBI:63167
ChemSpider	26332998
KEGG	C19931
PubChem CID	56927714
UNII	3DFF5QDK46
- InChI: InChI=1S/C21H24N2O3/c1-10-13(9-24)12-7-16-19-21(14-5-3-4-6-15(14)22-19)8-17(23(10)16)18(12)20(21)26-11(2)25/h3-6,10,12-13,16-18,20,24H,7-9H2,1-2H3/t10-,12-,13-,16-,17-,18?,20+,21+/m0/s1 Key: XIMPCXFLDSKALH-FXRWJBKJSA-N
- SMILES: C[C@H]1[C@@H]([C@@H]2C[C@@H]3N1[C@@H]4C2[C@H]([C@@]5(C4)C3=NC6=CC=CC=C56)OC(=O)C)CO

Properties
Chemical formula	C_{21}H_{24}N_{2}O_{3}
Molar mass	352.434 g·mol^{−1}
- Except where otherwise noted, data are given for materials in their standard state (at 25 °C [77 °F], 100 kPa). Infobox references

Raucaffrinoline is an indole alkaloid isolated from the leaves of various plants in the Rauvolfia family, such as Rauvolfia yunnanensis.
