= C21H22N2O3 =

The molecular formula C_{21}H_{22}N_{2}O_{3} (molar mass: 350.41 g/mol, exact mass: 350.1630 u) may refer to:

- NNC-711
- Perakine
- Vomilenine
