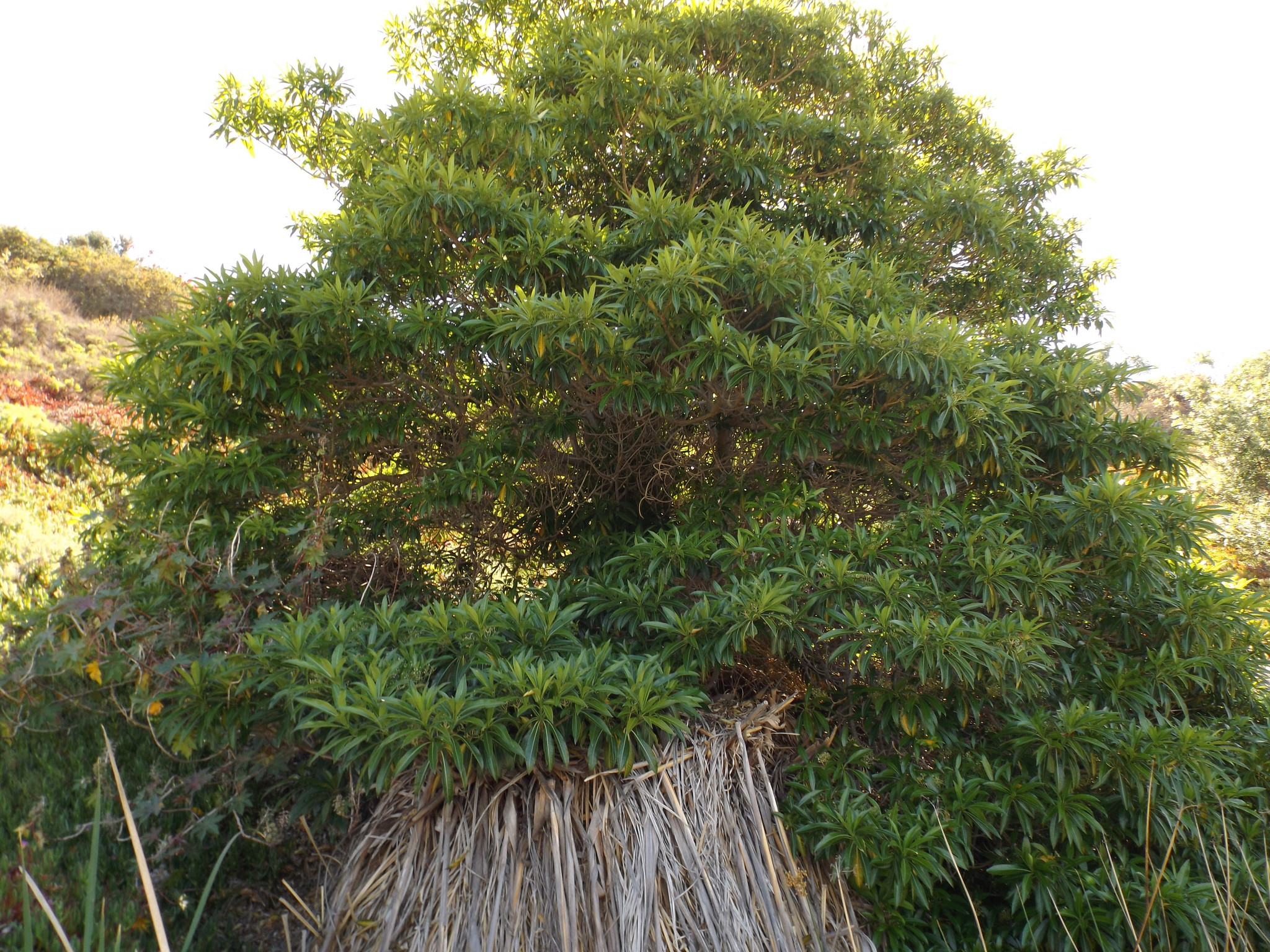
- In Newport Beach, California

Conservation status
- Least Concern (IUCN 3.1)

Scientific classification
- Kingdom: Plantae
- Clade: Embryophytes
- Clade: Tracheophytes
- Clade: Spermatophytes
- Clade: Angiosperms
- Clade: Eudicots
- Clade: Asterids
- Order: Gentianales
- Family: Apocynaceae
- Genus: Rauvolfia
- Species: R. sumatrana

Binomial name
- Rauvolfia sumatrana Jack

Synonyms
- Cyrtosiphonia madurensis Teijsm. & Binn.; Cyrtosiphonia reflexa (Teijsm. & Binn.) Miq.; Cyrtosiphonia spectabilis Miq.; Cyrtosiphonia sumatrana (Jack) Miq.; Rauvolfia blumeana Valeton ex Koord.-Schum.; Rauvolfia madurensis (Teijsm. & Binn.) Burck ex Koord.-Schum.; Rauvolfia palawanensis Elmer; Rauvolfia reflexa Teijsm. & Binn.; Rauvolfia samarensis Merr.; Rauvolfia spectabilis (Miq.) Boerl.

= Rauvolfia sumatrana =

Species of plant

Rauvolfia sumatrana is a tree in the family Apocynaceae.

== Description ==
Rauvolfia sumatrana grows up to 27 m (90 ft) tall, with a trunk diameter of up to 43 cm (17 in). The bark is grey, yellowish grey, greenish yellow or brown. Inflorescences bear up to 35 or more flowers. The flowers feature a white corolla. The fruits are bluish black or purplish black when ripe, round, up to 2.1 cm (0.8 in) in diameter.

== Distribution and habitat ==
Rauvolfia sumatrana is native to China, India, Burma, Thailand, Vietnam and Malesia. It is found in a variety of habitats, mostly lowland.
