= Rauvolfia mannii =

Conservation status
- Least Concern (IUCN 3.1)

Scientific classification
- Kingdom: Plantae
- Clade: Tracheophytes
- Clade: Angiosperms
- Clade: Eudicots
- Clade: Asterids
- Order: Gentianales
- Family: Apocynaceae
- Genus: Rauvolfia
- Species: R. mannii

Binomial name
- Rauvolfia mannii Stapf

Synonyms
- Rauvolfia cardiocarpa K.Schum; Rauvolfia longiacuminata De Wild. & T.Durand; Rauvolfia preussii K.Schum

Species of plant

Rauvolfia mannii is a plant in the family Apocynaceae, native to Africa.

== Description ==
Rauvolfia mannii grows as a shrub or small tree up to 8 m (26 ft) tall. Its fragrant flowers feature white to pink or red-brown, or yellow corolla lobes. The plant has been used as arrow poison.

== Distribution and habitat ==
Rauvolfia mannii is native to central Africa. Its habitat is forests from sea level to 2,500 m (8,200 ft) altitude.
