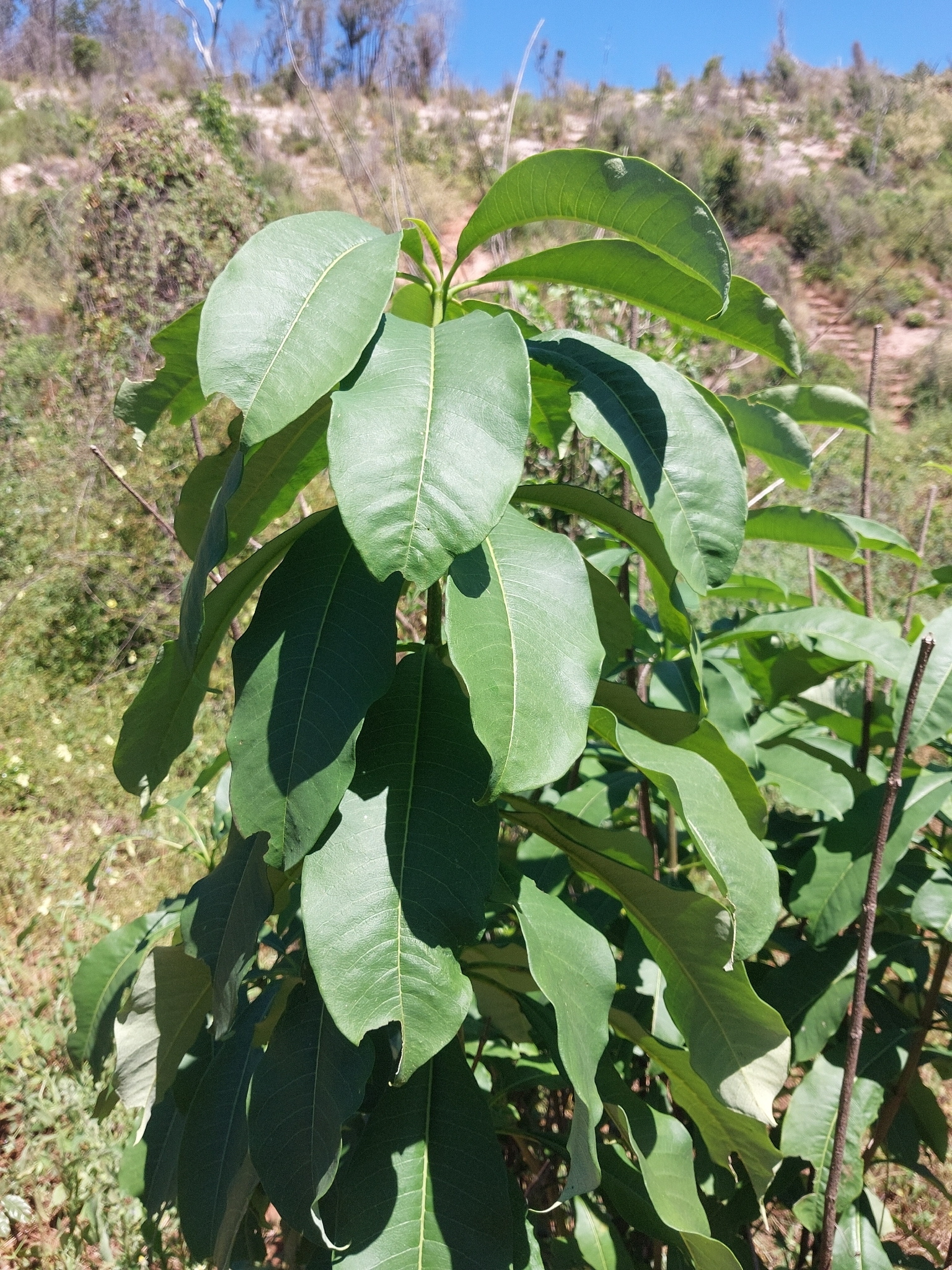
- In Madagascar

Conservation status
- Least Concern (IUCN 3.1)

Scientific classification
- Kingdom: Plantae
- Clade: Embryophytes
- Clade: Tracheophytes
- Clade: Spermatophytes
- Clade: Angiosperms
- Clade: Eudicots
- Clade: Asterids
- Order: Gentianales
- Family: Apocynaceae
- Genus: Rauvolfia
- Species: R. media

Binomial name
- Rauvolfia media Pichon

Synonyms
- Rauvolfia concolor Pichon; Rauvolfia confertiflora Pichon

= Rauvolfia media =

Species of plant

Rauvolfia media grows as a shrub or small tree up to 10 m (30 ft) tall. Its fragrant flowers feature white to dull yellow corolla lobes. Its habitat is dry forest and savanna from sea level to 800 m (2,600 ft) altitude. Extracts of the plant, mixed with food, have been used to poison pest animals. Rauvolfia media is native to Madagascar, the Comoros and Mayotte.
