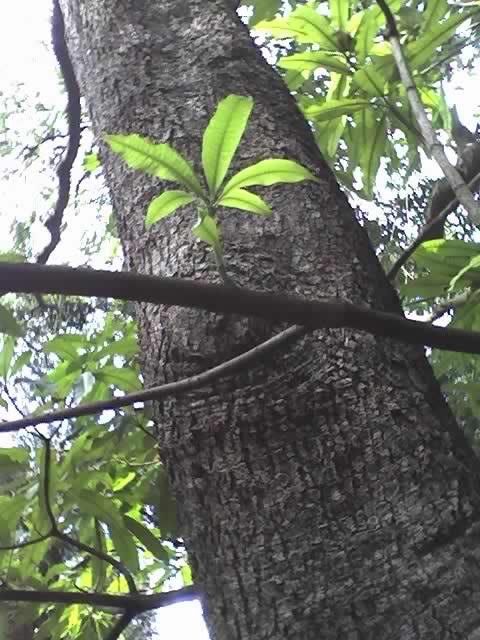
- Rauvolfia afra stem and leaves

Conservation status
- Least Concern (IUCN 3.1)

Scientific classification
- Kingdom: Plantae
- Clade: Tracheophytes
- Clade: Angiosperms
- Clade: Eudicots
- Clade: Asterids
- Order: Gentianales
- Family: Apocynaceae
- Genus: Rauvolfia
- Species: R. afra

Binomial name
- Rauvolfia afra Sond. (emended)

Synonyms
- Rauvolfia afra var. natalensis Stapf ex Hiern; Rauvolfia goetzei Stapf; Rauvolfia gonioclada K.Schum. ex Stapf; Rauvolfia inebrians K.Schum.; Rauvolfia mayombensis Pellegr.; Rauvolfia natalensis Sond.; Rauvolfia obliquinervis Stapf; Rauvolfia ochrosioides K.Schum.; Rauvolfia oxyphylla Stapf; Rauvolfia tchibangensis Pellegr.; Rauvolfia verticillata A.Chev.; Rauvolfia welwitschii Stapf; Rauvolfia caffra Sond.

= Rauvolfia afra =

Quinine tree

Species of flowering plant

Rauvolfia afra is a tree in the family Apocynaceae. It is commonly known as the quinine tree. These trees are distributed from the Eastern Cape of South Africa to tropical Africa and are found in low-lying forests near rivers and streams, or on floodplains.

== Taxonomy ==
The original etymology of the species name caffra is related to kaffir, an ethnic slur used towards black people in Africa. At the July 2024 International Botanical Congress, a vote was held with the result that "caffra" related names will be amended to afra related ones, with this being implemented at the end of July 2024.

== Gallery ==
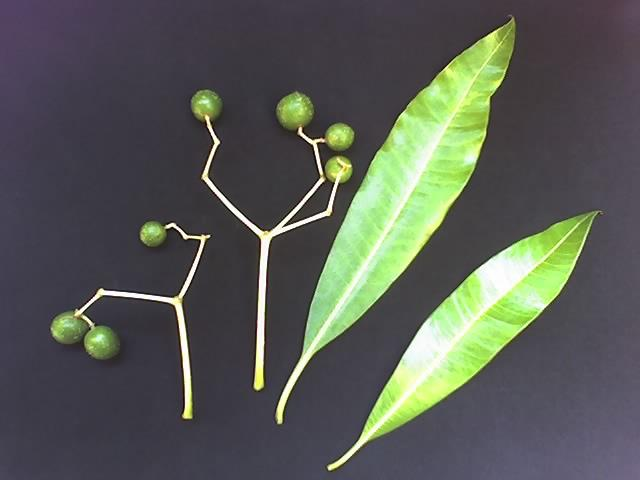
Fruit and leaves

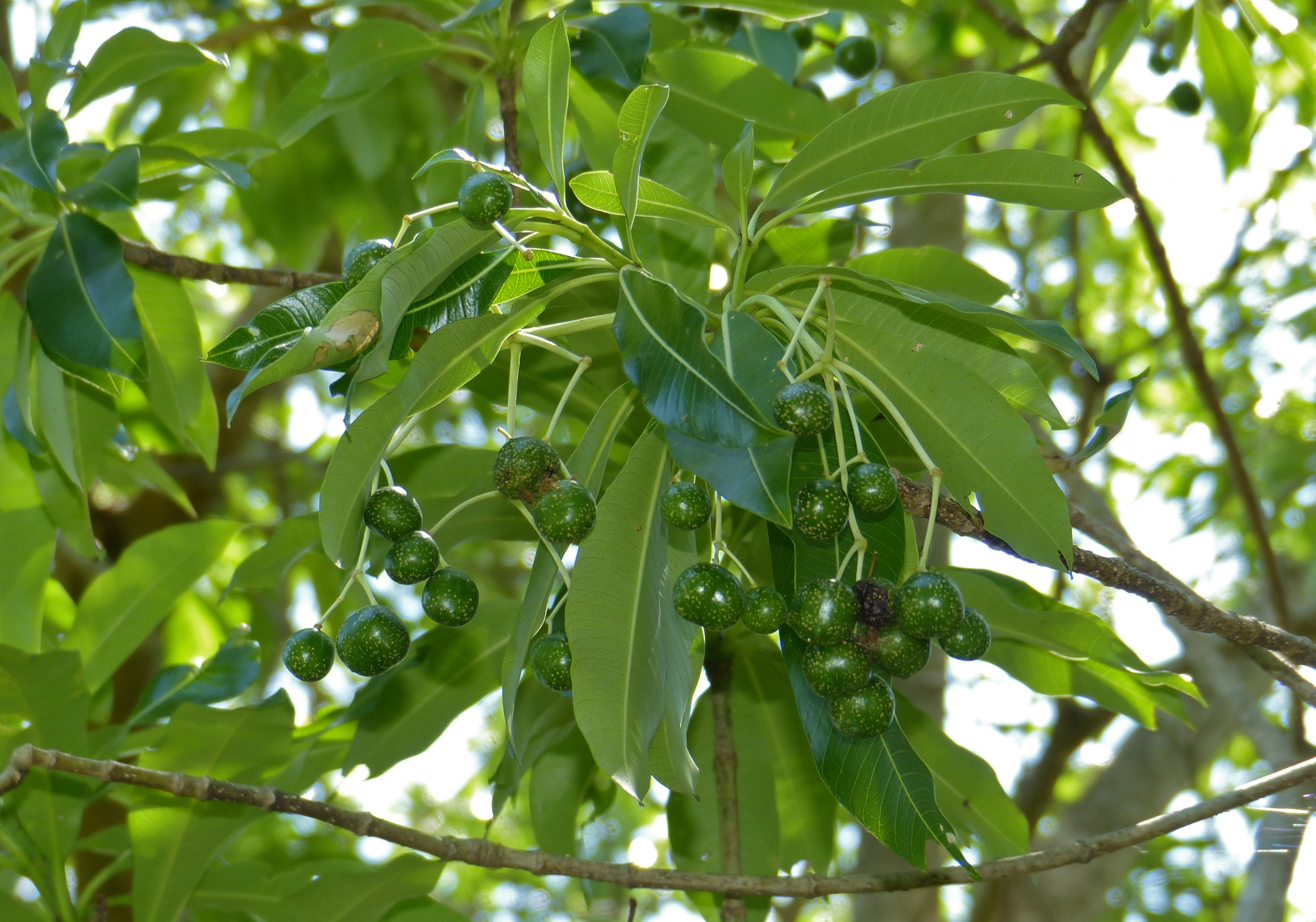
Fruit panicles

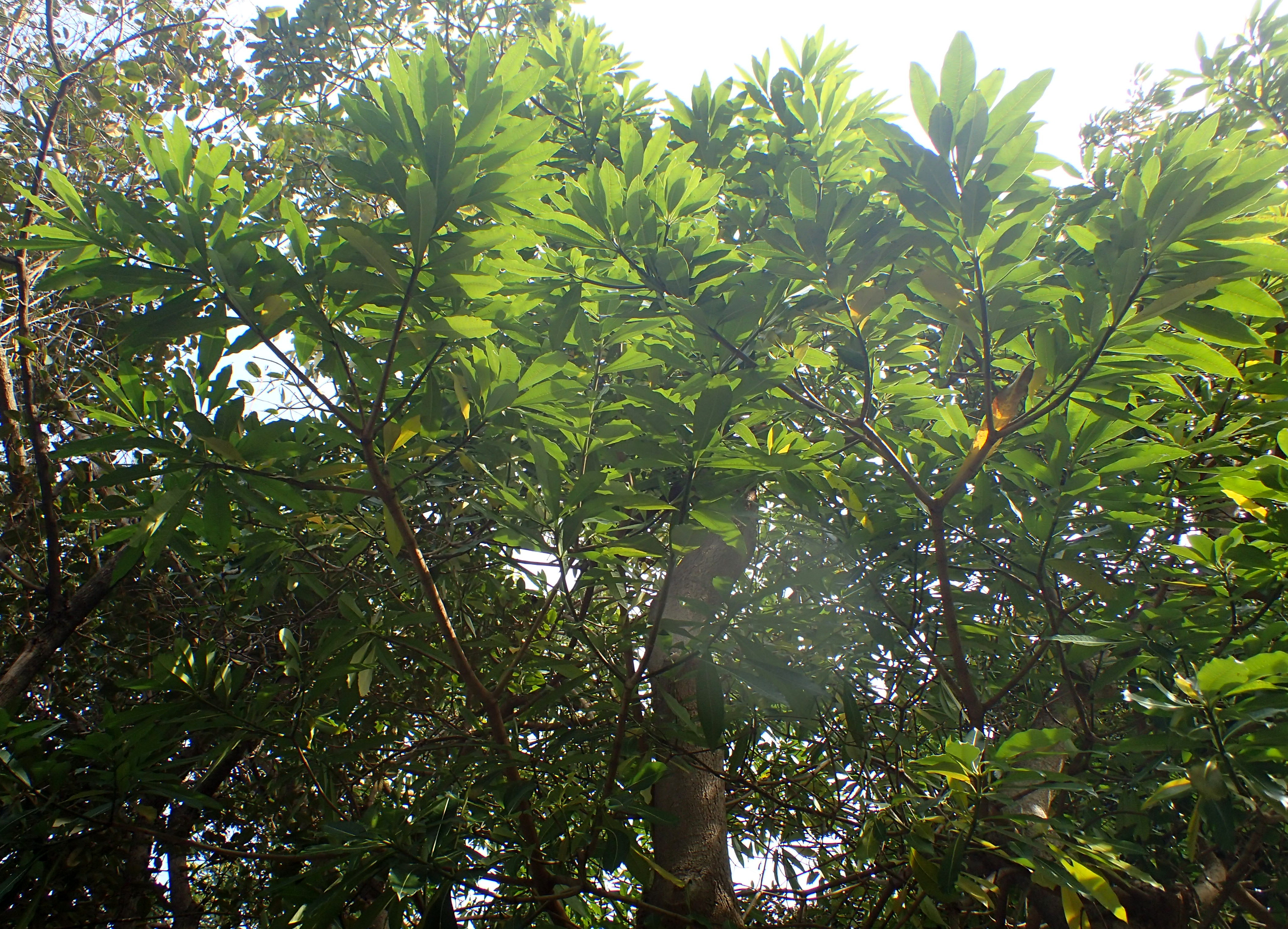
Foliage
