= Leonhard Rauwolf =

German physician, botanist, and traveller

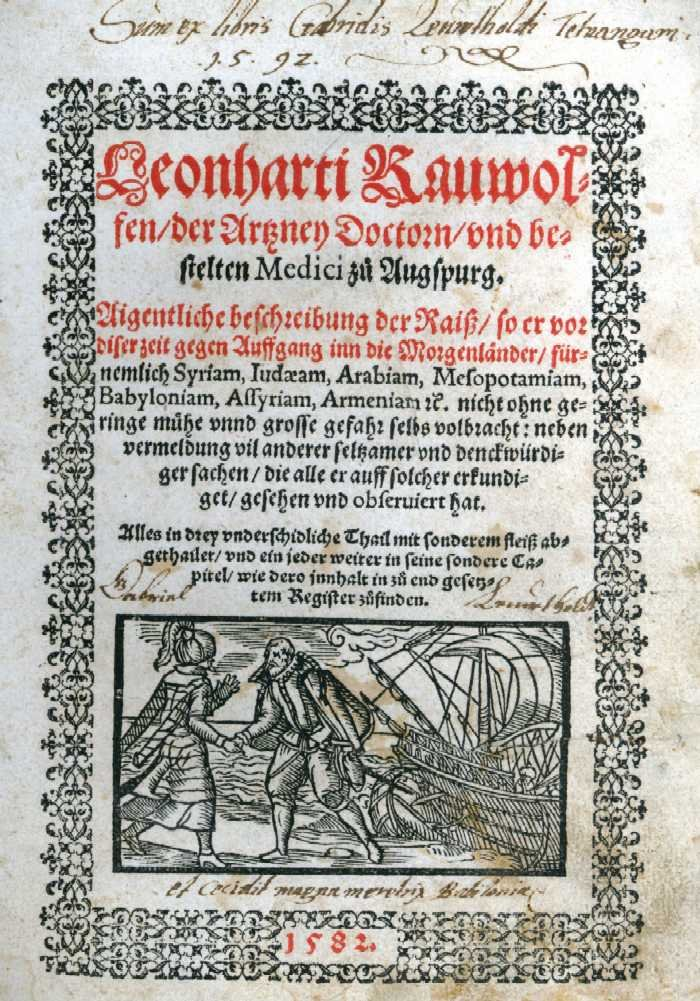
- The front page of Rauwolff's travel book dated 1582
- Born: 21 June 1535; Augsburg, Germany
- Died: 15 September 1596 (aged 61); Waitzen, Hungary
- Occupations: physician botanist
- Known for: Travel in the Levant

Leonhard Rauwolf (also spelled Leonhart Rauwolff) (21 June 1535 – 15 September 1596) was a German physician, botanist, and traveller. His main notability arises from a trip he made through the Levant and Mesopotamia in 1573–75. The motive of the trip was to search for herbal medicine supplies. Shortly after he returned, he published a set of new botanical descriptions with an herbarium. Later he published a general travel narrative about his visit.

== Early years ==
The young Rauwolff studied initially at University of Wittenberg and then studied botany and medicine at two universities in southern France, University of Montpellier and University of Valence. He was a pupil of Guillaume Rondelet in Montpellier in 1560. In 1564 he had the benefit of visiting the renowned botanist Carolus Clusius (who once had been a student of Rondelet too). In 1565 he set up a medical practice in his hometown, Augsburg, in Bavaria. In that year he married.

== Travel through Levant and Mesopotamia ==
Rauwolff's travel in the Near East was made possible by his brother-in-law Melchior Manlich, who hoped Rauwolff would come back with new plants and drugs that could be traded profitably by his firm. The Manlich firm already had trading relations with exporters in Tripoli in Lebanon. Rauwolff started his journey by going from Augsburg to Marseille in southern France, from which he sailed in 1573 to Tripoli in Lebanon. From Tripoli he went to Aleppo, where he stayed for many months. In 1574 he went from Aleppo to Baghdad and Mosul. In 1575 he went back to Aleppo and Tripoli and then on to Jerusalem. He was back in Augsburg in 1576. Rauwolff was the first European botanist of the post-medieval era to travel in Syria and Mesopotamia. Very shortly after his return he published the results of his botanic expeditions in his fourth herbarium "Viertes Kreutterbuech -- darein vil schoene und frembde Kreutter".

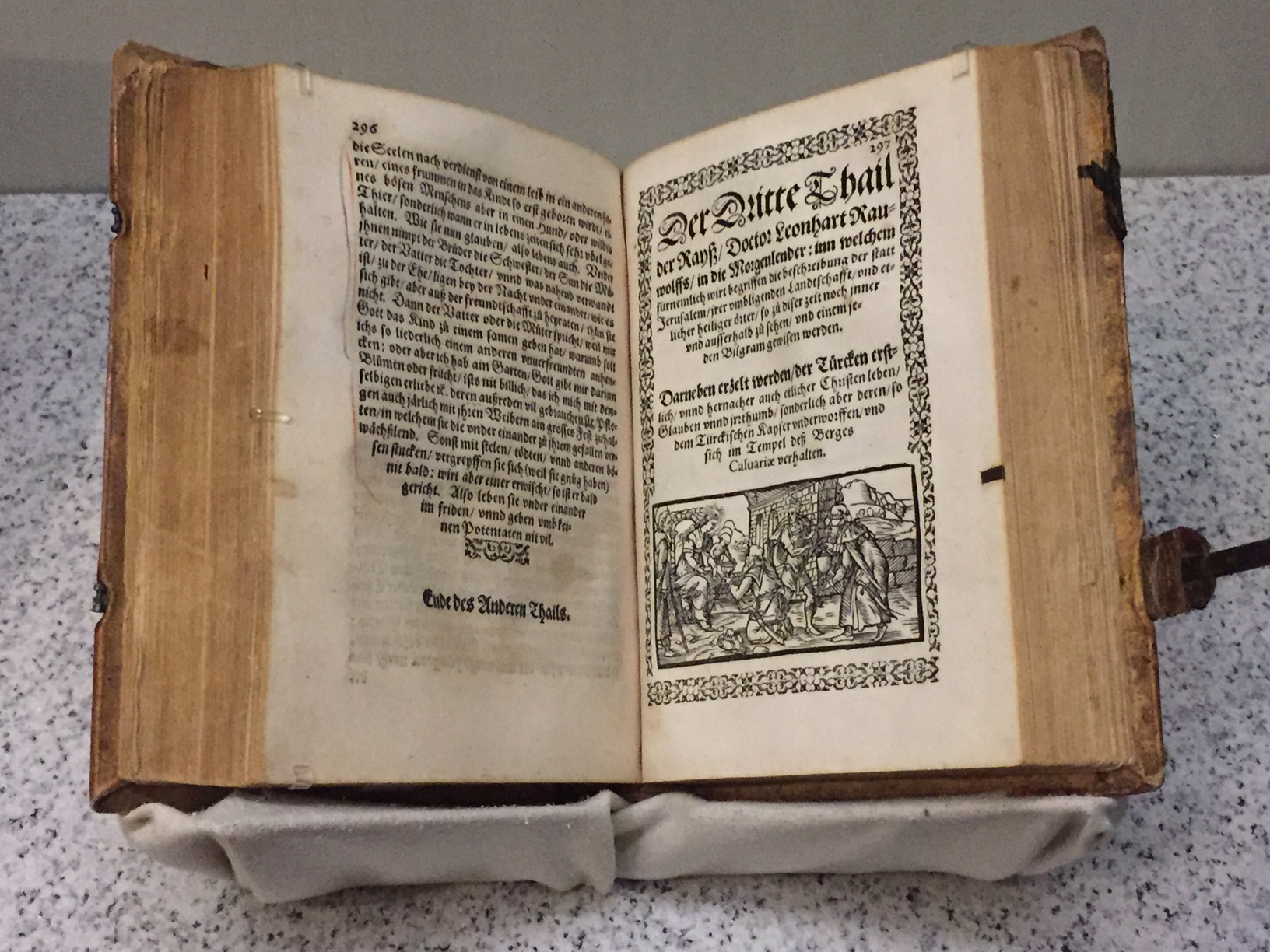
Leonhard Rauwolf: "Aigentliche Beschreibung der Raiß inn die Morgenländer." First edition, Lauingen, 1582. Deutsches Historisches Museum, Berlin

In addition to botanical investigations, Rauwolff observed and recorded his impressions of the people, customs, and sights of the Levantine region. In 1582 he published these as a book in German, "Aigentliche Beschreibung der Raiß inn die Morgenländerin". The English translation, "Dr. Leonhart Rauwolf's Travels into the Eastern Countries" (340 pages) was published in 1693 in a collection of travel narratives compiled by John Ray. Another translation was published in Dutch. Rauwolff was among the first Europeans to describe the drinking of coffee (which was unknown in Europe at the time): "A very good drink they call Chaube that is almost as black as ink and very good in illness, especially of the stomach. This they drink in the morning early in the open places before everybody, without any fear or regard, out of China cups, as hot as they can, sipping it a little at a time." Here is an extract from Rauwolff's description of Tripoli in Lebanon:

The town of Tripoli is pretty large, full of people, and of good account, because of the great deposition of merchandises that are brought thither daily both by sea and land. It is situated in a pleasant country, near the promontory of the high mountain Libanus, in a great plain toward the sea-shore, where you may see abundance of vineyards, and very fine gardens, enclosed with hedges for the most part, the hedges consisting chiefly of Rhamnus, Paliurus, Oxyacantha, Phillyrea, Lycium, Balaustium, Rubus, and little Palm-trees, that are low, and so sprout and spread themselves. In these gardens, as we came in, we found all sorts of salads and kitchen-herbs, such as Endive, Lettuce, Ruckoli, Asparagus, Celery,... Tarragon..., Cabbages, Cauliflowers, Turnips, Horseradishes, Carrots, of the greater sort of Fennel, Onions, Garlic, etc. And also fruit, as Water-melons, Melons, Gourds, Citruls, Melongena, Sesamum (by the natives called samsaim, the seeds whereof are very much used to strew upon their bread) and many more; but especially the Colocasia, which is very common there, and sold all the year long.... In great plenty there are citrons, lemons and oranges.... At Tripoli they have no want of water, for several rivers flow down from the mountains, and run partly through the town, and partly through the gardens, so that they want no water neither in the gardens nor in their houses.

== Later years ==
In 1588, the leaders of Augsburg reverted to Catholicism, and Rauwolf, a leader of the Protestant opposition, left. He next served as city physician in Linz for 8 years. In 1596 he joined the imperial troops fighting the Turks in Hungary, where he died. He died at Waitzen, the year before a battle there between the Austrians and Turks in 1597.

The plant genus Rauvolfia Plum. ex L. was named in his honor in the 18th century. The plant genus Alhagi, including its Arabic name, has it origin in Rauwolff's botany writings.
