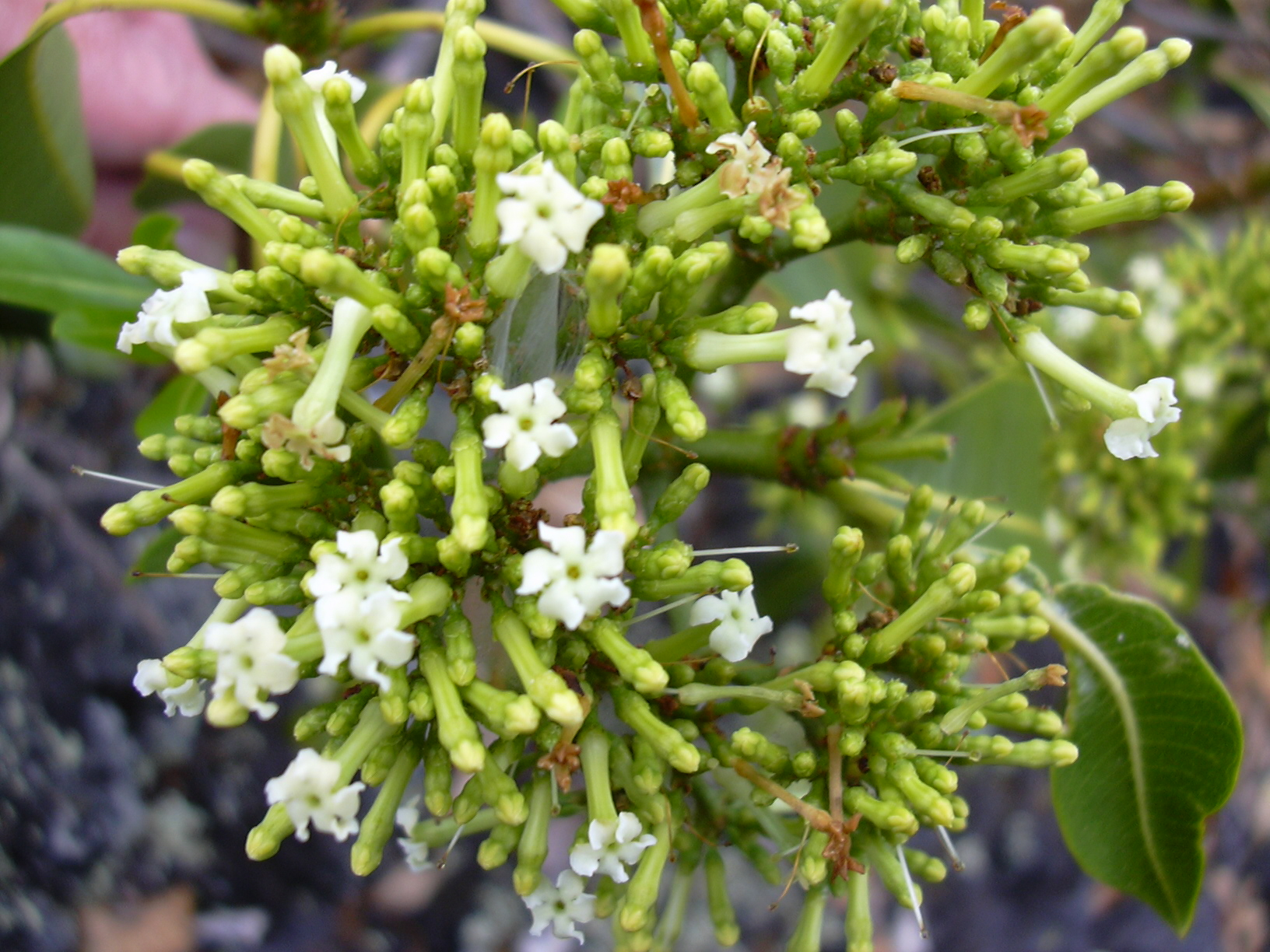
- Rauvolfia sandwicensis

Scientific classification
- Kingdom: Plantae
- Clade: Tracheophytes
- Clade: Angiosperms
- Clade: Eudicots
- Clade: Asterids
- Order: Gentianales
- Family: Apocynaceae
- Subfamily: Rauvolfioideae
- Tribe: Vinceae
- Subtribe: Rauvolfiinae; Benth. & Hook.f.
- Genus: Rauvolfia; L.

Type species
- Rauvolfia tetraphylla L., 1753

Synonyms
- Cyrtosiphonia Miq.; Dissolena Lour.; Heurckia Müll.Arg.; Ophioxylon L.; Podochrosia Baill.

= Rauvolfia =

Family of shrubs and trees

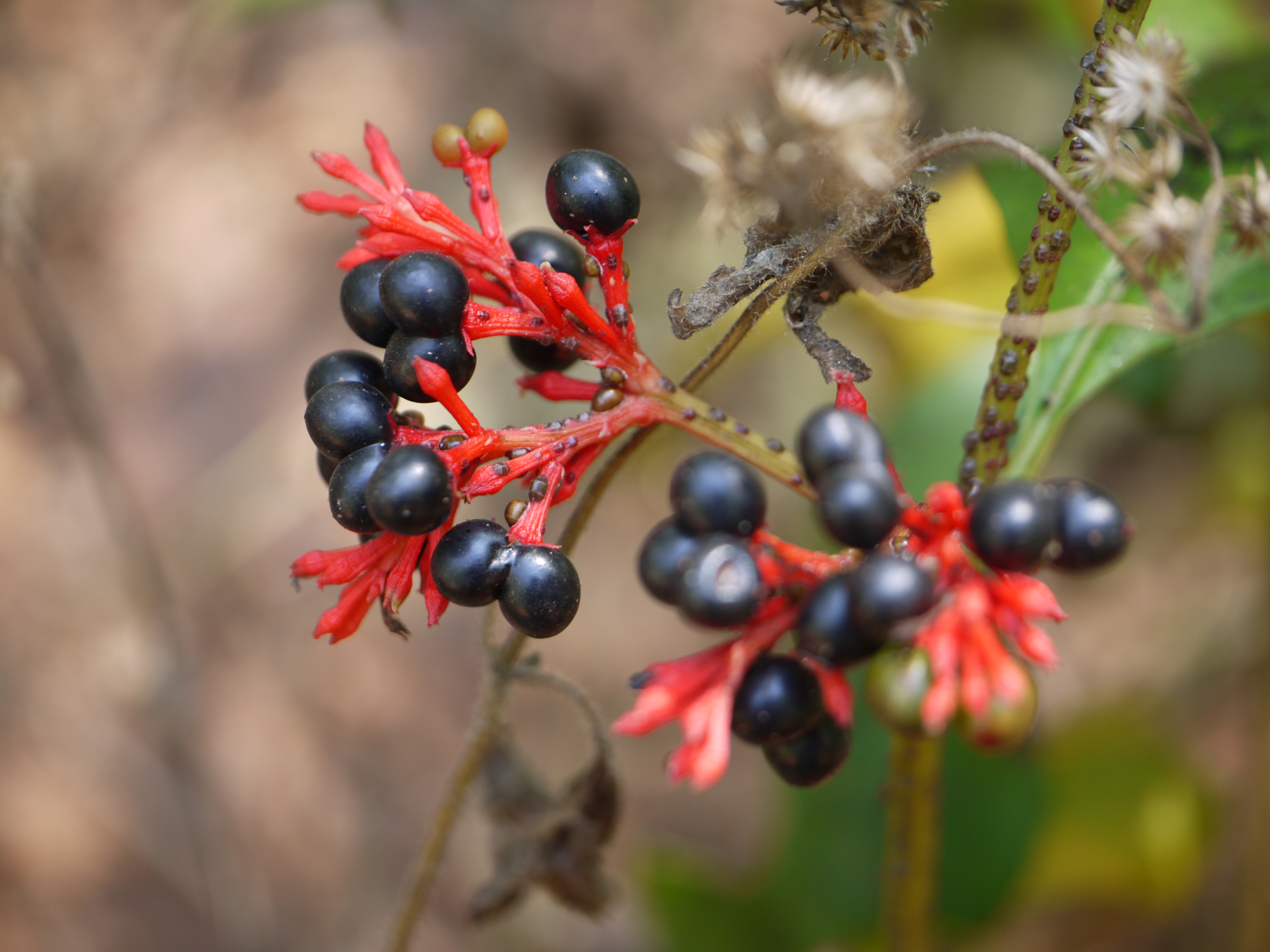
Rauvolfia serpentina fruit

Rauvolfia (sometimes spelled Rauwolfia) is a genus of evergreen trees and shrubs, commonly known as devil peppers, in the family Apocynaceae. The genus is named to honor Leonhard Rauwolf. The genus can mainly be found in tropical regions of Africa, Asia, Latin America, and various oceanic islands.

== Spelling ==
The International Code of Nomenclature for algae, fungi, and plants stipulates that the genus name was established by Carl Linnaeus in his 1753 book Species Plantarum, which cites his earlier description which states in Botanical Latin that the name is dedicated "to Leonhard Rauwolf": "Leon. Rauvolfio". Although some subsequent authors hypercorrected the Classical Latin letter "v" to a modern "w", this is not accepted by the code of nomenclature.

== Chemical constituents ==
Rauvolfia serpentina, commonly known as Indian snakeroot or sarpagandha, contains many indole alkaloids.

=== Medicinal uses ===
Reserpine is an alkaloid first isolated from R. serpentina and was widely used as an antihypertensive drug

== Conservation ==
Rauvolfia serpentina is declining in the wild due to collection for its medicinal uses. Consequently, it is listed in CITES Appendix II. Rauvolfia vomitoria is a highly invasive species in Hawaiʻi, and is capable of establishing dense monotypic stands.

== Species ==
Species include:

- Rauvolfia afra Sond., 1850 - Africa from Togo east to Tanzania, south to Cape Province
- Rauvolfia amsoniifolia A.DC. - Philippines, Sulawesi, Maluku, Lesser Sunda Islands
- Rauvolfia andina Markgr. - Peru
- Rauvolfia anomala Rapini & I.Koch - Mato Grosso
- Rauvolfia aphlebia (Standl.) A.H.Gentry - Costa Rica, Panama, Colombia
- Rauvolfia bahiensis A.DC. - E Brazil
- Rauvolfia balansae (Baill.) Boiteau - New Caledonia
- Rauvolfia biauriculata Müll.Arg. - Cuba, Haiti, Lesser Antilles, Trinidad & Tobago
- Rauvolfia capixabae I.Koch & Kin.-Gouv - Bahia + Espírito Santo in Brazil
- Rauvolfia capuronii Markgr. - Madagascar
- Rauvolfia chaudocensis Pierre ex Pit. - S Vietnam
- Rauvolfia cubana A.DC. - Cuba; naturalized in Yunnan
- Rauvolfia decurva Hook.f. - India
- Rauvolfia dichotoma K.Schum. - São Tomé
- Rauvolfia gracilis I.Koch & Kin.-Gouv. - Rondônia, Mato Grosso
- Rauvolfia grandiflora Mart. ex A.DC. - E Brazil
- Rauvolfia hookeri S.R.Sriniv. & Chithra - S India
- Rauvolfia indosinensis Pichon - Cambodia, S Vietnam
- Rauvolfia insularis Markgr. - Palau
- Rauvolfia × ivanovii Granda & V.R.Fuentes - Cuba (R. ligustrina × R. viridis)
- Rauvolfia javanica Koord. & Valeton - Java, Sumatra, Lesser Sunda Islands
- Rauvolfia kamarora Hendrian - Sulawesi
- Rauvolfia leptophylla A.S.Rao - Colombia, Venezuela
- Rauvolfia letouzeyi Leeuwenb. - Gabon, Republic of Congo
- Rauvolfia ligustrina Willd. ex Roem. & Schult. - from Mexico + Cuba south to Paraguay + NE Argentina
- Rauvolfia linearifolia Britton & P.Wilson - E Cuba
- Rauvolfia littoralis Rusby - Costa Rica, Panama, Colombia, Ecuador
- Rauvolfia macrantha K.Schum. ex Markgr. - Panama, Colombia, Ecuador, N Brazil, Peru
- Rauvolfia mannii Stapf, 1894 - tropical Africa from Ivory Coast to Tanzania, south to Malawi
- Rauvolfia mattfeldiana Markgr. - Brazil
- Rauvolfia maxima Markgr. - Venezuela
- Rauvolfia media Pichon, 1947 - Comoros, Madagascar
- Rauvolfia micrantha Hook.f., 1882 - SW India, S Thailand, Vietnam
- Rauvolfia microcarpa Hook.f. - Myanmar
- Rauvolfia moluccana Markgr. - Maluku, New Guinea, Bismarck Archipelago
- Rauvolfia mombasiana Stapf - Kenya, Tanzania, Mozambique
- Rauvolfia moricandii A.DC. - E Brazil
- Rauvolfia nana E.A.Bruce - E Angola, Zambia, S Zaïre
- Rauvolfia nitida Jacq. - West Indies, Panama, S Mexico
- †Rauvolfia nukuhivensis (Fosberg & Sachet) Lorence & Butaud - French Polynesia but extinct
- Rauvolfia obtusiflora A.DC. - Madagascar
- Rauvolfia oligantha Hendrian - C Java
- Rauvolfia pachyphylla Markgr. - Venezuela, Guyana
- Rauvolfia paraensis Ducke - N Brazil, Peru, Suriname, French Guiana
- Rauvolfia paucifolia A.DC. - E Brazil
- Rauvolfia peguana Hook.f. - Myanmar
- Rauvolfia pentaphylla Ducke - N Brazil, Peru
- Rauvolfia polyphylla Benth. - S Venezuela, N Brazil
- Rauvolfia praecox K.Schum. ex Markgr. - W Brazil, Peru, Bolivia
- Rauvolfia pruinosifolia I.Koch & Kin.-Gouv. - Minas Gerais
- Rauvolfia purpurascens Standl. - Costa Rica, Panama, Colombia, Ecuador
- Rauvolfia rhonhofiae Markgr. - Ecuador
- Rauvolfia rivularis Merr. - Myanmar
- Rauvolfia rostrata Markgr. - Maluku, New Guinea, Bismarck Archipelago
- Rauvolfia sachetiae Fosberg, 1981 - Marquesas in French Polynesia
- Rauvolfia salicifolia Griseb. - Cuba
- Rauvolfia sanctorum Woodson - Colombia, Peru
- Rauvolfia sandwicensis A.DC., 1844 - Hawaiian Islands (Hawaiʻi)
- Rauvolfia schuelii Speg. - Bolivia, NW Argentina
- Rauvolfia sellowii Müll.Arg. - Brazil, Paraguay, Misiones Province of Argentina
- Rauvolfia semperflorens (Müll.Arg.) Schltr. - New Caledonia
- Rauvolfia serpentina (L.) Benth. ex Kurz, 1877 - Indian Subcontinent, China, Southeast Asia
- Rauvolfia sevenetii Boiteau - New Caledonia
- Rauvolfia spathulata Boiteau - New Caledonia
- Rauvolfia sprucei Müll.Arg. - S Venezuela, Peru, N Brazil
- Rauvolfia steyermarkii Woodson - Táchira in Venezuela
- Rauvolfia sumatrana Jack, 1820 - Guangdong, Thailand, Myanmar, Andaman & Nicobar Islands, Malaysia, Indonesia, Philippines
- Rauvolfia tetraphylla L., 1753 - Also called Rauwolfia carescens; from Mexico and West Indies to Peru; naturalized in China, Indian Subcontinent, Andaman Islands, Vietnam, Queensland
- Rauvolfia tiaolushanensis Tsiang - Hainan in S China
- Rauvolfia verticillata (Lour.) Baill., 1895 - China, Indian Subcontinent, Indochina, Malaysia, Indonesia, Philippines
- Rauvolfia vietnamensis Lý - Vietnam
- Rauvolfia viridis Willd. ex Roem. & Schult. - West Indies, Costa Rica, Colombia, Venezuela
- Rauvolfia volkensii (K.Schum.) Stapf - Tanzania
- Rauvolfia vomitoria Afzel., 1817 - tropical Africa from Senegal east to Sudan + Tanzania, south to Angola; naturalized in China, Bangladesh, Puerto Rico
- Rauvolfia weddeliana Müll.Arg. - Brazil, Paraguay
- Rauvolfia woodsoniana Standl. - Costa Rica

formerly included

- Rauvolfia celastrifolia Baker = Stephanostegia hildebrandtii Baill.
- Rauvolfia dentata Tafalla ex D.Don = Citharexylum dentatum D.Don
- Rauvolfia flexuosa Ruiz & Pav. = Citharexylum flexuosum (Ruiz & Pav.) D.Don
- Rauvolfia glabra Cav. = Vallesia glabra (Cav.) Link
- Rauvolfia laevigata Willd. ex Roem. & Schult. = Tabernaemontana amygdalifolia Jacq.
- Rauvolfia longifolia A.DC. = Alstonia longifolia (A.DC.) Pichon
- Rauvolfia macrophylla Ruiz & Pav. 1799 not Stapf 1894 = Citharexylum flexuosum (Ruiz & Pav.) D.Don
- Rauvolfia oppositifolia Spreng. 1822 not Sessé & Moc. 1888 = Tabernaemontana oppositifolia (Spreng.) Urb.
- Rauvolfia pubescens Willd. ex Roem. & Schult. = Citharexylum quitense Spreng.
- Rauvolfia spinosa Cav. = Citharexylum flexuosum (Ruiz & Pav.) D.Don
- Rauvolfia stenophylla Donn.Sm. = Alstonia longifolia (A.DC.) Pichon
- Rauvolfia strempelioides Griseb. = Strempeliopsis strempelioides (Griseb.) Benth. ex B.D.Jacks.
- Rauvolfia striata Poir. = Ochrosia borbonica J.F.Gmel.

== Bibliography ==
- McNeill, J.; Barrie, F.R.; Buck, W.R.; Demoulin, V.; Greuter, W.; Hawksworth, D.L.; Herendeen, P.S.; Knapp, S.; Marhold, K.; Prado, J.; Prud'homme Van Reine, W.F.; Smith, G.F.; Wiersema, J.H.; Turland, N.J. (2012). International Code of Nomenclature for algae, fungi, and plants (Melbourne Code) adopted by the Eighteenth International Botanical Congress Melbourne, Australia, July 2011. Vol. Regnum Vegetabile 154. A.R.G. Gantner Verlag KG. ISBN 978-3-87429-425-6.
