= Serpentine (alkaloid) =

Names
- IUPAC name (19α)-16-(Methoxycarbonyl)-19-methyl-3,4,5,6,16,17-hexadehydro-18-oxayohimban-4-ium-1-ide
- Other names Methyl ester of serpentinic acid

Identifiers
CAS Number	18786-24-8
3D model (JSmol)	Interactive image
ChEBI	CHEBI:9119
ChemSpider	65865; 66108 (chloride)
ECHA InfoCard	100.038.684
PubChem CID	73391; 5351483 (chloride)
UNII	B503RKE34F
CompTox Dashboard (EPA)	DTXSID80927029 DTXSID40940259, DTXSID80927029
- InChI: InChI=1S/C21H20N2O3/c1-12-16-10-23-8-7-14-13-5-3-4-6-18(13)22-20(14)19(23)9-15(16)17(11-26-12)21(24)25-2/h3-8,11-12,15-16H,9-10H2,1-2H3/t12-,15-,16+/m0/s1 Key: WYTGDNHDOZPMIW-VBNZEHGJSA-N
- SMILES: C[C@H]1[C@H]2C[n+]3ccc4c5ccccc5[n-]c4c3C[C@@H]2C(=CO1)C(=O)OC

Properties
Chemical formula	C_{21}H_{21}N_{2}O_{3}
Molar mass	349.410 g·mol^{−1}
- Except where otherwise noted, data are given for materials in their standard state (at 25 °C [77 °F], 100 kPa). Infobox references

Serpentine is a terpene indole alkaloid produced by several members of the family Apocynaceae (thus an "apocynaceae alkaloid"), including Catharanthus roseus and Rauvolfia serpentina.

== See also ==
- Vinervine
- Akuammicine
