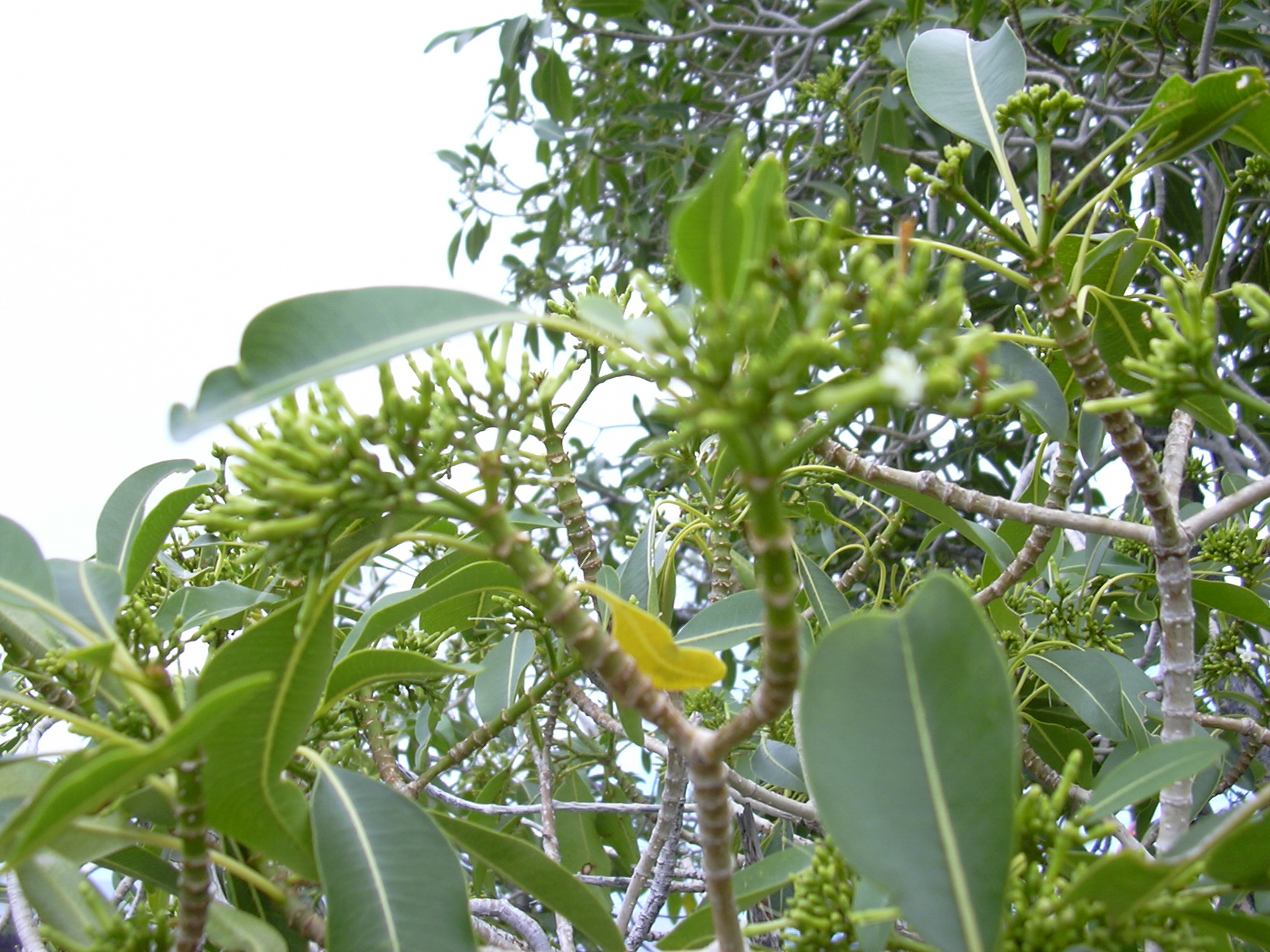

Conservation status
- Vulnerable (IUCN 3.1)

- Vulnerable (NatureServe)

Scientific classification
- Kingdom: Plantae
- Clade: Tracheophytes
- Clade: Angiosperms
- Clade: Eudicots
- Clade: Asterids
- Order: Gentianales
- Family: Apocynaceae
- Genus: Rauvolfia
- Species: R. sandwicensis

Binomial name
- Rauvolfia sandwicensis A.DC.

= Rauvolfia sandwicensis =

Species of plant

Rauvolfia sandwicensis, the devil's-pepper, also known as hao in the Hawaiian language, is a species of flowering plant in the milkweed family, Apocynaceae, that is endemic to Hawaii. It is a shrub, a small tree reaching 6 m (20 ft) in height, or, rarely, a medium-sized tree up to 12 m (39 ft) tall with a trunk diameter of 0.3 m (0.98 ft). Hao inhabits coastal mesic and mixed mesic forests at elevations of 100–500 m (330–1,640 ft).

== Significance ==
The Hao is one of the few rare species of plant in Hawaiʻi along with the Antidesma pulvinatum or Hame, Mvoporum sandwicense or Naio, Reynoldsia sandwicensis or 'Ohe, Santalum paniculatum or 'Iliahi, Senna gaudichaudii or Kolomona, and Xylosma hawaiiense or Maua. Within all the Hawaiian Islands but Kaho'olawe, the Hao grows in dry- or shrub-land forests within lower elevations as the tree is part of the Dogbane or Apocynaceae family. The Hao does not have any known religious or cultural significance, or usefulness as forage, food, medicine, or shelter, for the Hawaiian people. Documentations have shown that the Hao trees can reside within areas of 'a'ā lava flow on Maui and the Hawaii Island or Big Island.

== Description ==
The wood of the Hao is a yellow-ish color and the wood can produce a poisonous smoke if burned. During 1957, a study was conducted on the Hao to determine the types of alkaloid compounds within the make-up of the tree. The evidence showed that the Hao tree contained Tetraphylline, Tetraphyllicine, Sandwincine, and Ajmalicine with the alkaloid compounds having a unique relationship for the tree. The Hao trees are typically small but there have been sightings of taller-sized Hao trees on Kaua'i. One other plant that resembles that Hao tree is the Ochrosia compta or Holei tree due to both plants having similar looking flowers and sized fruits. The main differences between the Hao and the Holei trees are the leaf color and texture. The Hao leaf has a lighter green color and thinner texture compared to the Holei.
