= Asima Chatterjee =

Indian organic chemist (1917–2006)

- Born: 23 September 1917; Calcutta, Bengal Presidency, British India
- Died: 22 November 2006 (aged 89); Kolkata, West Bengal, India
- Education: University of Calcutta (DS)
- Occupation: Chemist
- Spouse: Baradananda Chatterjee (m. 1945)
- Children: 1
- Scientific career
- Fields: Organic chemistry, phytomedicine
- Workplaces: Rajabazar Science College; University of Calcutta

Member of Parliament, Rajya Sabha
- In office 18 February 1982 – 13 April 1984
- In office 9 May 1984 – 8 May 1990
- Constituency: Nominated

Asima Chatterjee (23 September 1917 – 22 November 2006) was an Indian organic chemist noted for her work in the fields of organic chemistry and phytomedicine. Her most notable work includes research on vinca alkaloids, the development of anti-epileptic drugs, and development of anti-malarial drugs. She also authored a considerable volume of work on medicinal plants of the Indian subcontinent. She was the first woman to receive a Doctorate of Science from an Indian university.

== Biography ==
=== Early life ===
Asima Chatterjee was born on 23 September 1917 in Kolkata, India. She was born into a middle-class family which, at the time, meant no education for females. She was also the eldest child with a younger brother which meant having more responsibilities in an Indian family as you become the face of the new generation. Her father Indra Narayan Mookerjee was a doctor and was very supportive of Asima and her brother’s education, which was rare at the time. Her father loved Botany, this was where she developed her interest in medicine. But, her particular interest in the field of medicine began with her curiosity regarding the medicinal properties of plants. In 1936, she did her higher studies in chemistry, passing with honors distinction, from the Scottish Church College of the University of Calcutta. There weren't many girls in her class as women were rarely pushed to study more.

=== Education work ===
In an era when the women did not commonly pursue higher education, Asima chose to study Chemistry. She graduated, with honours, from the Bethune College, University of Calcutta in 1936. She further pursued Masters in Organic Chemistry from the University of Calcutta and obtained the degree in 1938. She did not stop at this and went on to do her D.Sc. at the University of Calcutta. She was the first woman to receive a doctorate at an Indian University in 1944. As a doctoral student, she worked on the chemistry of plant products and synthetic organic chemistry with the renowned chemist, Prafulla Chandra Ray (known as the father of chemical science in India) and Satyendra Nath Bose, the famous physicist. She went on to work with Lásló Zechmeister at University of Wisconsin and Caltech for her post-doctoral research on biologically active alkaloids.

She later joined the University College of Science at the University of Calcutta as a Reader in pure Chemistry. She continued her research on the nature of biologically active compounds found in medicinal plants. At that time, it was very difficult for scientists to work due to fewer funds from the government and Asima had to invest in her own money to send samples for analysis outside India. She struggled to get the necessary chemicals and reagents for her research and was barely able to pay her students' salaries. In spite of a huge setback in 1967, when she lost her father and husband within a span of 4 months, Asima Chatterjee came back to science after a few months (she suffered a major health scare herself at the same time). Her co-workers at that time provided her unstinting support and she overcame this trying period and continued her work. Through her research, she developed anti-epileptic, anti-convulsive, and chemotherapy drugs to treat patients. The anti-epileptic drug – 'Ayush-56'- which she developed from Marsilia minuta is her most successful work and till date, it is used commercially. From different types of plants she developed anti-malarial drugs with her team. She also dedicated 40 years of her time to research on cancer and anti-cancer growth drugs. She studied alkaloids, which were used effectively in chemotherapy for cancer patients.

She was the first female to receive a doctorate and even started a chemistry department in the Lady Brabourne College of the University of Calcutta.

=== Personal life ===
She married Baradananda Chatterjee, a physical-chemist, in 1945 and had a daughter, Julie, with him. She died on 22 November 2006 in a nursing home in Kolkata, at the age of 89.

=== Achievements ===
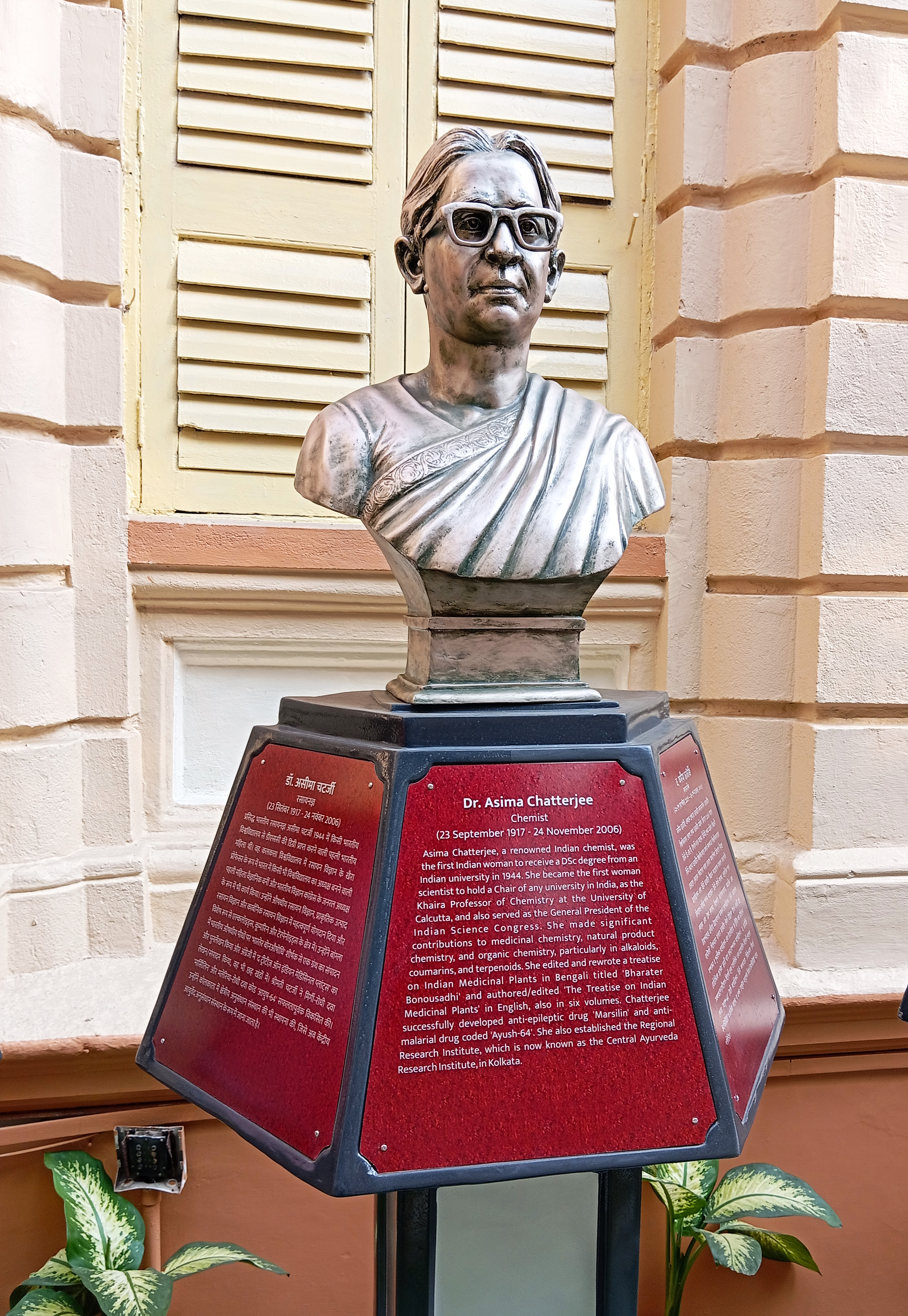
Statue of Asima Chatterjee, Birla Industrial & Technological Museum, Kolkata, West Bengal, India

Chatterjee's contributions to science include the following:

- Initiated chemical investigation of alkaloids in Rauwolfia canescens.
- Investigated the chemistry of almost all principal types of indole alkaloids.
- Contributions to the elucidation of the structure and stereochemistry of ajmalicine and sarpagine.
- First suggested stereo-configuration of sarpagine.
- Isolated and characterised geissoschizine, a key precursor in biogenesis of indole alkaloids from Rhazya stricta.
- Carried out synthetic studies on a number of complex indole, quinoline and isoquinoline alkaloids.
- Developed procedures for the preparation of beta-phenylethanolamines in connection with alkaloid synthesis.
- Elucidated the structure of luvangetin isolated from Luvanga scandens.
- Studied the action of various Lewis acids on prenylated coumarins and devised simple synthetic routes to a number of complex coumarin systems.
- Investigated the mechanism of acid-catalysed hydramine fission of beta phenylethanol amines.
- Introduced the use of periodic acid as a reagent for the detection and location of both terminal and exocyclic double bonds in organic compounds.

== Awards and recognition ==
- She was a Premchand Roychand Scholar of the University of Calcutta.
- From 1962 to 1982, she was the Khaira Professor of Chemistry, one of the coveted chairs of the University of Calcutta.
- In 1972, she was appointed as the Honorary Coordinator of the Special Assistance Programme to intensify teaching and research in natural product chemistry, sanctioned by the Indian University Grants Commission.
- In 1960, she was elected a Fellow of the Indian National Science Academy, New Delhi.
- In 1961, she received the Shanti Swarup Bhatnagar Award in chemical science, becoming the first female recipient of this award.
- In 1975, she was conferred the Padma Bhushan and became the first female scientist to be elected as the General President of the Indian Science Congress Association .
- She was conferred the D. Sc. (honoris causa) degree by several universities.
- She was nominated by the President of India as a Member of the Rajya Sabha from February 1982 to May 1990.
- On 23 September 2017, the search engine Google deployed a 24-hour Google Doodle in honour of the 100th anniversary of Chatterjee's birth.
- She won the C.V Raman award, P.C Ray Award, and the S.S Bhatnagar award.

== See also ==
- Timeline of women in science
