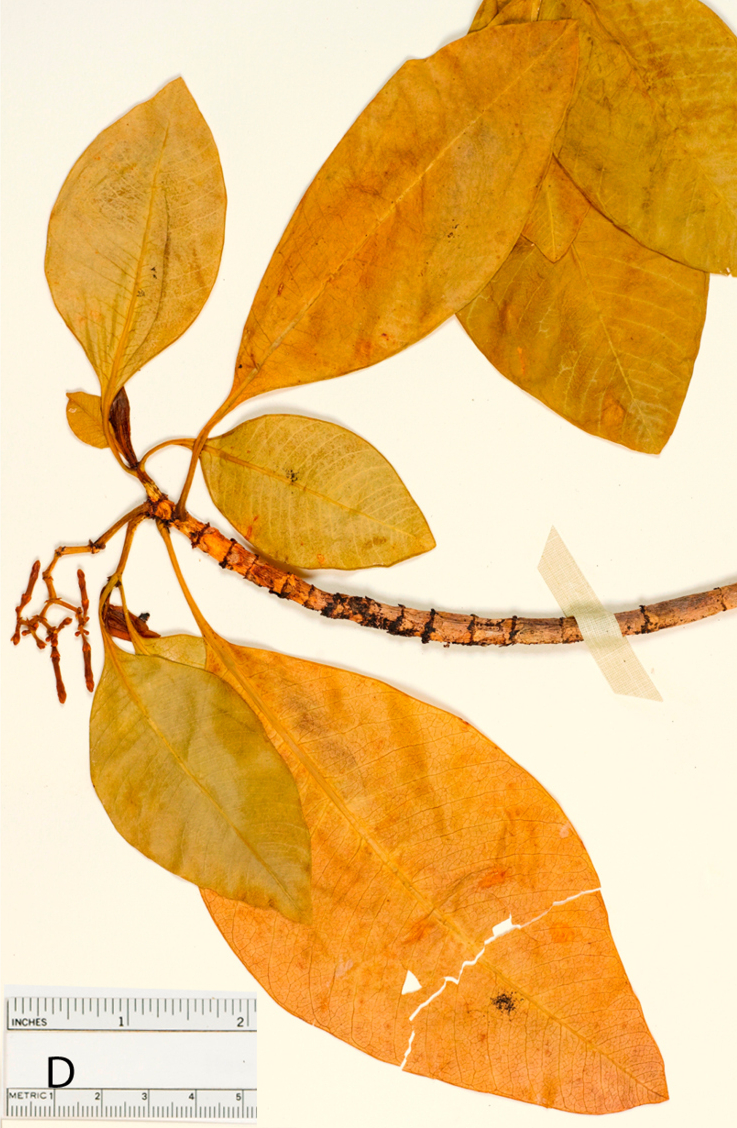

Conservation status
- Critically Endangered (IUCN 2.3)

Scientific classification
- Kingdom: Plantae
- Clade: Tracheophytes
- Clade: Angiosperms
- Clade: Eudicots
- Clade: Asterids
- Order: Gentianales
- Family: Apocynaceae
- Genus: Rauvolfia
- Species: R. sachetiae

Binomial name
- Rauvolfia sachetiae Fosberg (1981)

= Rauvolfia sachetiae =

Species of plant

Rauvolfia sachetiae is a species of plant in the family Apocynaceae. It is endemic to the Marquesas Islands in French Polynesia. It is listed as a "Critically endangered" species.
