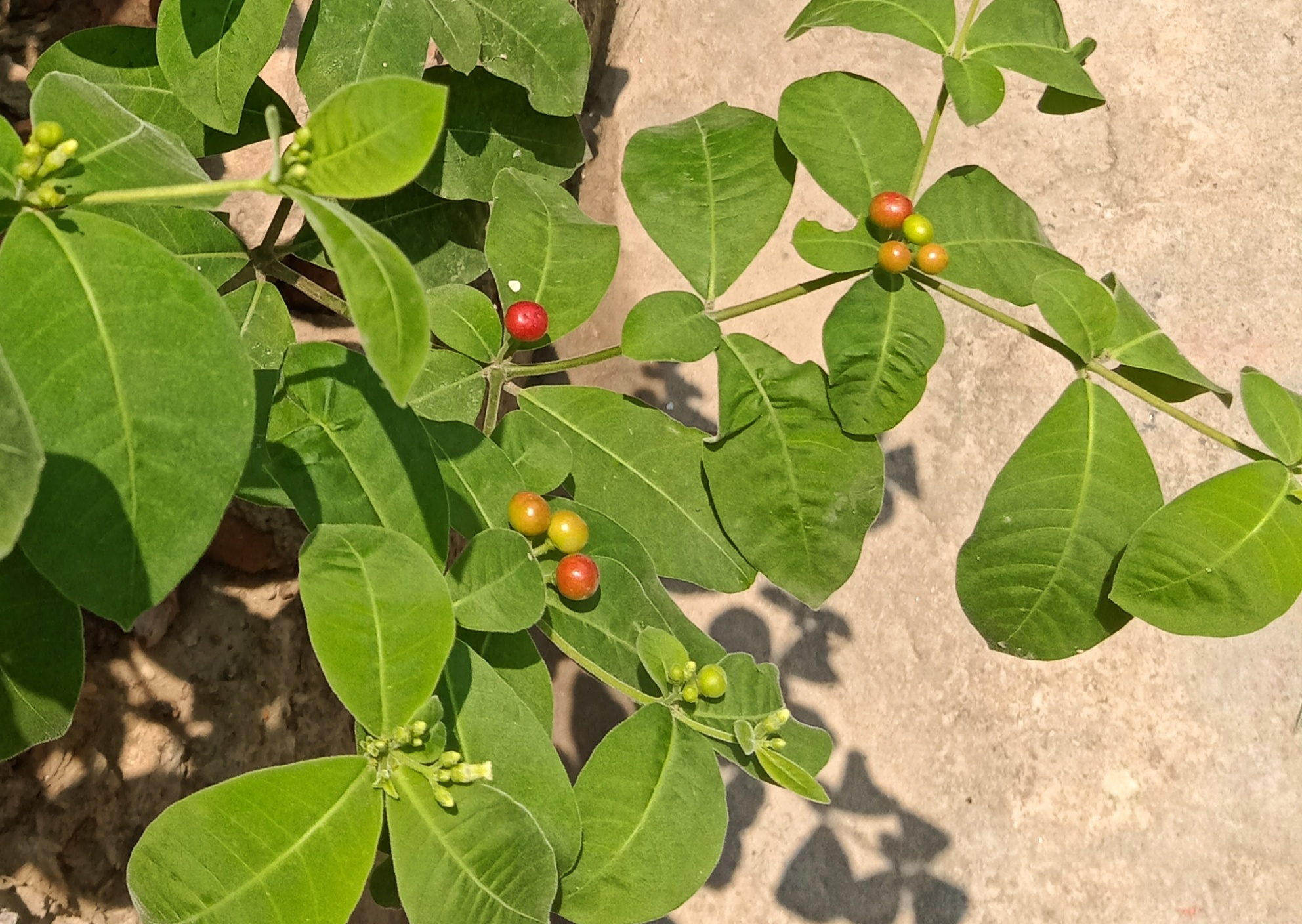

Scientific classification
- Kingdom: Plantae
- Clade: Embryophytes
- Clade: Tracheophytes
- Clade: Angiosperms
- Clade: Eudicots
- Clade: Asterids
- Order: Gentianales
- Family: Apocynaceae
- Genus: Rauvolfia
- Species: R. tetraphylla

Binomial name
- Rauvolfia tetraphylla L.

Synonyms
- Rauvolfia canescens L.; Rauvolfia heterophylla Willd. ex Roem. & Schult.; Rauvolfia hirsuta Jacq.; Rauvolfia latifolia var. minor Müll.Arg.; Rauvolfia odontophora Van Heurck & Müll.Arg.; Rauvolfia subpubescens L.; Rauvolfia tomentosa Jacq.

= Rauvolfia tetraphylla =

Species of tree

Rauvolfia tetraphylla is a plant in the family Apocynaceae, growing as a bush or small tree. It is commonly known as the be still tree or devil-pepper. The plant is native to Mexico, Central America, West Indies, and northern South America. It has been cultivated widely as both an ornamental and for use in traditional medicine. It is now naturalized throughout the tropics including Australasia, Indochina, and India.

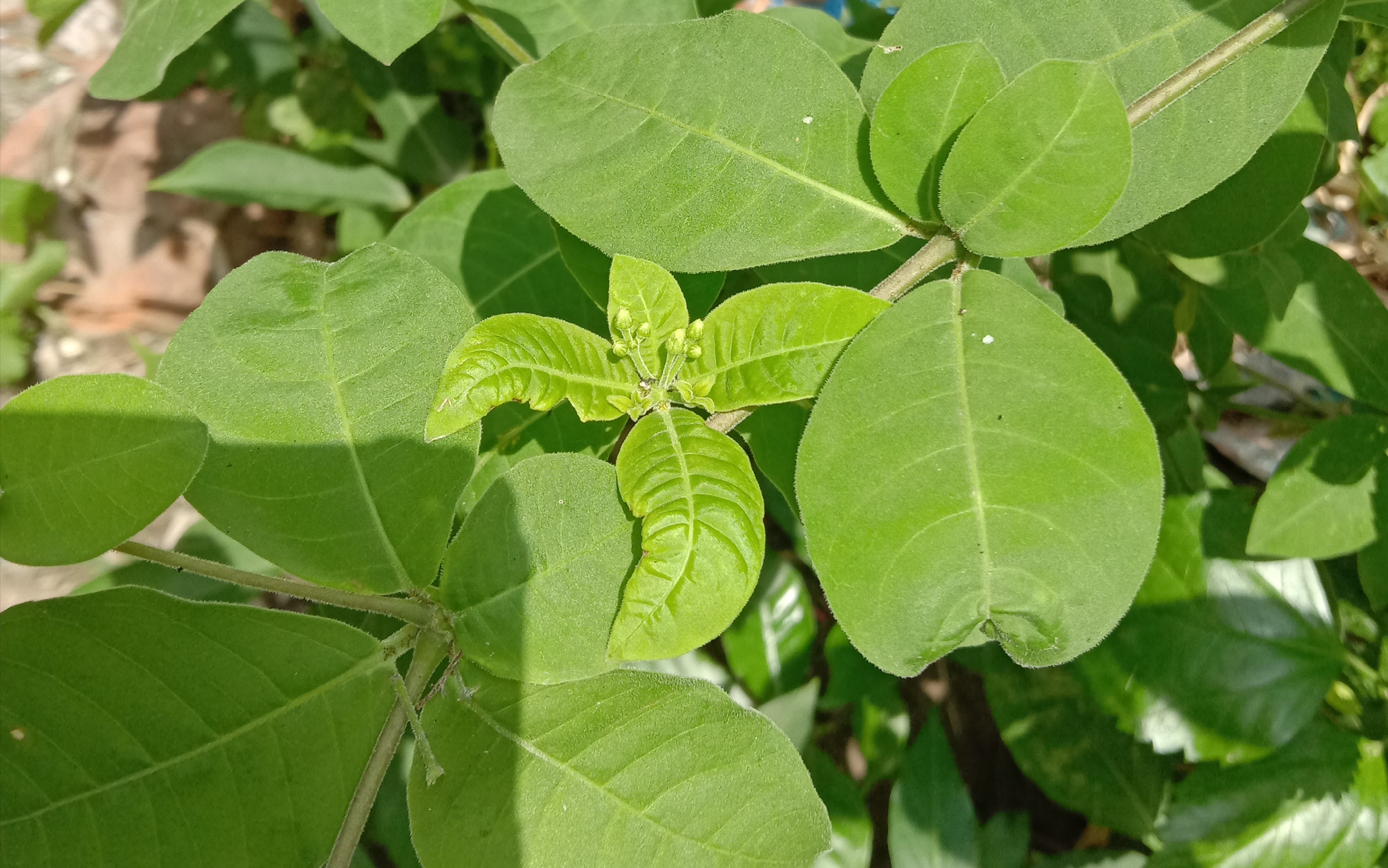
Rauvolfia tetraphylla plant captured in West Bengal, India.

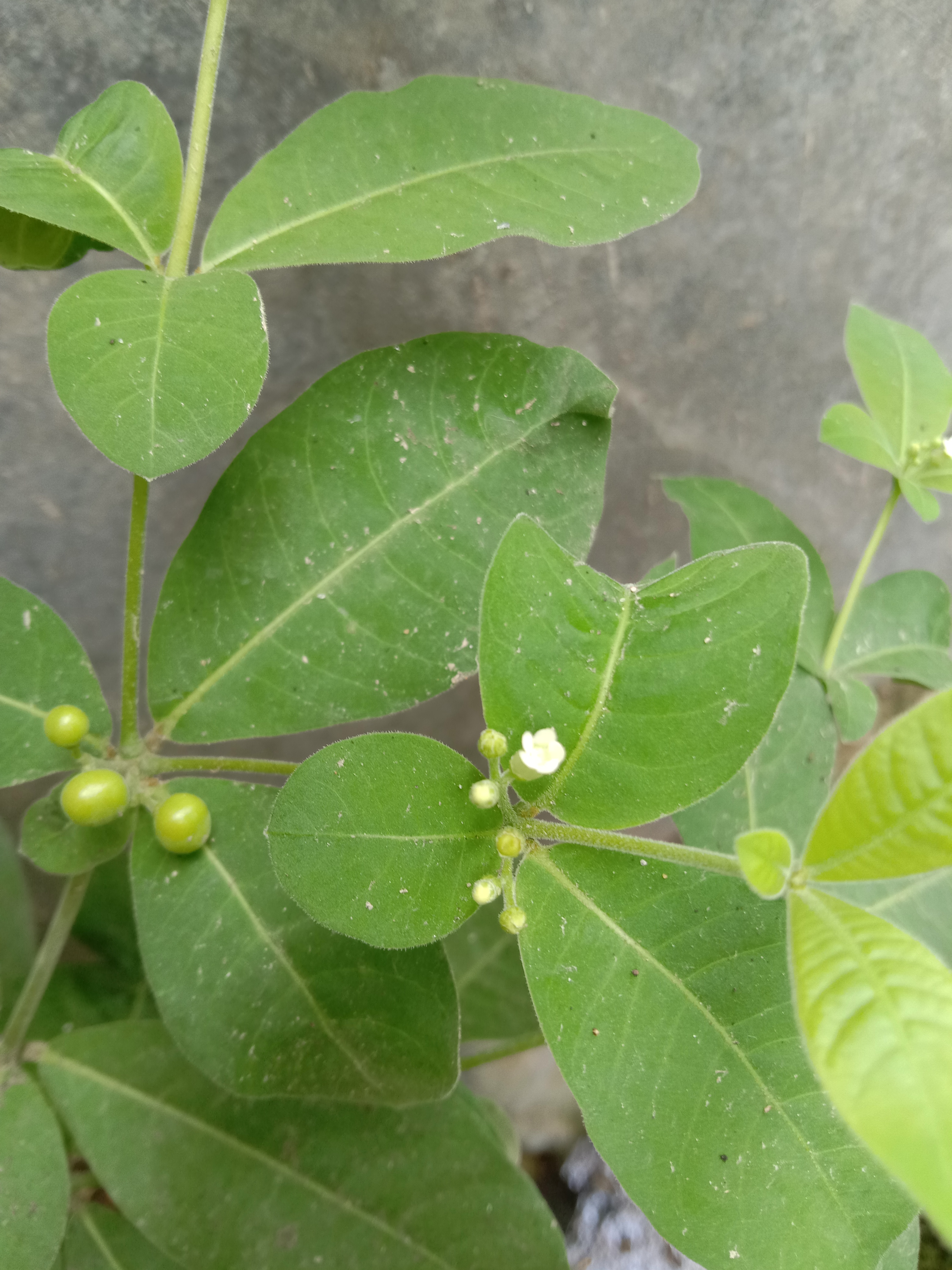
Flower and fruits in West Bengal, India.

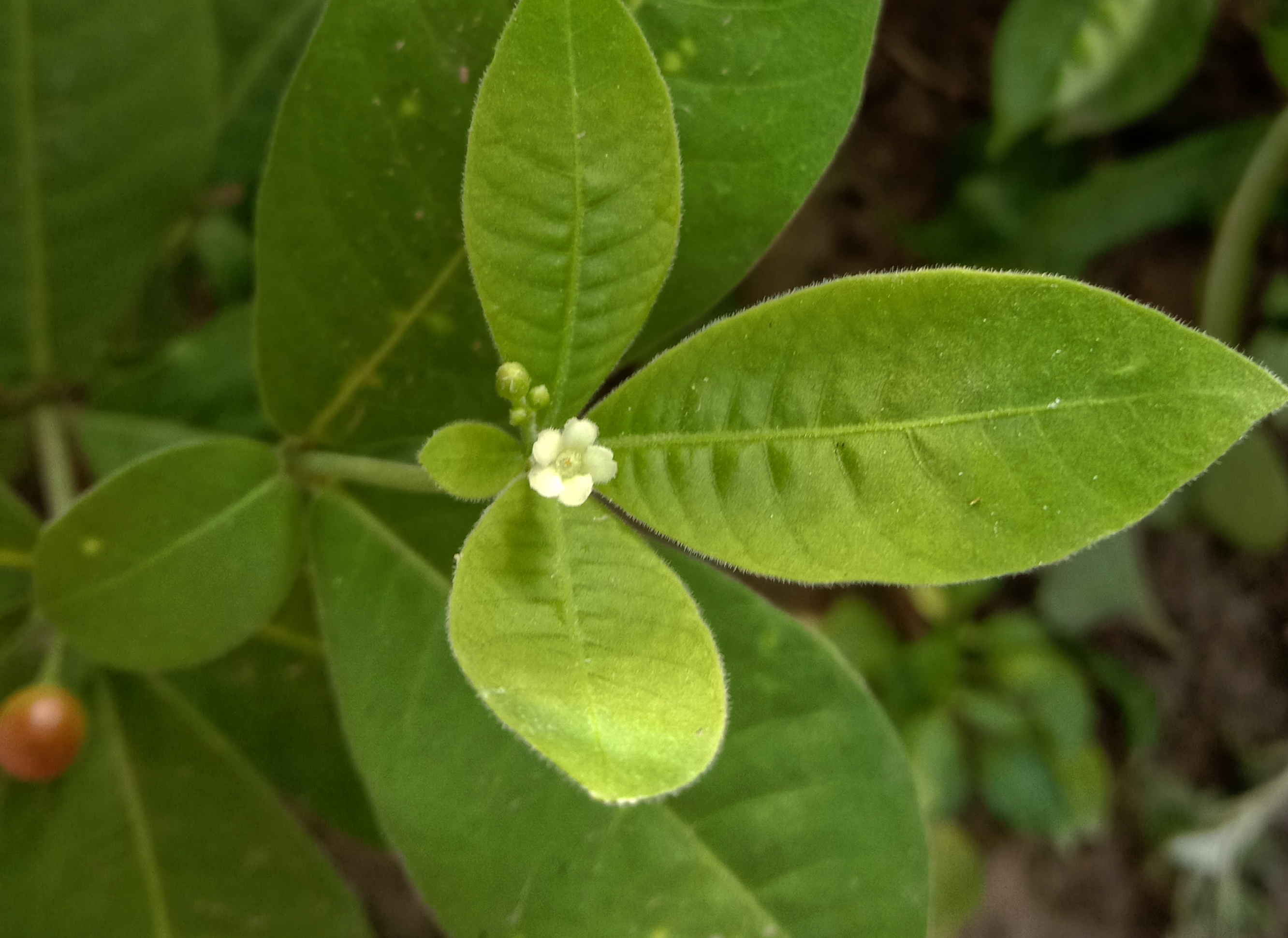
A tiny white flower of Rauvolfia tetraphylla

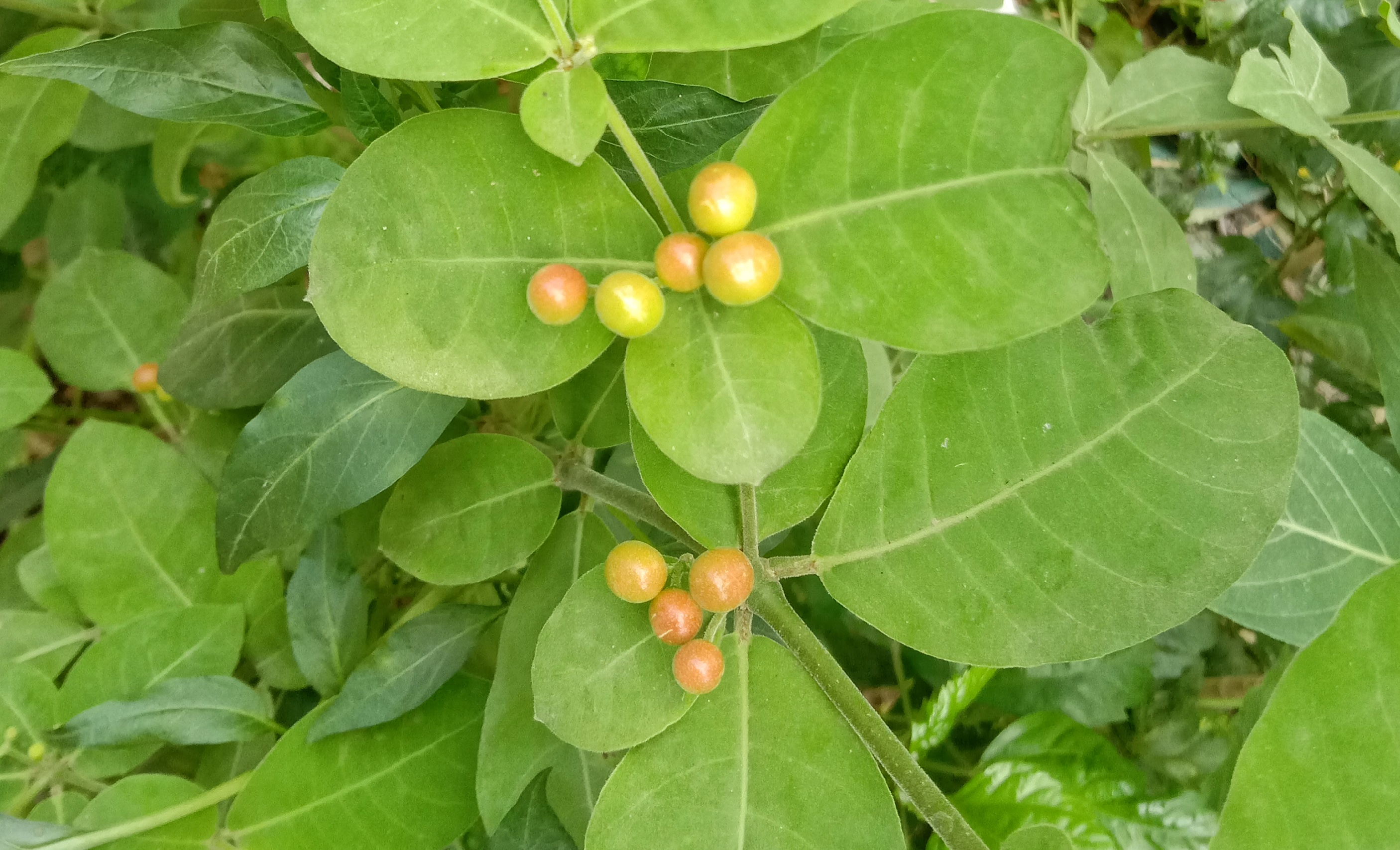
Fruits of devil-pepper (Rauvolfia tetraphylla) in West Bengal, India.

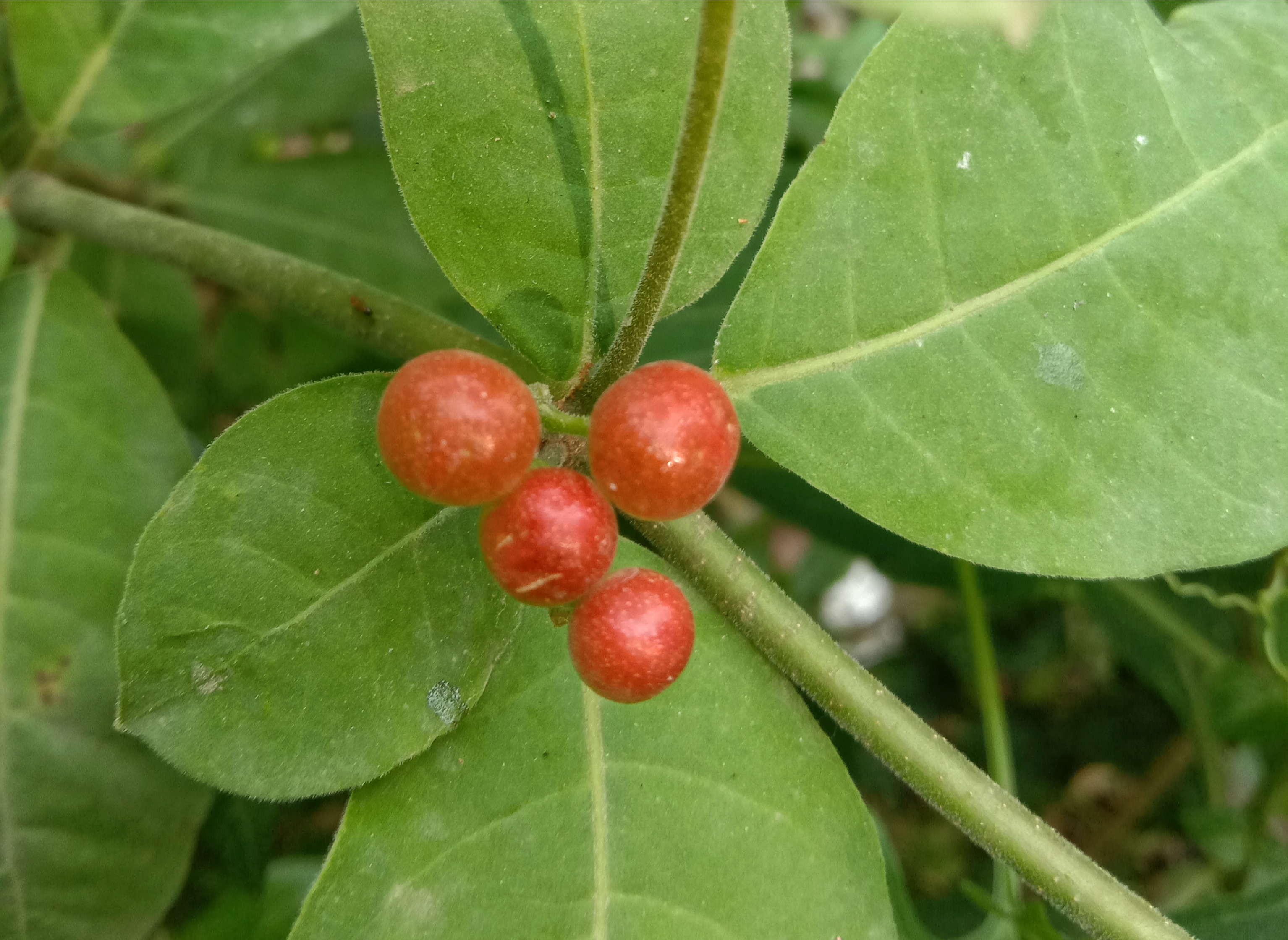
Close-up of fruits

Rauvolfia tetraphylla fruits are called devil-peppers and hold an important position in the Indian traditional system of medicine. The plant has various significance and it is widely used by South Indian tribes.

Asima Chatterjee initiated chemical investigation of alkaloids in Rauvolfia tetraphylla then known as Rauwolfia canescens. Indole alkaloids including serpentine, reserpine, serpentinine, and other Rauwolfia alkaloids were identified in phytochemical study.

== Image Gallery ==
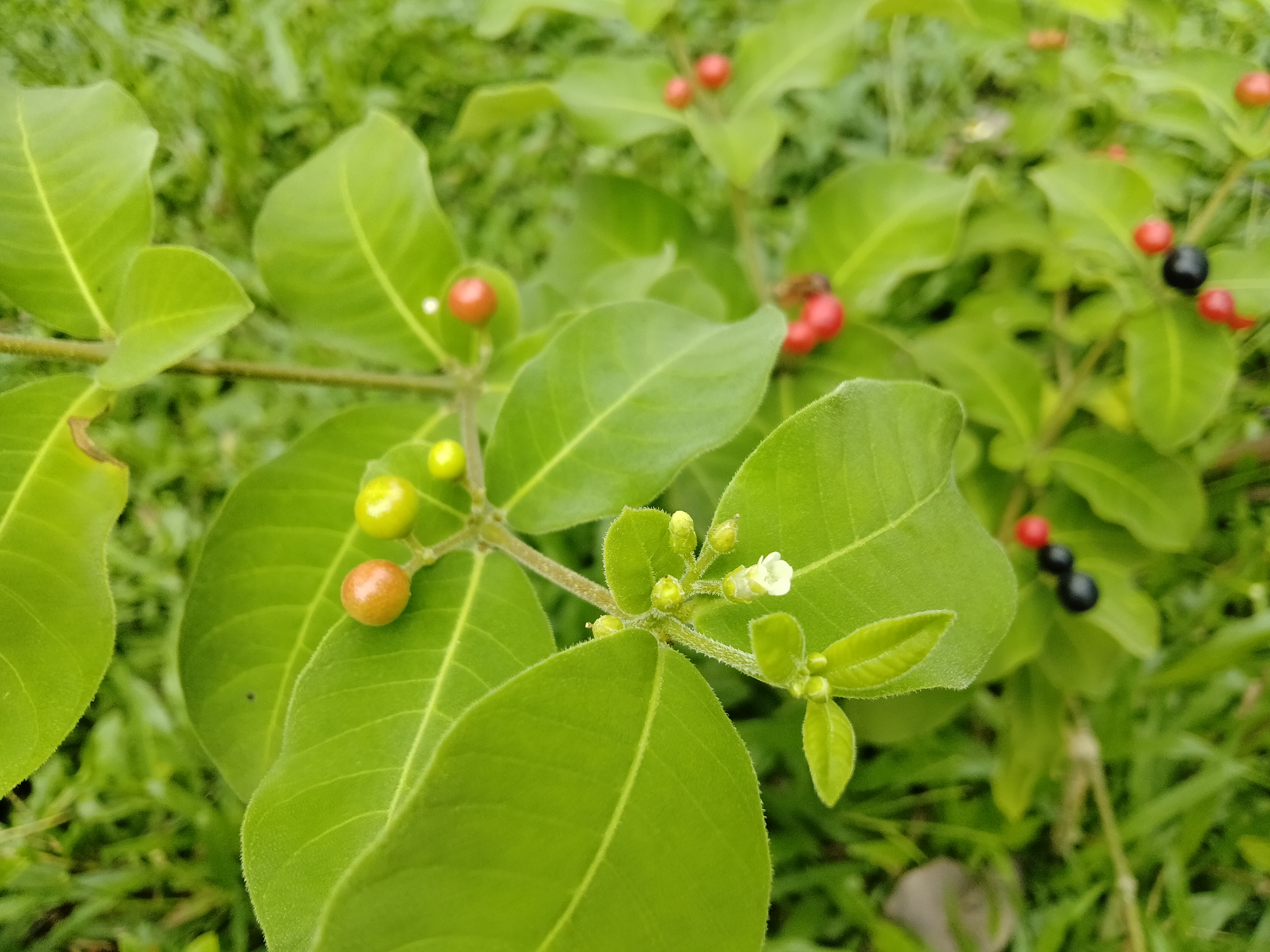

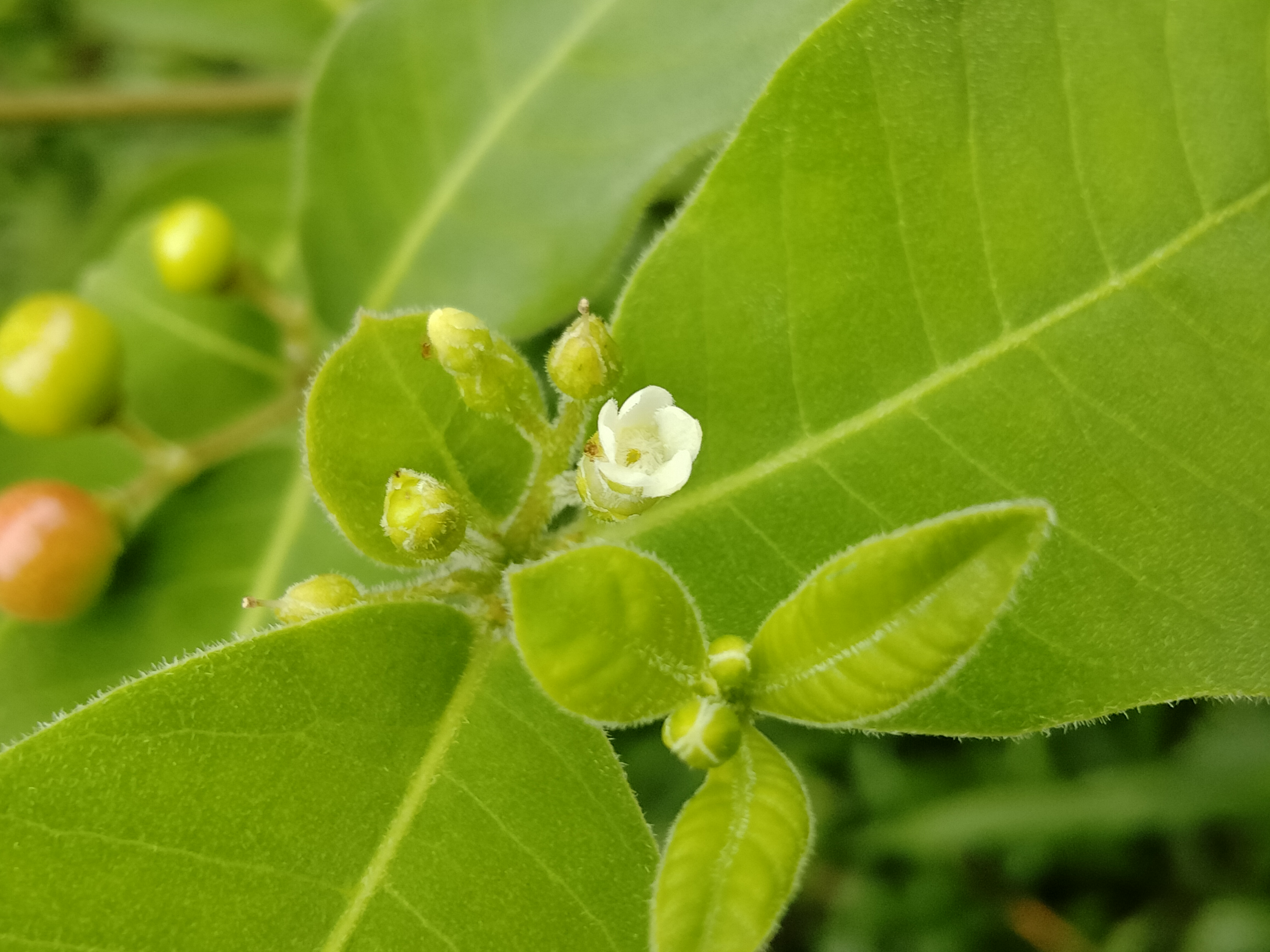

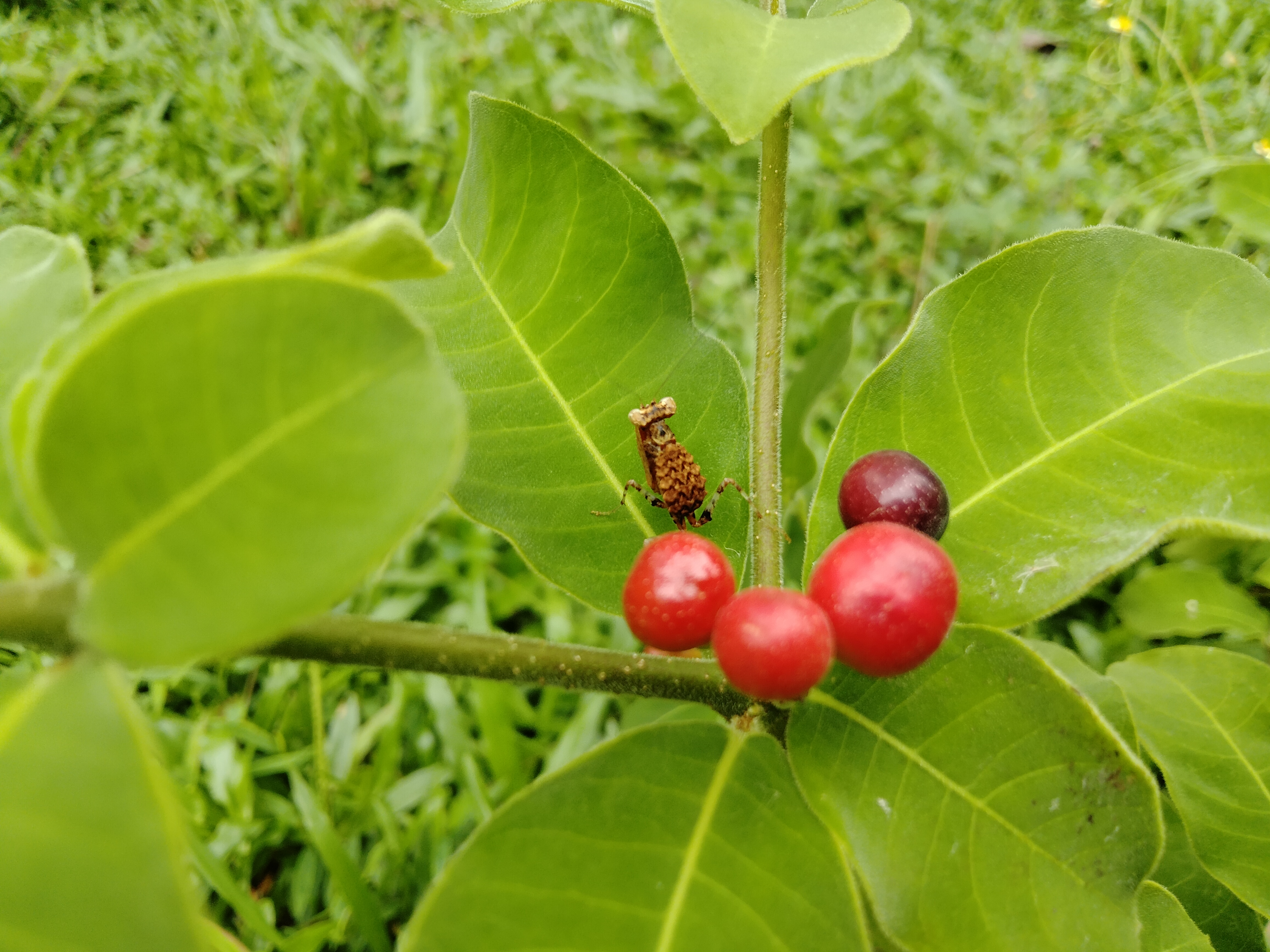

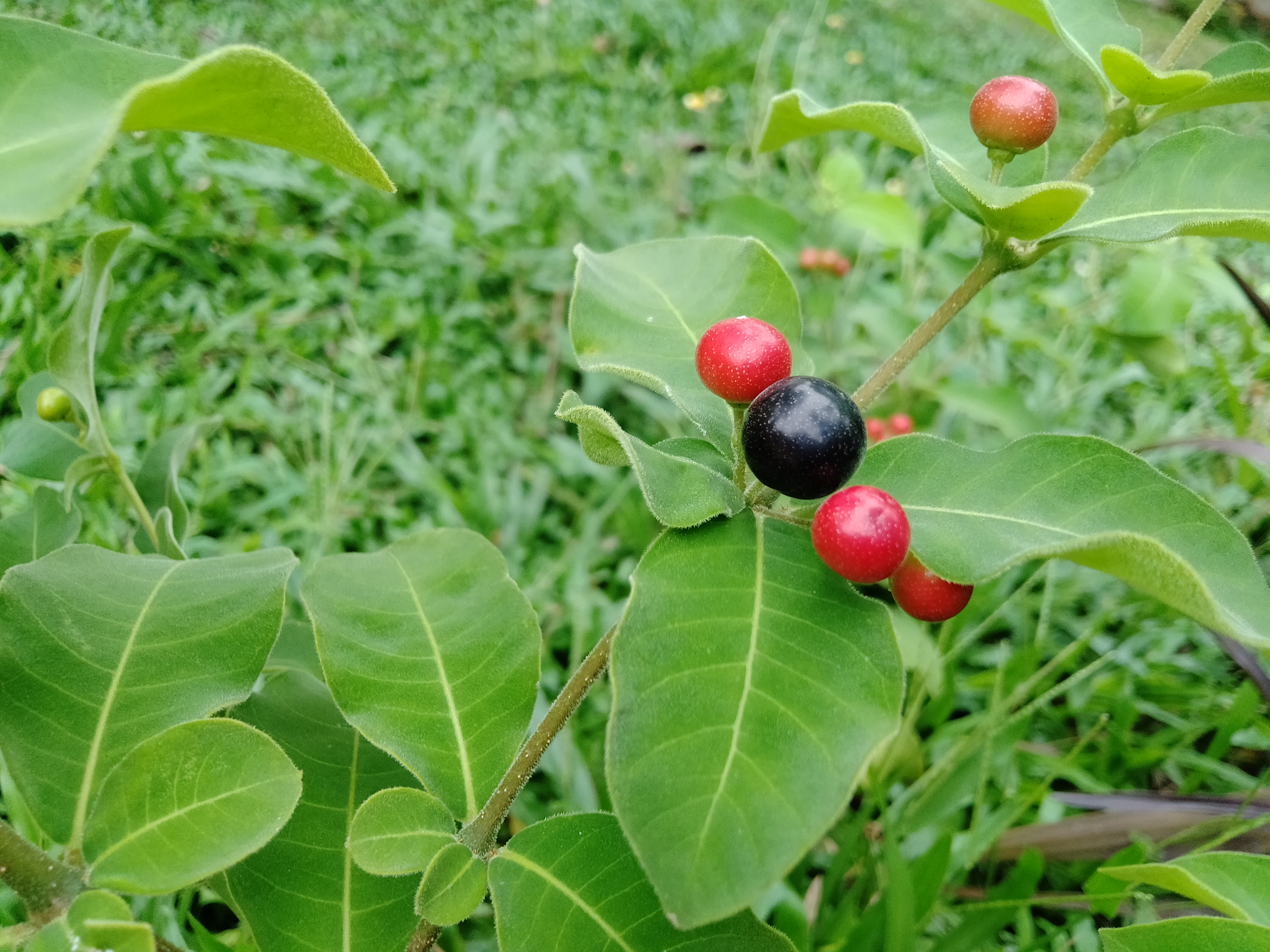
