= Alstonia longifolia =

Conservation status
- Least Concern (IUCN 3.1)

Scientific classification
- Kingdom: Plantae
- Clade: Tracheophytes
- Clade: Angiosperms
- Clade: Eudicots
- Clade: Asterids
- Order: Gentianales
- Family: Apocynaceae
- Genus: Alstonia
- Species: A. longifolia

Binomial name
- Alstonia longifolia (A.DC.) Pichon

Synonyms
- Alstonia macrantha (Woodson) A.Gentry.; Alstonia pittieri (Donn.Sm.) A.H.Gentry; Alstonia stenophylla (Donn.Sm.) J.F.Morales nom. illeg.; Carissa verticillata Sessé & Moc.; Rauvolfia longifolia A.DC.; Rauvolfia stenophylla Donn.Sm.; Tonduzia longifolia (A.DC.) Markgr.; Tonduzia longipedunculata Woodson; Tonduzia macrantha Woodson; Tonduzia parvifolia Pittier; Tonduzia pittieri Donn.Sm.; Tonduzia stenophylla (Donn.Sm.) Pittier

Species of tree

Alstonia longifolia is a plant species in the genus Alstonia, family Apocynaceae. It is native to southern Mexico and Guatemala at an elevation of 1400–1800 m.

This is a tree up to 11 m (36 ft) tall. It is distinguished from related species by its corolla tube 7–10 mm (0.28–0.39 in) long, with obovate lobes 4 mm–6 mm × 2 mm–3 mm (0.157 in–0.236 in × 0.079 in–0.118 in).
