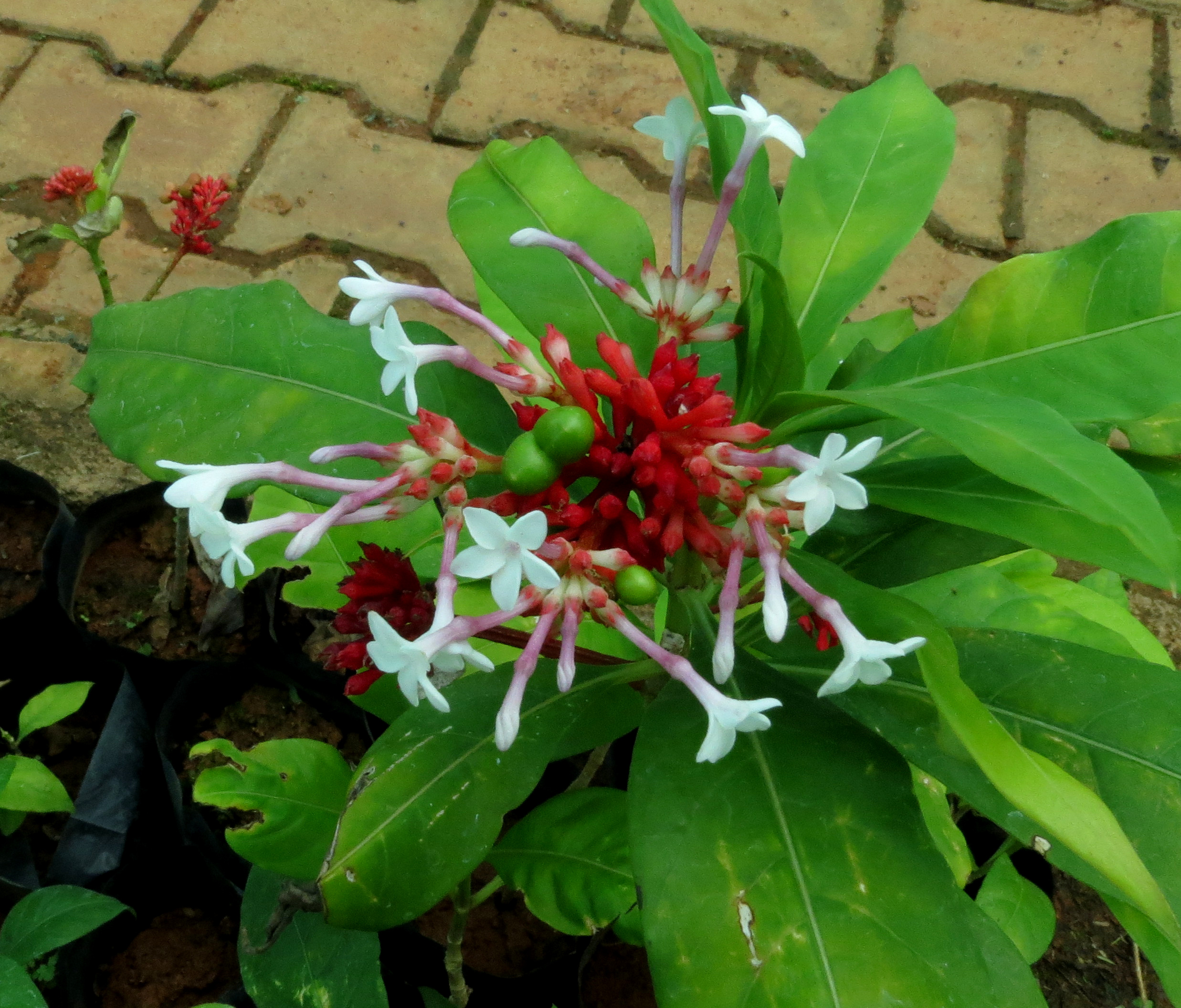

Conservation status
- CITES Appendix II (CITES)

Scientific classification
- Kingdom: Plantae
- Clade: Tracheophytes
- Clade: Angiosperms
- Clade: Eudicots
- Clade: Asterids
- Order: Gentianales
- Family: Apocynaceae
- Genus: Rauvolfia
- Species: R. serpentina

Binomial name
- Rauvolfia serpentina (L.) Benth. ex Kurz

Synonyms
- Ophioxylon album Gaertn.; Ophioxylon obversum Miq.; Ophioxylon salutiferum Salisb.; Ophioxylon serpentinum L.; Ophioxylon trifoliatum Gaertn.; Rauvolfia obversa (Miq.) Baill.; Rauvolfia trifoliata (Gaertn.) Baill.

= Rauvolfia serpentina =

Species of plant

Rauvolfia serpentina, the Indian snakeroot, devil pepper, serpentine wood, Sarpagandha (as known locally) or Chandrika, is a species of flower in the milkweed family Apocynaceae. It is native to the Indian subcontinent and East Asia (from India to Indonesia).

Rauvolfia is a perennial undershrub widely distributed in India in the sub-Himalayan regions up to 1,000 metres (3,300 ft).

Sarpagandha is used in folk medicine in India for centuries to treat a wide variety of maladies, including snake and insect bites, febrile conditions, malaria, abdominal pain, and dysentery. It was also used as a uterine stimulant, febrifuge, and cure for insanity. The plant was mentioned in Hindu manuscripts as long ago as 1000 BCE.

== Chemical composition ==
Rauvolfia serpentina contains dozens of alkaloids of the indole alkaloid family, including ajmaline, ajmalicine, reserpine, and serpentine, among others.

== Research ==
A 2016 review found that reserpine reduced systolic blood pressure (SBP) by about 8 mmHg compared to placebo, and may be as effective at reducing SBP as other front-line hypertensive drugs, although more research is needed to determine a dose-specific safety profile.

== Potential adverse effects ==
R. serpentina may cause adverse effects by interacting with various prescription drugs or via interference with mechanisms of mental depression or peptic ulcer. The reserpine in R. serpentina is associated with diverse adverse effects, including vomiting, diarrhea, dizziness, headache, anxiety, or hypersensitivity reactions.

== Gallery ==
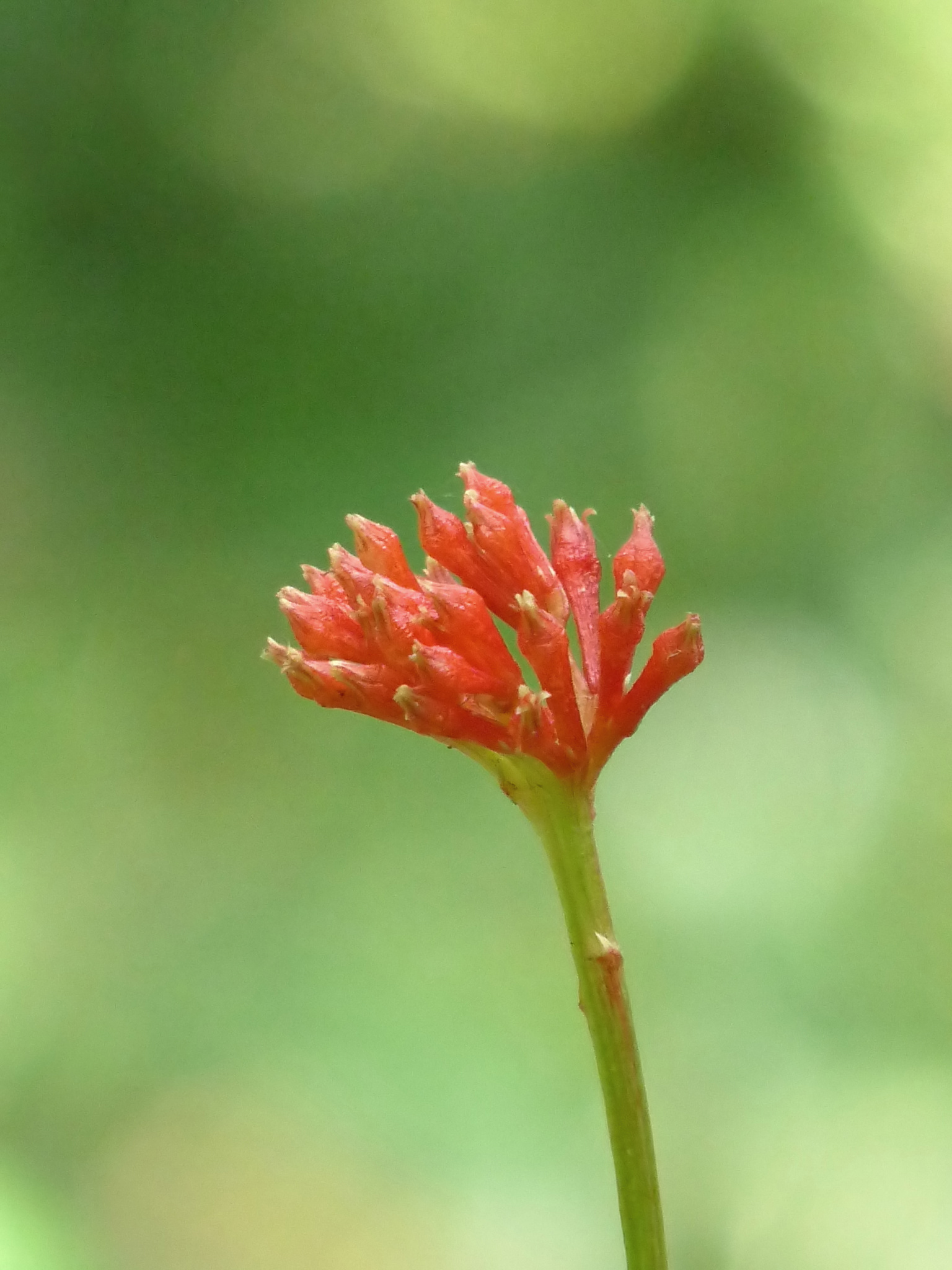
Flower

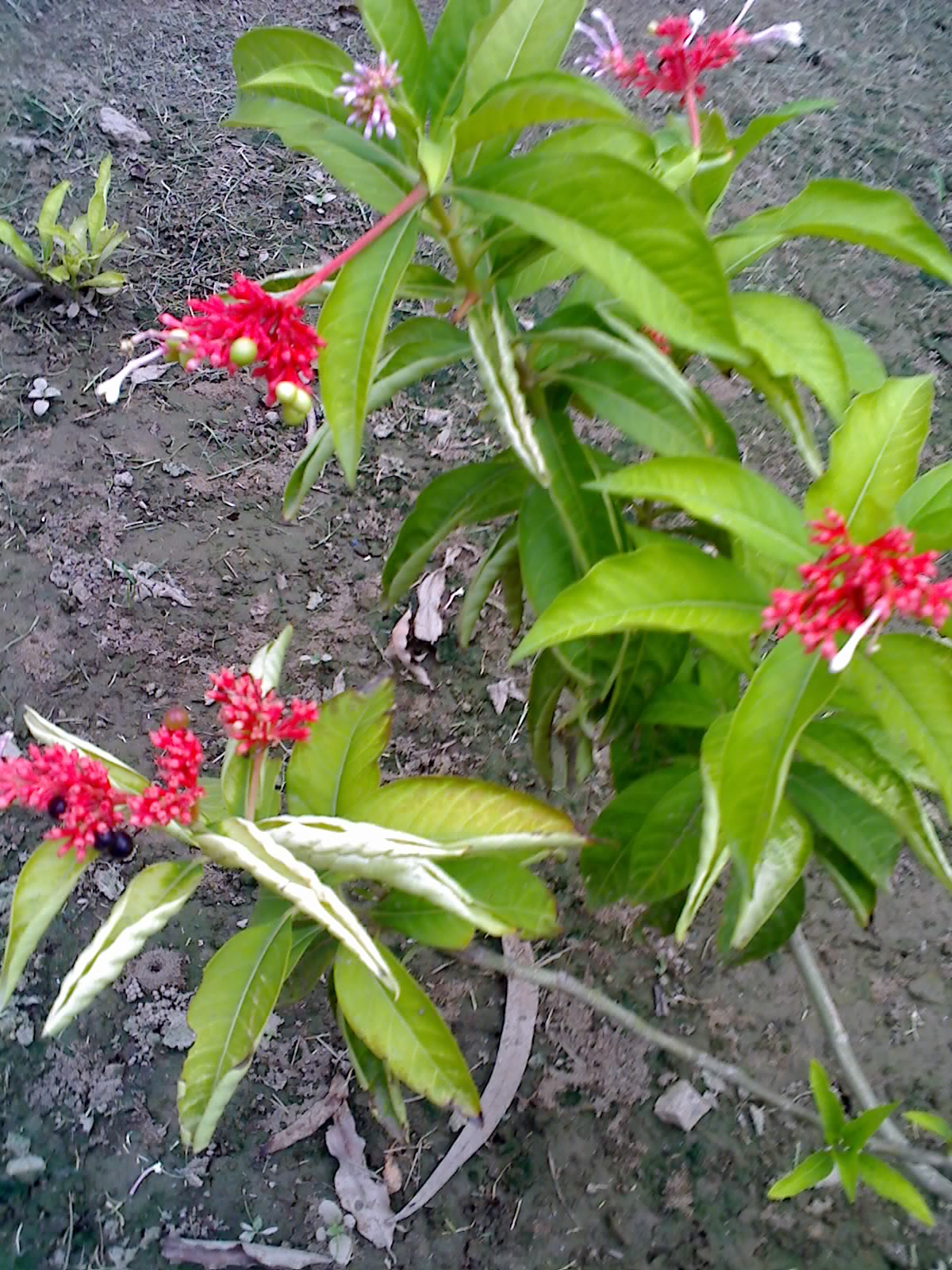
Flowers and leaves

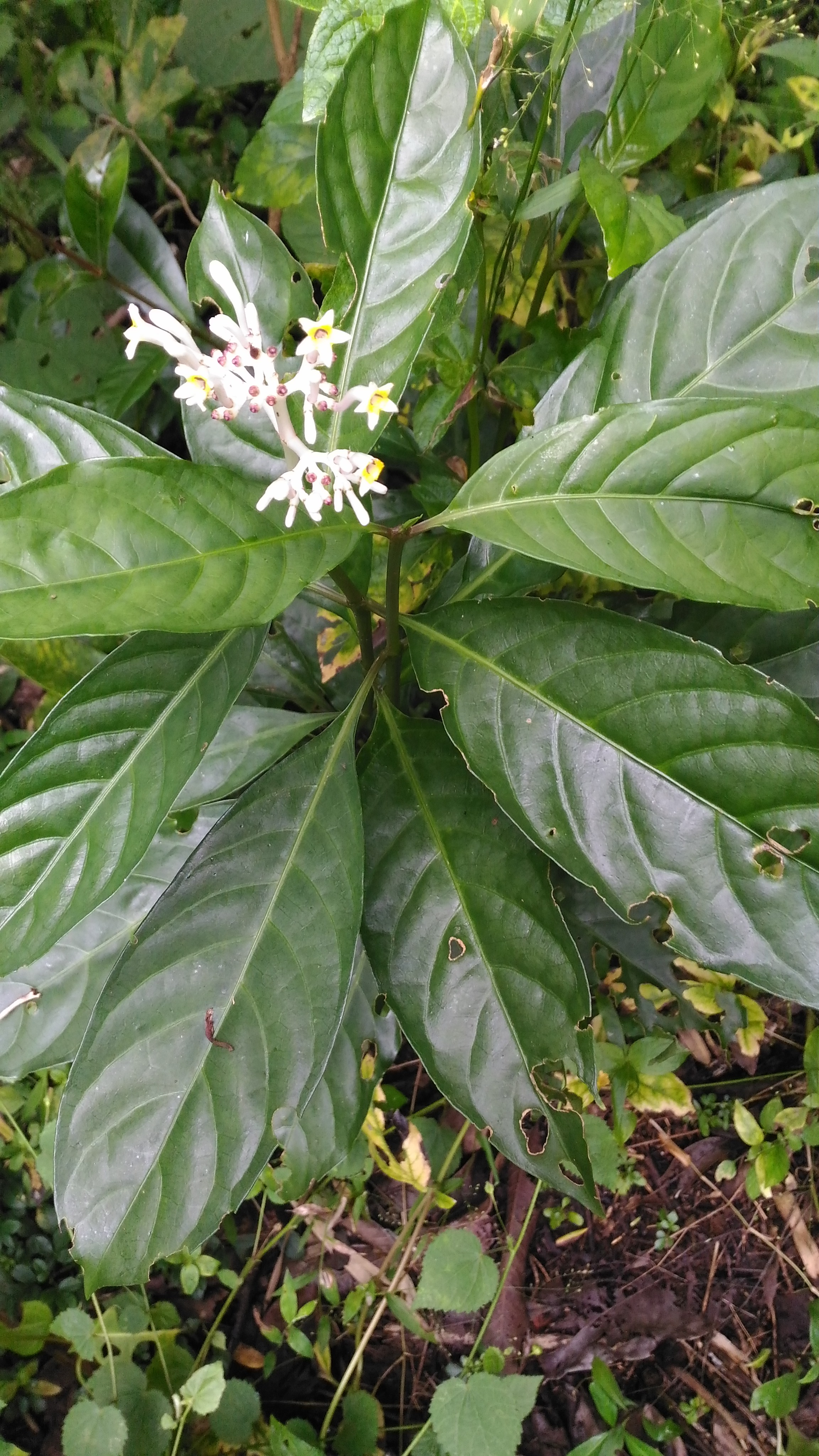
Maturing flower

== See also ==
- Reserpine
- List of herbs with known adverse effects
