= Apocynaceae alkaloids =

Natural product found in plants

Apocynaceae alkaloids are natural products found in the plant family of the dogbane family (Apocynaceae).

== Occurrence ==
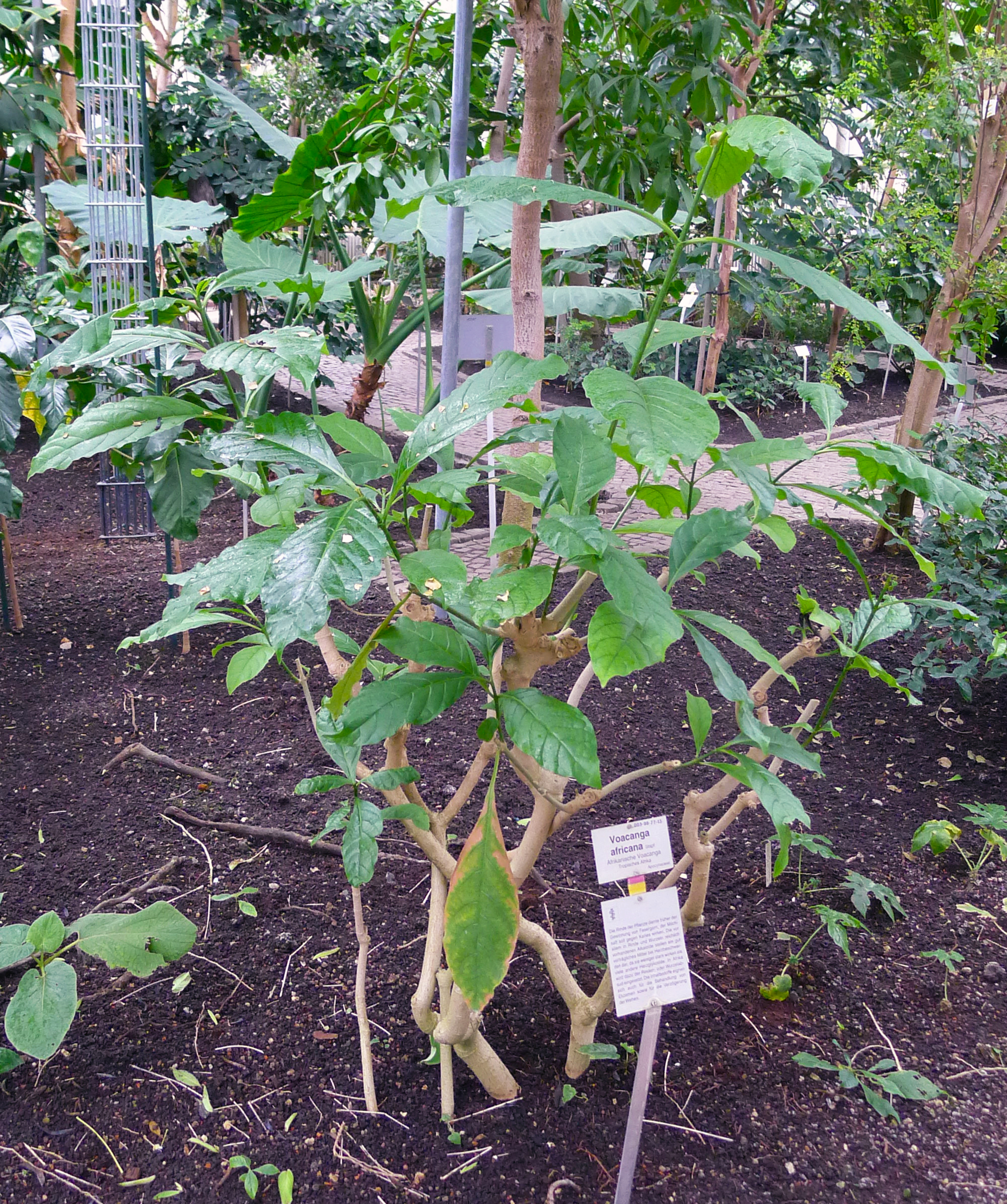
Voacanga africana

The alkaloid tabernanthin is found in Tabernaemontana laurifolia. The alkaloids voacangin and voacristin were isolated from Voacanga africana.

== Representatives ==
Representatives include tabernanthine, voacangine and voacristine.

(-)-Voacangine

(-)-Voacristine

Tabernanthine

== Uses ==
Plant parts of Voacanga africana are utilized by African natives for various purposes, including as hallucinogens, in cultic ceremonies, and as aphrodisiacs.

=== Ethnomedicinal use ===
A decoction made from the stem or root bark is employed for the treatment of mental disorders and as an analgesic. The sap is applied to cavities in teeth. In southeastern Nigeria, Voacanga africana is an integral part of numerous healing rituals.
