= Perakine =

Names
- IUPAC name [(1R,10S,13R,14S,16S,18R)-13-formyl-14-methyl-8,15-diazahexacyclo[14.2.1.0^{1,9}.0^{2,7}.0^{10,15}.0^{12,17}]nonadeca-2,4,6,8-tetraen-18-yl] acetate
- Other names Raucaffrine

Identifiers
CAS Number	4382-56-3
3D model (JSmol)	Interactive image
ChEBI	CHEBI:63168
ChemSpider	8535968
PubChem CID	453213
CompTox Dashboard (EPA)	DTXSID60963122
- InChI: InChI=1S/C21H22N2O3/c1-10-13(9-24)12-7-16-19-21(14-5-3-4-6-15(14)22-19)8-17(23(10)16)18(12)20(21)26-11(2)25/h3-6,9-10,12-13,16-18,20H,7-8H2,1-2H3/t10-,12?,13-,16-,17-,18?,20+,21+/m0/s1 Key: GDXJMOGWONJRHL-HWUILILVSA-N
- SMILES: C[C@H]1[C@@H](C2C[C@@H]3N1[C@@H]4C2[C@H]([C@@]5(C4)C3=NC6=CC=CC=C56)OC(=O)C)C=O

Properties
Chemical formula	C_{21}H_{22}N_{2}O_{3}
Molar mass	350.418 g·mol^{−1}
- Except where otherwise noted, data are given for materials in their standard state (at 25 °C [77 °F], 100 kPa). Infobox references

Perakine is an indole alkaloid isolated from the leaves of Rauvolfia yunnanensis.
