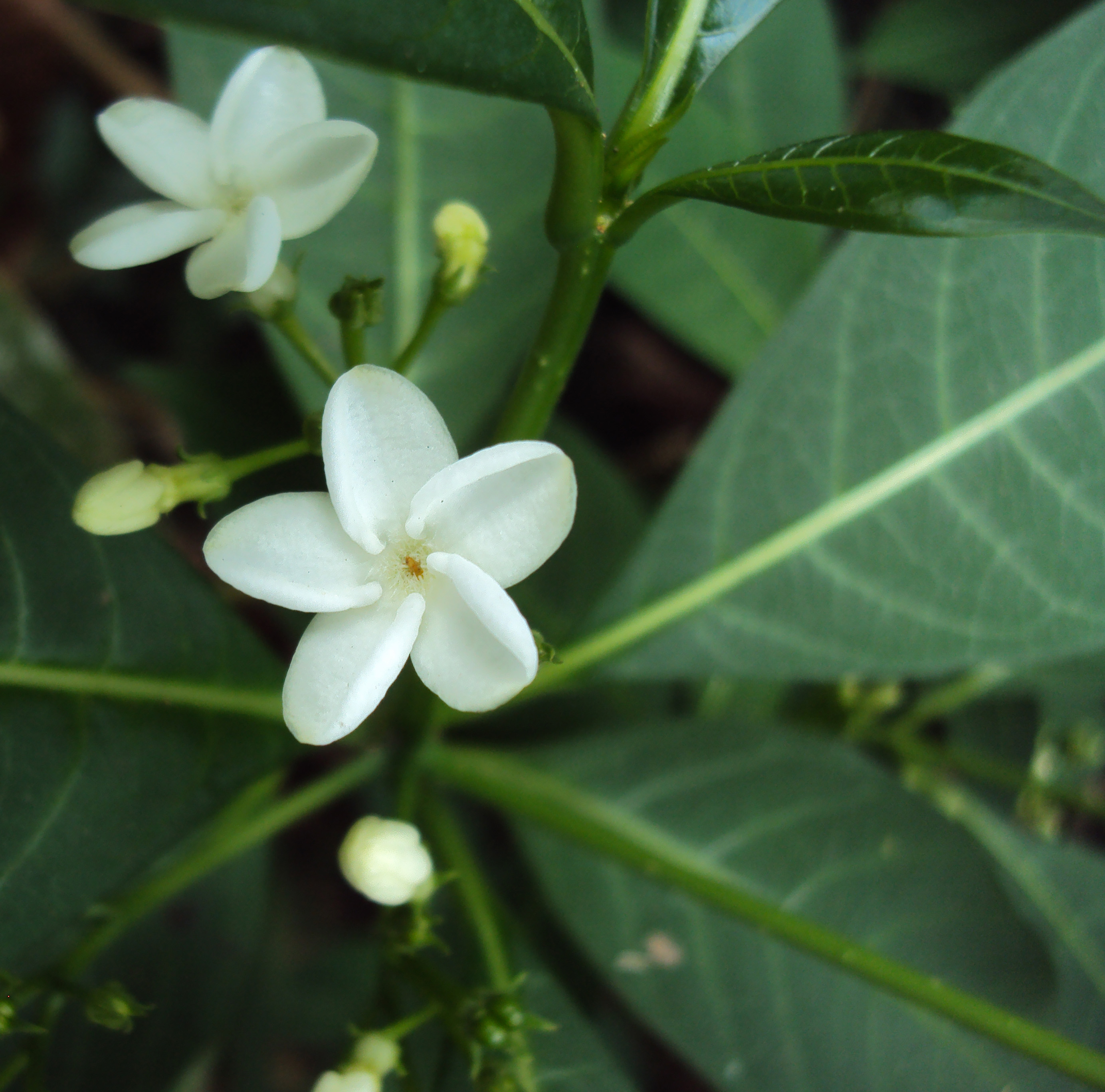

Conservation status
- Least Concern (IUCN 3.1)

Scientific classification
- Kingdom: Plantae
- Clade: Embryophytes
- Clade: Tracheophytes
- Clade: Spermatophytes
- Clade: Angiosperms
- Clade: Eudicots
- Clade: Asterids
- Order: Gentianales
- Family: Apocynaceae
- Genus: Rauvolfia
- Species: R. verticillata

Binomial name
- Rauvolfia verticillata (Lour.) Baill.

Synonyms
- List: Dissolena verticillata Lour.; Ophioxylon chinense Hance; Rauvolfia chinensis (Hance) Hemsl.; Cerbera chinensis Spreng.; Ervatamia ophiorhizoides (Kurz) Lace; Ervatamia ventii Lý; Hunteria sundana Miq.; Hunteria sundana var. minor Miq.; Ophioxylon belgaumense Wight; Ophioxylon densiflorum (Wall.) Thwaites; Ophioxylon macrocarpum Wight; Ophioxylon majus Hassk.; Ophioxylon neilgheerense Wight; Ophioxylon zeylanicum Wight; Rauvolfia altodiscifera R.H.Miao; Rauvolfia brevistyla Tsiang; Rauvolfia densiflora (Wall.) Benth. ex Hook.f.; Rauvolfia densiflora var. macrophylla Hook.f.; Rauvolfia latifrons Tsiang; Rauvolfia loheri Merr.; Rauvolfia major (Hassk.) G.Nicholson; Rauvolfia membranacea Merr.; Rauvolfia obversa Koord.; Rauvolfia ophiorrhizoides (Kurz) Kerr; Rauvolfia peguana Hook.f.; Rauvolfia perakensis King & Gamble; Rauvolfia serpentina var. gracilis Stapf; Rauvolfia superaxillaris P.T.Li & S.Z.Huang; Rauvolfia taiwanensis Tsiang; Rauvolfia verticillata var. hainanensis Tsiang; Rauvolfia verticillata var. macrophylla (Hook.f.) Karthik. & Moorthy; Rauvolfia verticillata var. oblanceolata Tsiang; Rauvolfia verticillata var. officinalis Tsiang; Rauvolfia yunnanensis Tsiang; Tabernaemontana cylindrica Steud.; Tabernaemontana densiflora Wall.; Tabernaemontana microcarpa Wall.; Tabernaemontana ophiorrhizoides Kurz; Tabernaemontana parviflora B.Heyne ex Wall.; Tabernaemontana subcapitata Hook.f. & Thomson; Tabernaemontana wallichiana Steud.

= Rauvolfia verticillata =

Species of plant

Rauvolfia verticillata, the common devil pepper, is a plant in the family Apocynaceae. The specific epithet verticillata means 'whorled' and refers to the plant's leaves.

== Description ==
Rauvolfia verticillata grows as a shrub or small tree, up to 5 m (16 ft) tall. The bark is yellowish black or brown. Inflorescences bear up to 35 or more flowers. The flowers feature a white or pinkish corolla. The fruits are whitish purple when ripe, ovoid in shape, measuring up to 1.4 cm (0.6 in) long.

== Distribution and habitat ==
Rauvolfia verticillata is native to China, Taiwan and tropical Asia from India east to the Philippines. It grows in a variety of habitats, including forests and savannas, from sea level to 2,000 m (6,600 ft) altitude.

== Uses ==
Rauvolfia verticillata is used in traditional Chinese medicine, including as a treatment for snakebite, malaria, typhus and hypertension. The root may be locally used as a sedative and the leaves are used in the treatment of wounds.

== Conservation ==
Rauvolfia verticillata has been assessed as least concern on the IUCN Red List. It is threatened by deforestation and by conversion of its habitat for agriculture and urban development. The species is present in a number of protected areas.
