= William L. Wilson (nanoscientist) =

American nanoscientist

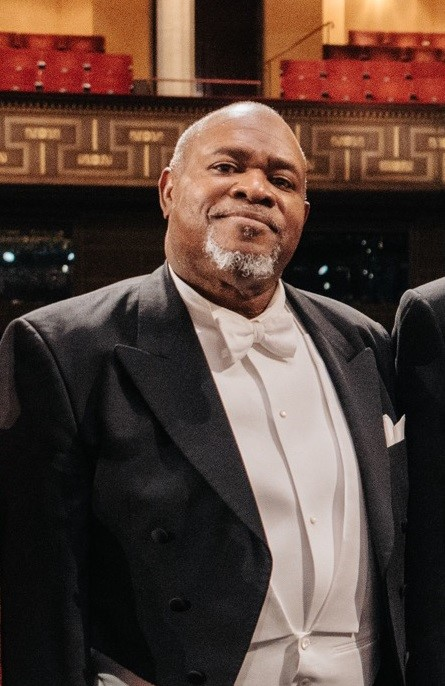
William L. Wilson at the 2023 Nobel Prize Ceremony

William L. Wilson is an American chemist. He serves as the Executive Director of the Center for Nanoscale Systems (CNS) at Harvard University. At Bell Labs, Wilson collaborated with 2023 Nobel Prize in Chemistry awardees, Louis Brus and Moungi Bawendi, in the early development and characterization of colloidal semi-conductor nanocrystals known as quantum dots. As an expert in holographic technologies, Wilson co-founded InPhase Technologies and served as their Chief Scientific Officer.

== Early life ==
William L. Wilson earned a BSc in Chemistry in 1982 from Saint Joseph's University in Philadelphia, PA. He earned a Ph.D. in Physical Chemistry in 1988 at Stanford University.

== Career ==
=== Bell Labs ===
Wilson spent 13 years at Bell Labs where he focused on ultrafast photophysics and developed advanced characterization techniques for studying nanomaterials. He worked with 2023 Nobel Prize in Chemistry awardees, Louis Brus and Moungi Bawendi, to do time-resolved and steady-state spectroscopy experiments on quantum dots. Wilson published one of the first reports of silicon quantum dots in the early 1990s demonstrating luminescence from freestanding oxidized silicon quantum dots.

Wilson shifted his research focus to the characterization of semiconducting polymers. He studied photodynamics and transport behavior in silicon backbone polymeric systems. He was a pioneer in photoconductivity and the doping dynamics of thin films.

=== InPhase Technologies ===
Wilson was instrumental in optical technologies, including the development of semiconductor laser devices for low cost, high speed optical communication systems, external cavity GaN lasers for optical storage, and multi-wavelength sources for DWDM applications. In 2001, Wilson co-founded InPhase Technologies as a spinoff company from Bell Labs and served as the Chief Scientific Officer. The company developed high-performance optical data storage.

=== Academia ===
In 2009, Wilson moved to academia, serving as Associate Research Professor in Material Science and Engineering and the Associate Director of the Integrated Imaging Center at Johns Hopkins University. In 2011, he moved to the Faculty of the Materials Science and Engineering Department and the Directorship of the Central Research Facilities of the Frederick Seitz Materials Research Laboratory (MRL) at the University of Illinois at Urbana-Champaign. In 2015, Wilson became the Executive Director at the Center for Nanoscale Systems at Harvard University.

Wilson has published more than 100 papers, co-authored a book on Holographic Data Storage, and has been granted more than 30 US and international patents.
