= Carbazole =

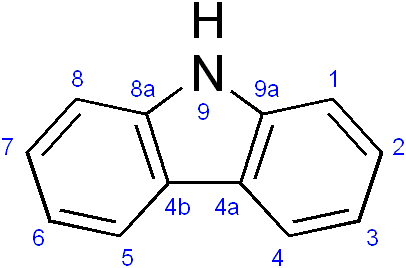

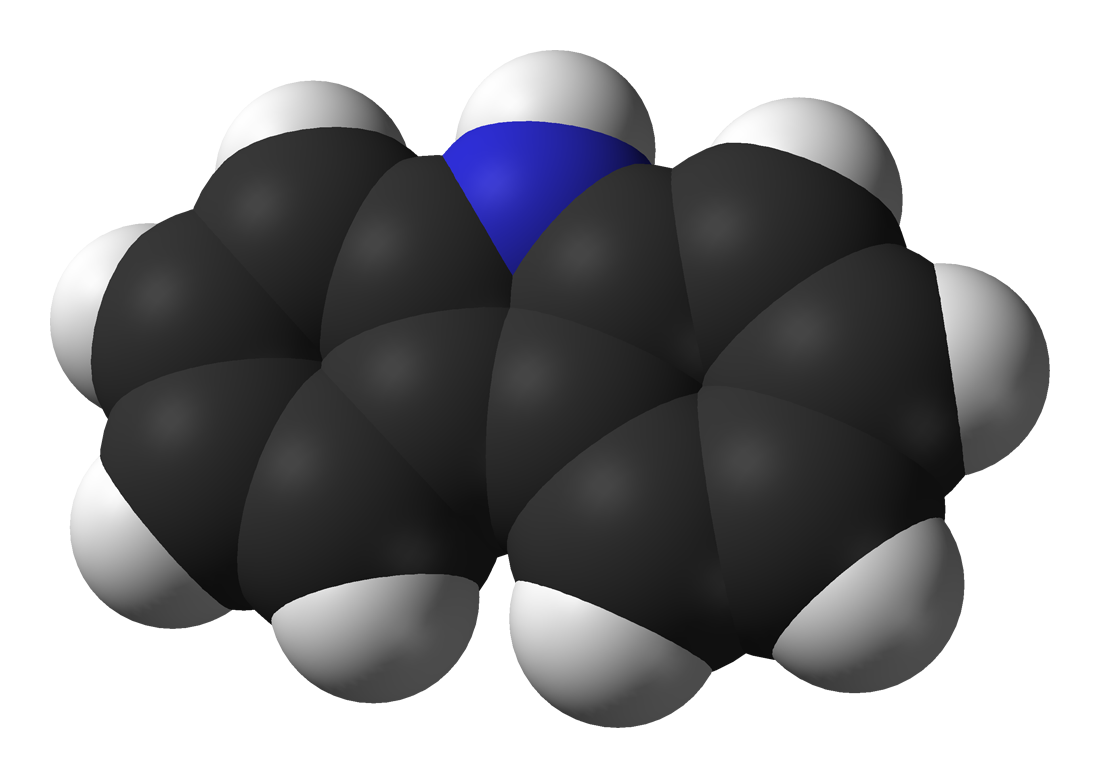

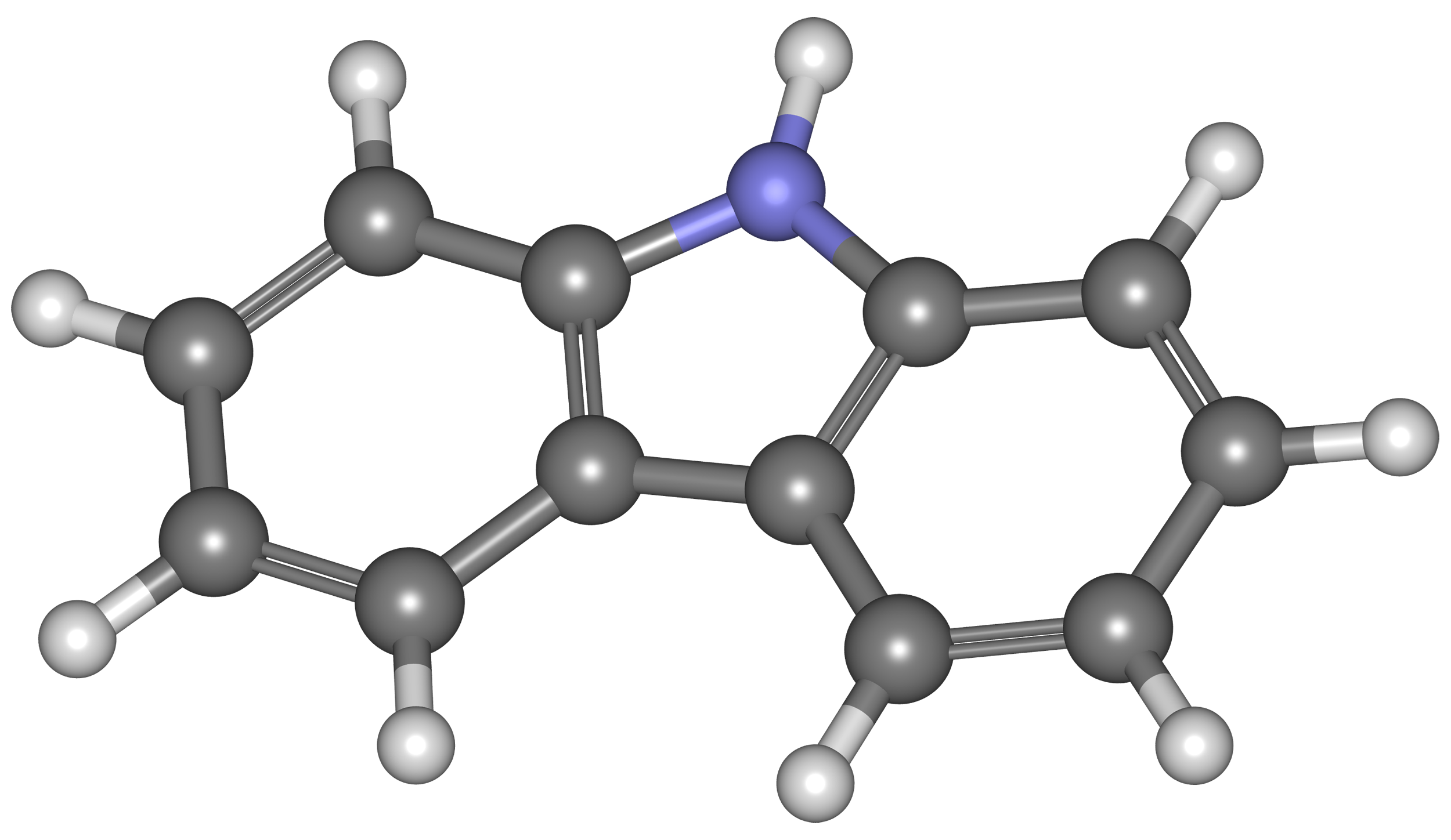

Names
- Preferred IUPAC name 9H-Carbazole
- Other names 9-azafluorene dibenzopyrrole diphenylenimine diphenyleneimide USAF EK-600

Identifiers
CAS Number	86-74-8
3D model (JSmol)	Interactive image
Beilstein Reference	3956
ChEBI	CHEBI:27543
ChEMBL	ChEMBL243580
ChemSpider	6593
DrugBank	DB07301
ECHA InfoCard	100.001.542
EC Number	201-696-0
Gmelin Reference	102490
KEGG	C08060
PubChem CID	6854
RTECS number	FE3150000
UNII	0P2197HHHN
CompTox Dashboard (EPA)	DTXSID4020248
- InChI: InChI=1S/C12H9N/c1-3-7-11-9(5-1)10-6-2-4-8-12(10)13-11/h1-8,13H Key: UJOBWOGCFQCDNV-UHFFFAOYSA-N; InChI=1/C12H9N/c1-3-7-11-9(5-1)10-6-2-4-8-12(10)13-11/h1-8,13H Key: UJOBWOGCFQCDNV-UHFFFAOYAV
- SMILES: c1ccc2c(c1)c3ccccc3[nH]2

Properties
Chemical formula	C_{12}H_{9}N
Molar mass	167.211 g·mol^{−1}
Density	1.301 g cm^{−3}
Melting point	246.3 °C (475.3 °F; 519.5 K)
Boiling point	354.69 °C (670.44 °F; 627.84 K)
Magnetic susceptibility (χ)	−117.4 × 10^{−6} cm^{3} mol^{−1}

Hazards
- GHS labelling
Pictograms	(GHS08: Health hazard) (GHS09: Environmental hazard)
Signal word	Warning
Hazard statements	H341, H351, H400, H411, H413
Precautionary statements	P201, P202, P273, P281, P308+P313, P391, P405, P501
Flash point	220 °C (428 °F; 493 K)
- Except where otherwise noted, data are given for materials in their standard state (at 25 °C [77 °F], 100 kPa). verify (what is ?) Infobox references

Carbazole is an aromatic heterocyclic organic compound. It has a tricyclic structure, consisting of two six-membered benzene rings fused on either side of a five-membered nitrogen-containing ring. The compound's structure is based on the indole structure, but in which a second benzene ring is fused onto the five-membered ring at the 2–3 position of indole (equivalent to the 9a–4a double bond in carbazole, respectively).

Carbazole is a constituent of tobacco smoke.

== History ==
Carl Graebe and Carl Glaser first isolated the compound from coal tar in 1872.

== Production ==
Several routes exist beginning with extraction from coal tar by distillation. Carbazole concentrates in the anthracene distillate and is removed before anthraquinone production; that waste product is the major industrial carbazole source. Polar compounds (e.g., ketones) selectively precipitate it from the anthracene; a more modern technique is simply selective crystallization from molten coal tar at high temperature or low pressure (70 mmHg).

Preparative methods:

- Tetrahydrocarbazole, readily available via the Borsche–Drechsel cyclization, is oxidized by red lead to carbazole.
- Another classic is the Bucherer carbazole synthesis, which uses a naphthol and an aryl hydrazine.

Bucherer carbazole synthesis

- A third method for the synthesis of carbazole is the Graebe–Ullmann reaction.

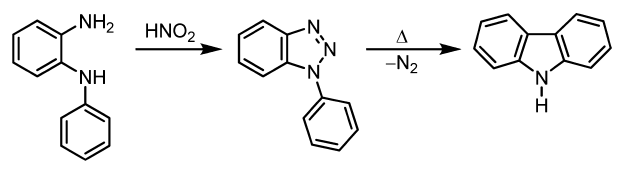
Graebe–Ullmann reaction

In the first step, an N-phenyl-1,2-diaminobenzene (N-phenyl-o-phenylenediamine) is converted into a diazonium salt which instantaneously forms a 1,2,3-triazole. The triazole is unstable and at elevated temperatures, nitrogen is released and the carbazole is formed.

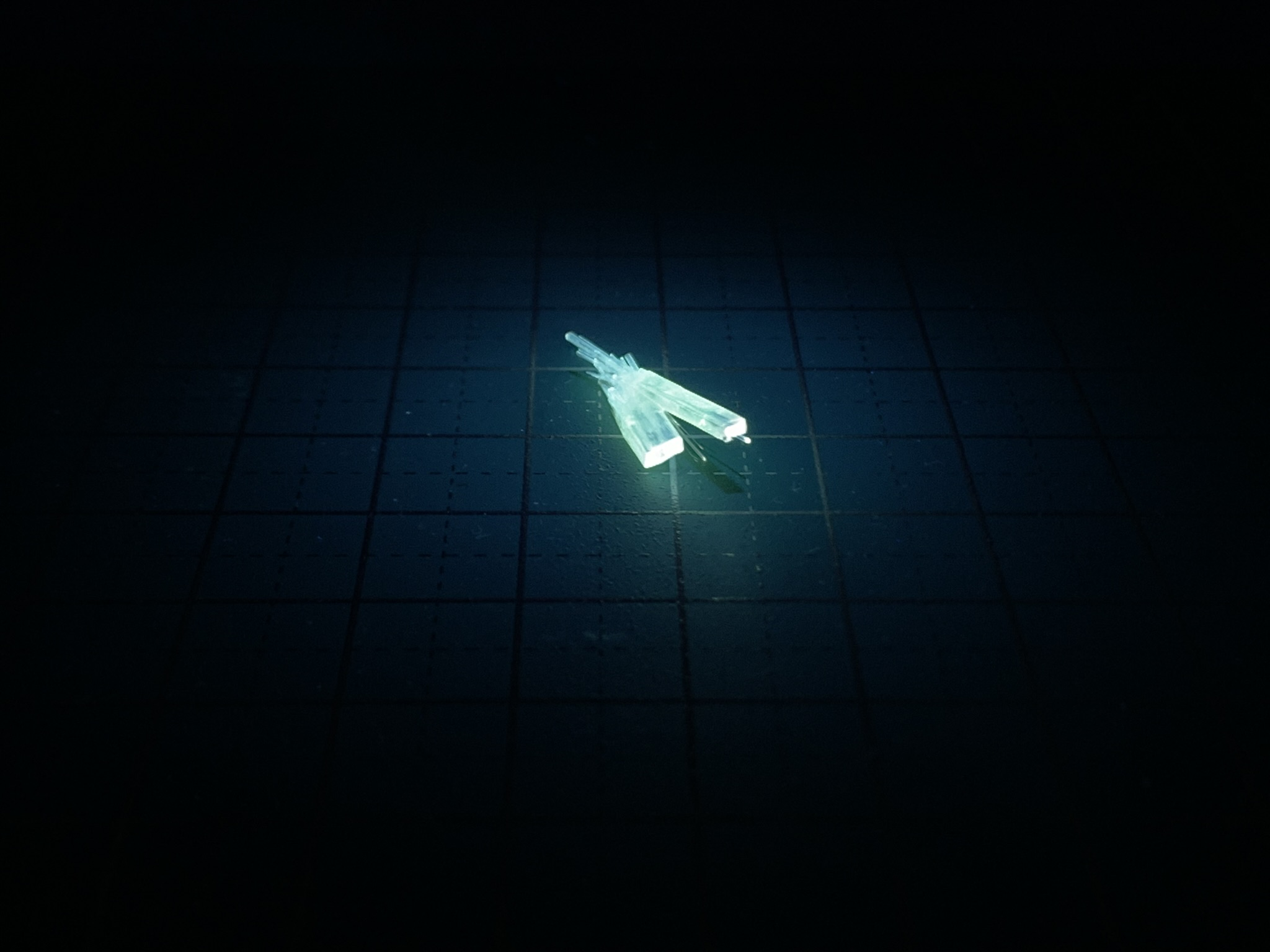
Fluorescence of (9H-carbazol-9-yl)(2,4-dichlorophenyl) methanone

Diphenylamine derivatives, being electron rich, are naturally oxidized to carbazoles when heated in air; a similar reaction is the Mallory reaction.

Substituted carbazoles are most easily synthesized with transition metal coupling reactions. For applications that transition-metal impurities in the final product might inhibit, an alternative is nucleophilic aromatic substitution on dibenzothiophene dioxide.

== Natural Occurrence ==
Carbazoles occur naturally in carbazole alkaloids. Carbazole alkaloids with unsubstituted benzene rings occur rarely. Olivacin has been found in the bark of Aspidosperma olivaceum and ellipticin in Ochrosia elliptica. Some carbazole alkaloids, especially glybomin B, have been isolated from Glycosmis pentaphylla.

Glycozoline

Olivacine

Ellipticin

Glybomine B

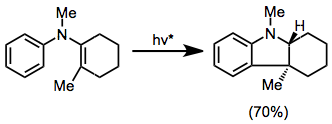

== Applications ==
As carbazoles have a relatively rich UV-visible light spectrum, they see application as pigments and photocatalysts. The parent carbazole is used in Hydron Blue production and aminoethylcarbazole is used in pigment violet 23 production.

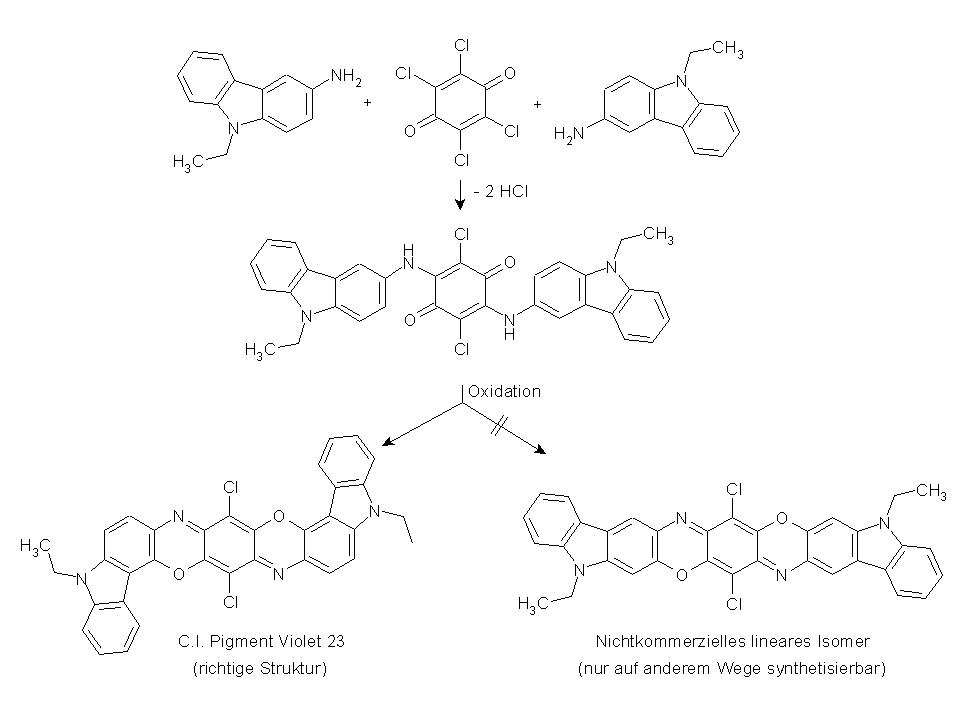
Pigment Violet 23 synthesis

Carbazoles stabilize triplet emitters in certain light-emitting diodes; in general, they are electron photodonors (hole acceptors).

Carbazole electrochemically oxidizes to a conductive polymer, which has not achieved substantial industrial use. Polyvinylcarbazole is useful in the electrical and electronic industries, and certain carbazole novolaks are extremely heat resistant.

In organic chemistry, carbazole proper is also an ingredient for several bioactive molecules. The insecticide Nirosan, the cocaine overdose antidote Rimcazole, and the veterinary NSAID Carprofen are all made from carbazole. The topoisomerase II inhibitor ellipticine fuses carbazole to a pyridine ring.

== See also ==
- Indole
- Carboline
- Fluorene
- Polychlorinated carbazoles
- Carbazole alkaloids
