= Girinimbine =

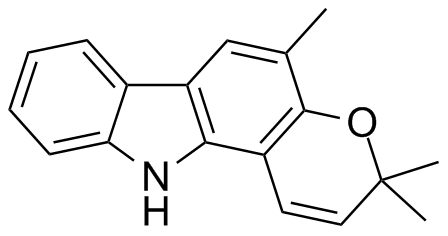

Names
- Preferred IUPAC name 3,3,5-Trimethyl-3,11-dihydropyrano[3,2-a]carbazole
- Other names Girinimbin

Identifiers
CAS Number	23095-44-5
3D model (JSmol)	Interactive image
ChEBI	CHEBI:69926
ChemSpider	87534
PubChem CID	96943
UNII	WH639V7QSF
CompTox Dashboard (EPA)	DTXSID90945774
- InChI: InChI=1S/C18H17NO/c1-11-10-14-12-6-4-5-7-15(12)19-16(14)13-8-9-18(2,3)20-17(11)13/h4-10,19H,1-3H3 Key: GAEQWKVGMHUUKO-UHFFFAOYSA-N; InChI=1/C18H17NO/c1-11-10-14-12-6-4-5-7-15(12)19-16(14)13-8-9-18(2,3)20-17(11)13/h4-10,19H,1-3H3 Key: GAEQWKVGMHUUKO-UHFFFAOYAD
- SMILES: CC1=C2C(=C3C(=C1)C4=CC=CC=C4N3)C=CC(O2)(C)C

Properties
Chemical formula	C_{18}H_{17}NO
Molar mass	263.340 g·mol^{−1}
- Except where otherwise noted, data are given for materials in their standard state (at 25 °C [77 °F], 100 kPa). Infobox references

Girinimbine is a carbazole alkaloid isolated from the curry tree (Murraya koenigii) along with the related alkaloids mahanimbine, koenimbine, isomahanine, mahanine, and others.

A 2011 study of girinimbine found that it inhibited the growth and induced apoptosis in human hepatocellular carcinoma, Hep G2 cells in vitro.
