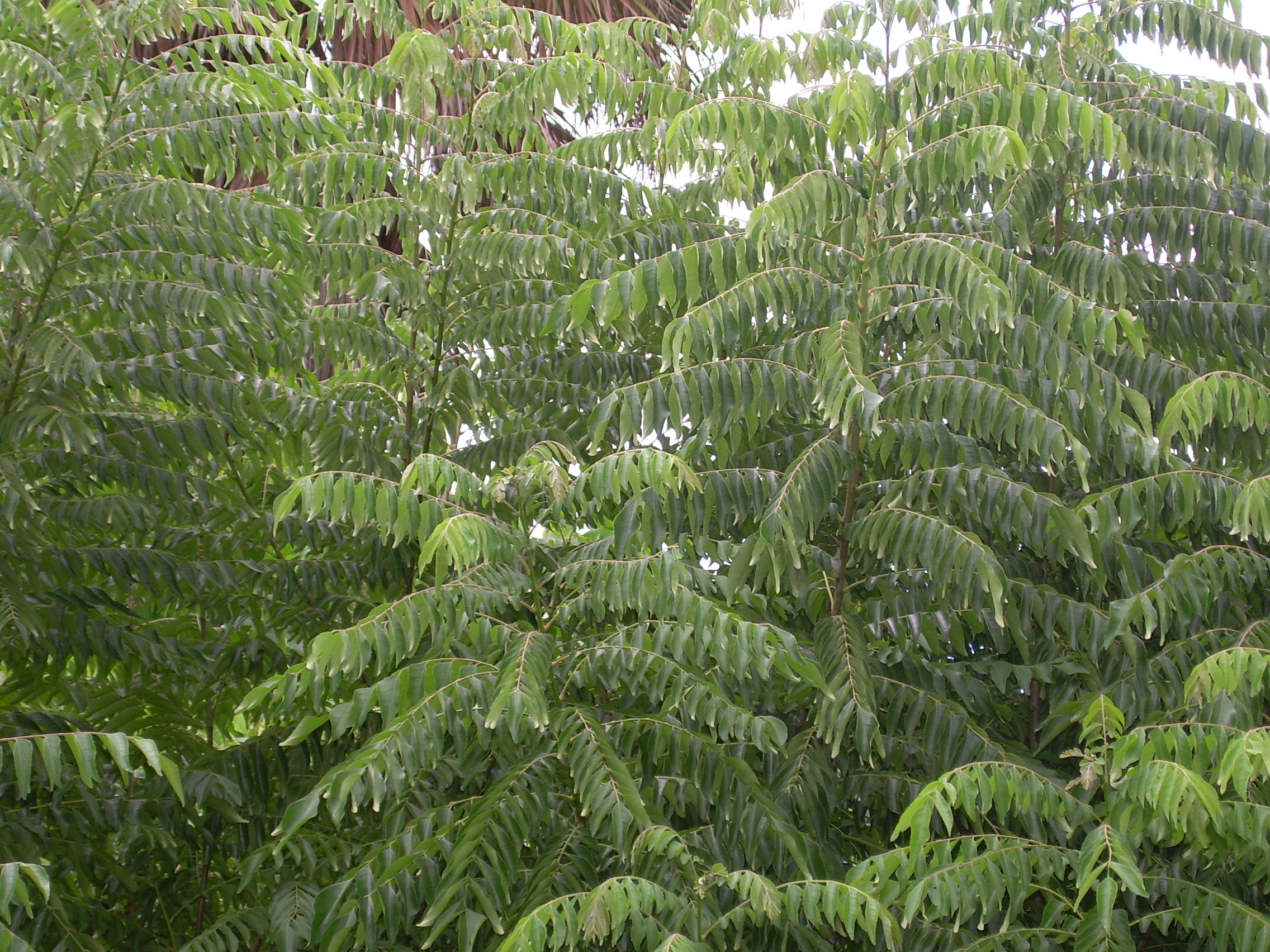

Conservation status
- Least Concern (IUCN 3.1)

Scientific classification
- Kingdom: Plantae
- Clade: Tracheophytes
- Clade: Angiosperms
- Clade: Eudicots
- Clade: Rosids
- Order: Sapindales
- Family: Rutaceae
- Genus: Bergera
- Species: B. koenigii

Binomial name
- Bergera koenigii L.

Synonyms
- Camunium koenigii (L.) Kuntze; Chalcas koenigii (L.) Kurz; Murraya koenigii (L.) Spreng.; Bergera siamensis (Craib) F.J.Mou; Chalcas siamensis (Craib) Tanaka; Murraya foetidissima Teijsm. & Binn.; Murraya siamensis Craib; Nimbo melioides Dennst.

= Curry tree =

Species of flowering plant

Bergera koenigii, synonym Murraya koenigii, and commonly known in English as curry tree, curry bush or sweet neem, is a tree in the citrus family Rutaceae, cultivated and used for millennia in South Asian cuisine. It was first described taxonomically by Carl Linnaeus in 1767. It is native to the Indian subcontinent, southern China and mainland Southeast Asia, and it has been introduced to other parts of Southeast Asia and to Australia. Its leaves are used in many culinary dishes in India, Sri Lanka and Bangladesh.

== Description ==
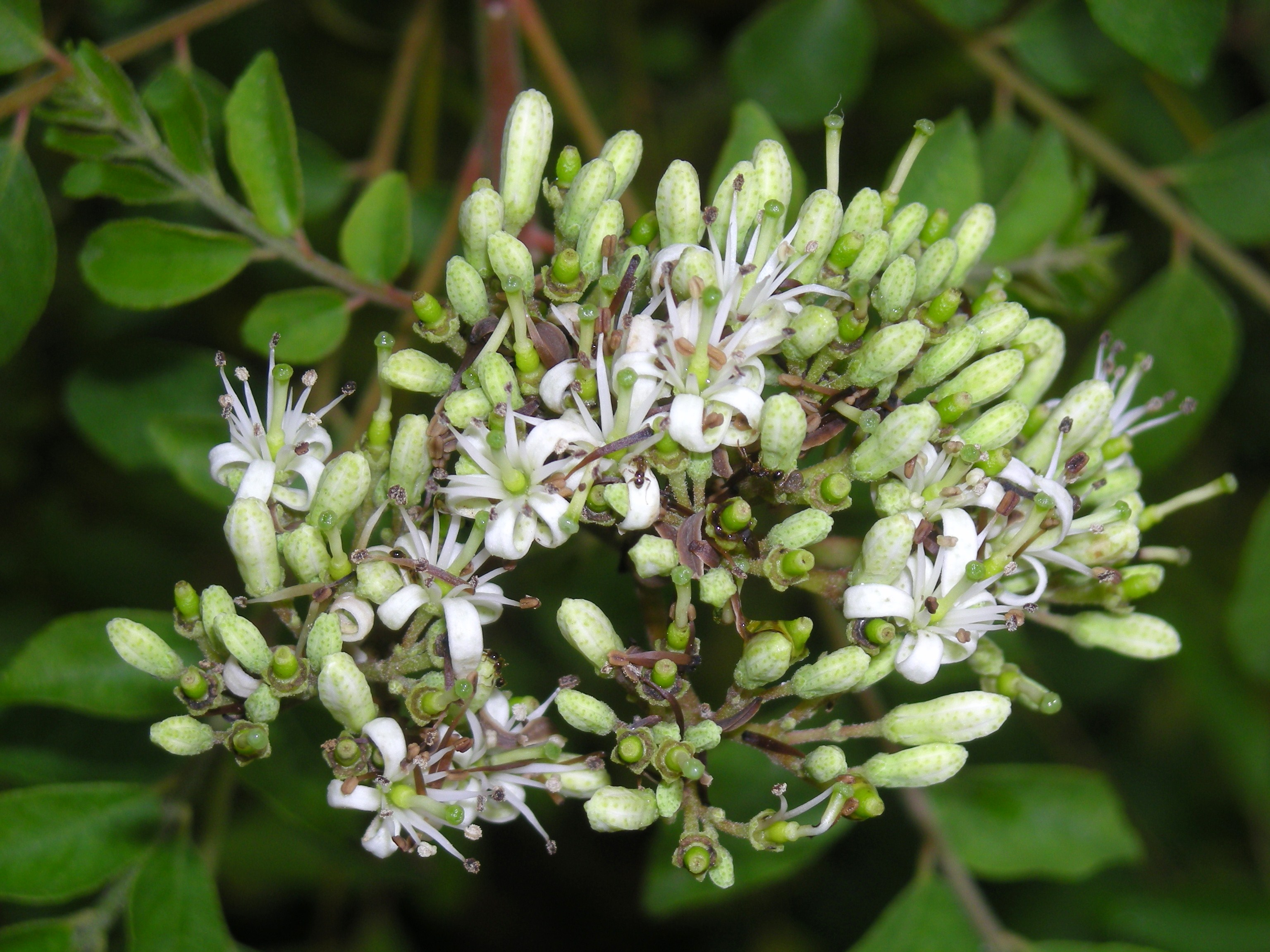
The small flowers are white and fragrant.

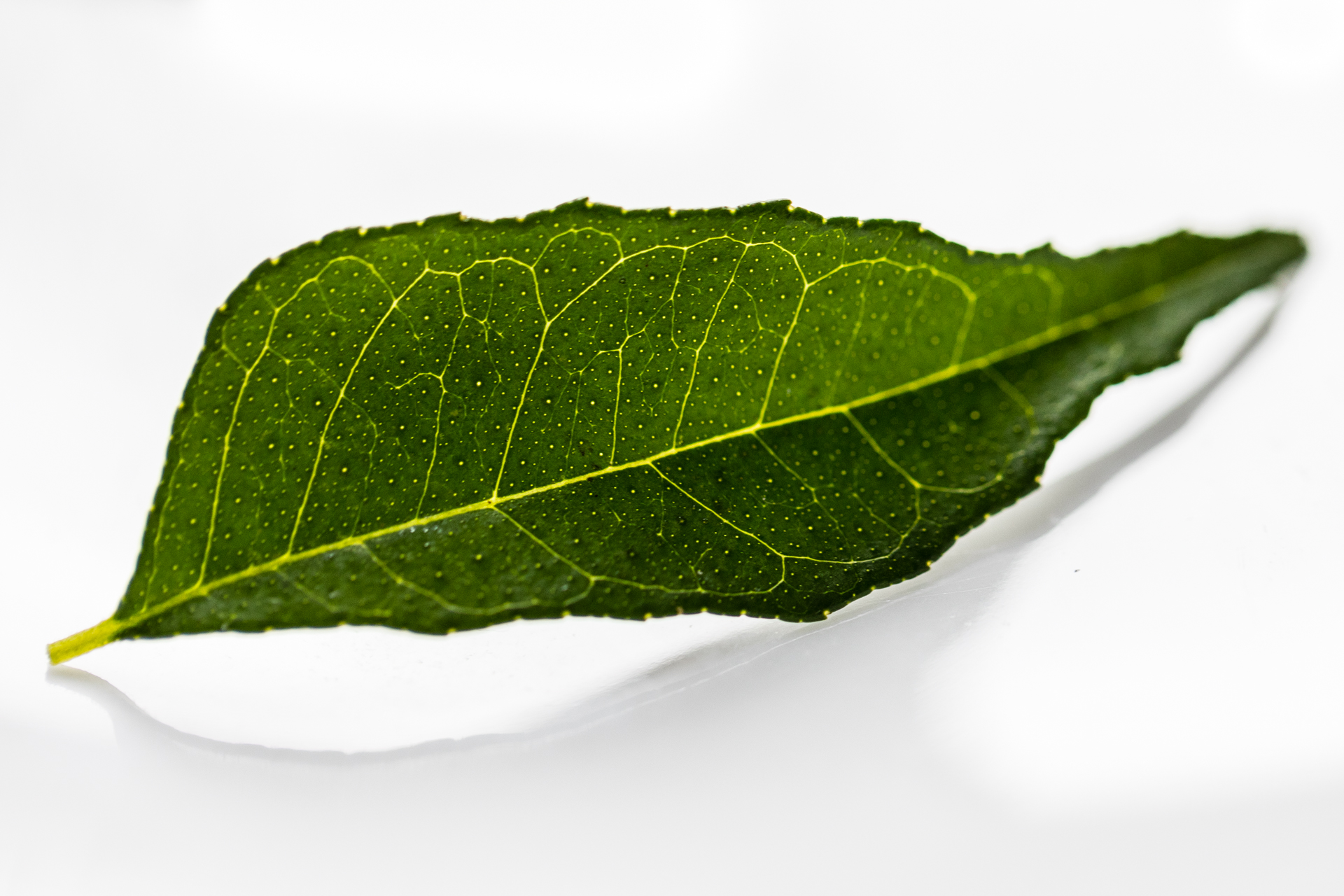
A leaflet (a 'curry leaf') close up

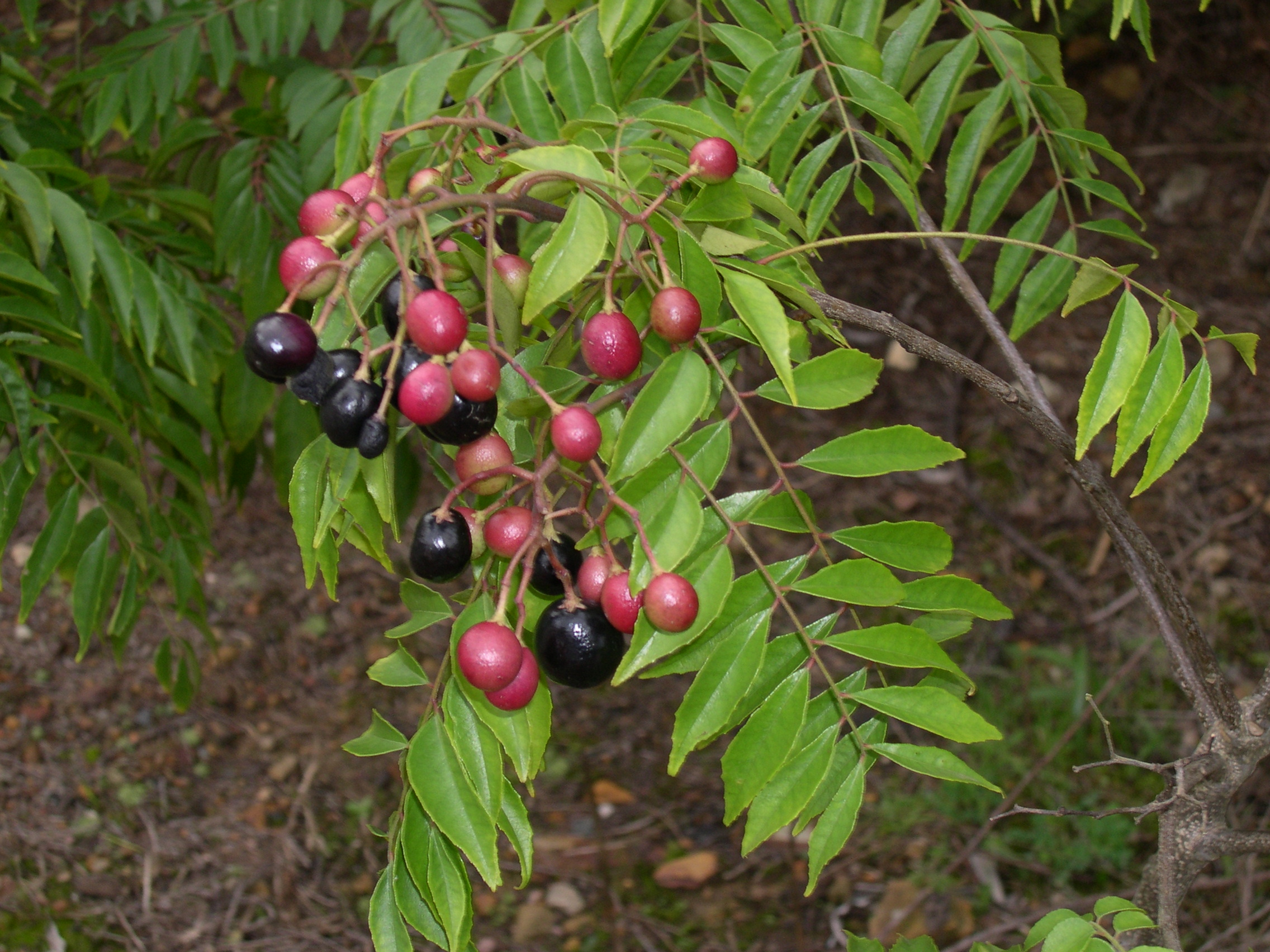
Ripe and unripe fruits

It is a small to medium-sized tropical tree, typically growing 4–6 metres (13–20 ft) tall but capable of reaching up to 8–10 metres (26–33 ft) under favourable conditions, with a trunk up to 40 cm (16 in) in diameter. The aromatic leaves are pinnate, with 11–21 leaflets, each leaflet 2–4 cm (3/4–1 1/2 in) long and 1–2 cm (1/2–3/4 in) broad. The plant produces small white flowers which can self-pollinate to produce small shiny-black drupes containing a single, large viable seed. The berry pulp is edible, with a sweet flavor.

== Distribution and habitat ==
The tree is native to the following areas as defined in the World Geographical Scheme for Recording Plant Distributions:

- Indian subcontinent: Assam, Bangladesh, East Himalaya, India, Nepal, Pakistan, Sri Lanka and West Himalaya
- China: China South-Central, China Southeast, Hainan
- Indo-China: Cambodia, Laos, Thailand, Vietnam
- Malesia: Malaya

It has been introduced to Bahrain, Qatar, United Arab Emirates, the Andaman Islands, Christmas Island, Fiji, Java, the Laccadive Islands, the Maldives, the Nicobar Islands and Sumatra. It has also been introduced to Queensland, Australia, where it is classed as an environmental weed.

Commercial plantations have been established in India, Australia and Costa del Sol in Spain.

== Cultivation ==
It grows best in well-drained soil that does not dry out, in areas with full sun or partial shade, preferably away from the wind. Growth is more robust when temperatures are at least 18 °C (64 °F).

== Etymology and common names ==
The word 'curry' is borrowed from the Tamil word kari ('spiced sauce' or 'meat'). The name of the plant in Tamil is also sometimes associated with the perceived blackness of the tree's leaves ('karuveppilai', meaning dark leaves), though the English word curry stems from its use in spiced dishes. The records of the leaves being utilized are found in Tamil literature dating back to the 1st and 4th centuries CE. Britain had spice trades with the ancient Tamil region. It was introduced to England in the late 16th century.

The species Bergera koenigii was first published by Carl Linnaeus in Mantissa Plantarum vol.2 on page 563 in 1767. It was formerly known as Murraya koenigii (L.) Spreng., which was first published in Syst. Veg., ed. 16. 2: 315 in 1825. Some sources still recognise it as the accepted name.

The former generic name, Murraya, derives from Johan Andreas Murray (1740–1791), who studied botany under Carl Linnaeus and became a professor of medicine with an interest in medicinal plants at the University of Göttingen, Germany. The specific name, koenigii, derives from the last name of botanist Johann Gerhard König.

The curry tree is also called curry leaf tree or curry bush, among numerous local names, depending on the country.

== Uses ==
=== Culinary ===
Curry leaves have a "mild, aromatic, slightly bitter" flavor.

The fresh leaves are an indispensable part of Indian cuisine and Indian traditional medicines. They are most widely used in southern and west coast Indian cooking, usually fried along with vegetable oil, mustard seeds and chopped onions in the first stage of the preparation. They are also used to make thoran, vada, rasam, and kadhi; additionally, they are often dry-roasted (and then ground) in the preparation of various powdered spice blends (masalas), such as South Indian sambar masala, the main seasoning in the ubiquitous vegetable stew sambar. The curry leaves are also added as flavoring to masala dosa, the South Indian potato-filled dosas, made with a mildly probiotic, fermented lentil and rice batter. The fresh leaves are valued as seasoning in the cuisines of South and Southeast Asia. In Cambodia, curry leaves (Khmer: ស្លឹកកន្ទ្រោប, slœ̆k kontroap) are roasted and used as an ingredient for samlor machu kroeung. In Java, the leaves are often stewed to flavor gulai. Though available dried, the aroma and flavor are greatly inferior. In almost all cases, the leaves will be freshly plucked from a garden only a few hours or even minutes before they are used. The oil can be extracted and used to make scented soaps.

The leaves of Murraya koenigii are also used as a herb in Ayurvedic and Siddha medicine in which they are believed to possess anti-disease properties, but there is no high-quality clinical evidence for such effects.

The berries are edible, but the seeds may be toxic to humans.

== Propagation ==
Seeds must be ripe and fresh to plant; dried or shriveled fruits are not viable. The skin must be peeled off, and this is recommended before planting. One can plant the whole fruit, but it is best to remove the pulp before planting in a potting mix that is kept moist but not wet. Stem cuttings can be also used for propagation. In the Indian subcontinent, the plant is a fixture in almost every household. It is mainly planted privately, but also cultivated commercially to a small extent. Because the leaves must be fresh upon use, it is often traded through a small neighborhood or city wide network of farmers, who regularly supply fresh leaves to stall vendors.

== Chemical constituents ==
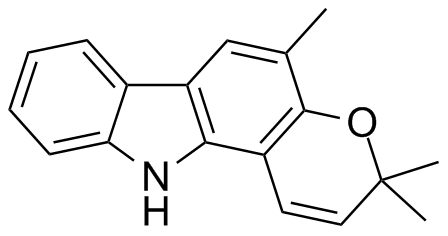
Chemical structure of girinimbine.

Compounds found in curry tree leaves, stems, bark, and seeds include cinnamaldehyde, and numerous carbazole alkaloids, including mahanimbine, girinimbine, and mahanine. Major odor compounds contained in the leaves are the sulfury-smelling 1-phenylethanethiol, the citrusy-smelling linalool, the resinous-smelling α-pinene, eucalyptol, the grassy-smelling cis-3-hexenal, methional, myrcene, cis-3-hexen-1-ol and trans,cis-2,6-nonadienal.

Nutritionally, the leaves are a rich source of carotenoids, beta-carotene, calcium and iron.
