= Polyvinylcarbazole =

Names
- Other names Poly(vinylcarbazole); Poly(N-vinylcarbazole); Poly(9-vinylcarbazole)

Identifiers
CAS Number	25067-59-8
CompTox Dashboard (EPA)	DTXSID701009743

Properties
Chemical formula	(C_{14}H_{11}N)_{n}
Melting point	> 320 °C
- Except where otherwise noted, data are given for materials in their standard state (at 25 °C [77 °F], 100 kPa). Infobox references

Polyvinylcarbazole (PVK) is a temperature-resistant thermoplastic polymer produced by radical polymerization from the monomer N-vinylcarbazole. It is a photoconductive polymer and thus the basis for photorefractive polymers and organic light-emitting diodes.

== History ==
Polyvinylcarbazole was discovered by the chemists Walter Reppe (1892-1969), Ernst Keyssner and Eugen Dorrer and patented by I.G. Farben in the USA in 1937. PVK was the first polymer whose photoconductivity was known. Starting in the 1960s, further polymers of this kind were sought.

== Production ==
Polyvinylcarbazole is obtained from N-vinylcarbazole by radical polymerization in various ways. It can be produced by suspension polymerization at 180 °C with sodium chloride and potassium chromate as catalyst. Alternatively, AIBN can also be used as a radical starter or a Ziegler-Natta catalyst.

== Properties ==
=== Physical properties ===
PVK can be used at temperatures of up to 160 - 170 °C and is therefore a temperature-resistant thermoplastic. The electrical conductivity changes depending on the illumination. For this reason, PVK is classified as a semiconductor or photoconductor. The polymer is extremely brittle, but the brittleness can be reduced by copolymerization with a little isoprene.

=== Chemical properties ===
Polyvinylcarbazole is soluble in aromatic hydrocarbons, halogenated hydrocarbons and ketones. It is resistant to acids, alkalis, polar solvents and aliphatic hydrocarbons. The addition of PVK to other plastic masses increases their temperature resistance.

== Use ==
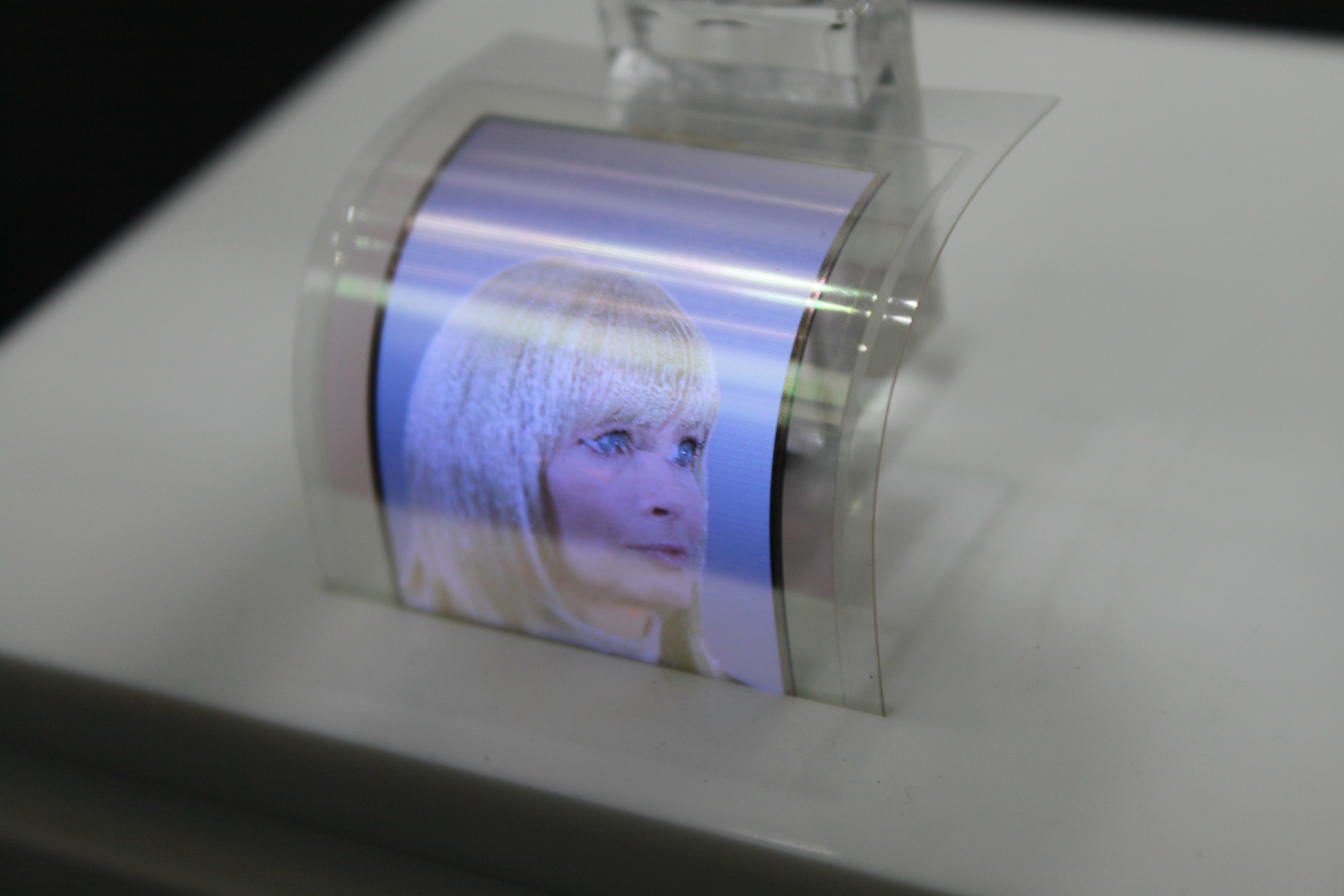
Display based on organic light emitting diodes

Due to its high price and special properties, the use of PVK is limited to special areas. It is used in insulation technology, electrophotography (e.g. in copiers and laser printers), for the fabrication of polymer photonic crystals, for organic light-emitting diodes and photovoltaic devices. In addition, PVK is a well researched component in photorefractive polymers and therefore plays an important role in holography. Another application is the production of cooking-proof copolymers with styrene.

== See also ==
- Organic photorefractive materials
