= PVK =

PVK may refer to:

- Papuan Volunteer Corps (Papoea Vrijwilligers Korps)
- Pirates, Vikings and Knights
- Aktion National Airport (IATA Code PVK)
- PVK Jadran
- PVK Olymp Praha
- Poly-(N-vinyl carbazole)
- VK Budva (formerly PVK Budvanska Rivijera)
