= N-Vinylcarbazole =

N-vinylcarbazole
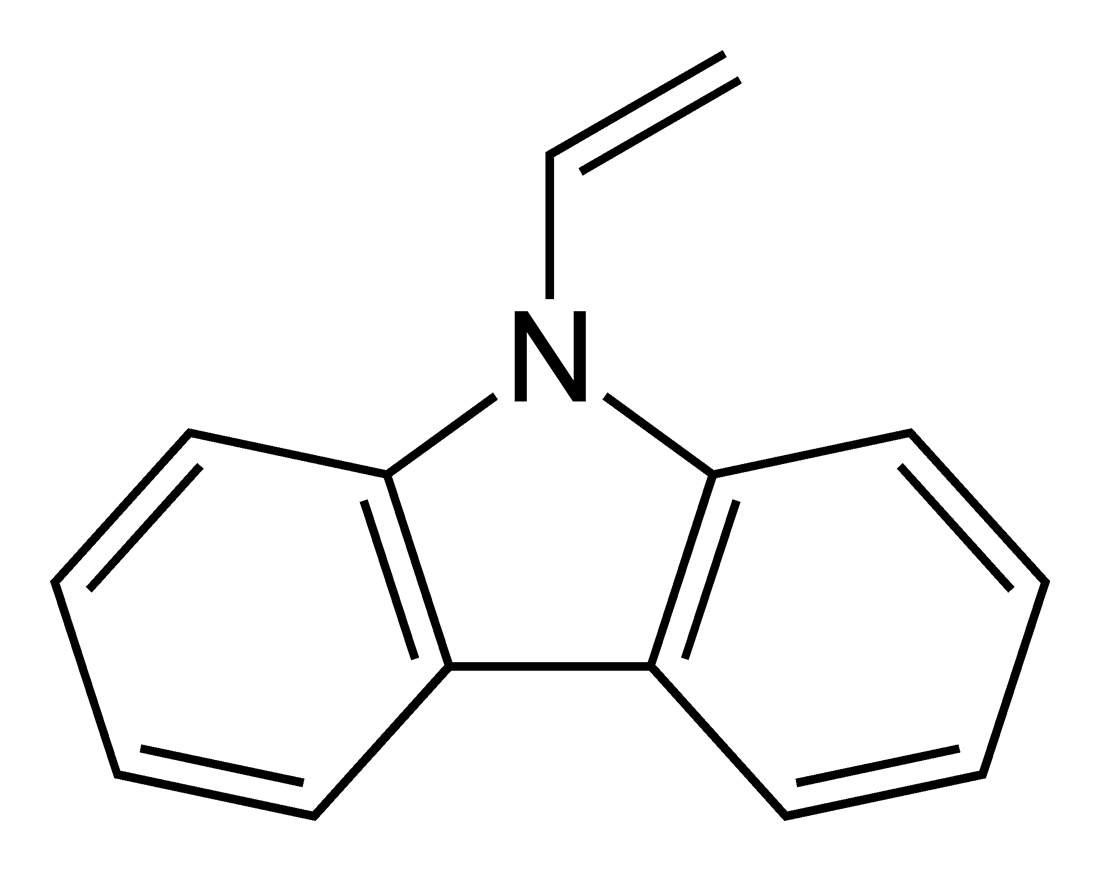

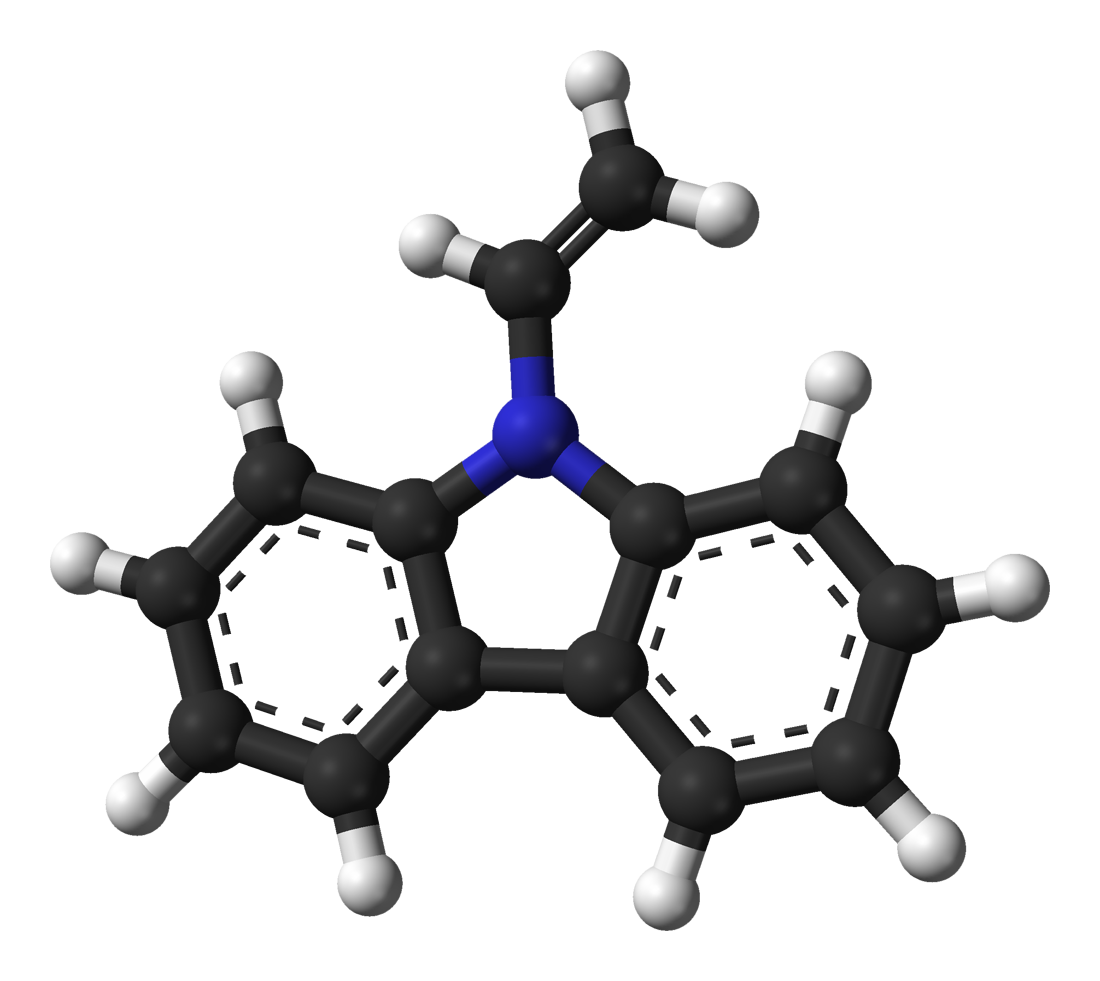

Names
- Preferred IUPAC name 9-Ethenyl-9H-carbazole
- Other names 9-Vinyl-9H-carbazole, NVC

Identifiers
CAS Number	1484-13-5
3D model (JSmol)	Interactive image
ChemSpider	14414
ECHA InfoCard	100.014.596
EC Number	216-055-0
PubChem CID	15143
RTECS number	FE6350000
UNII	D629AMY6F9
CompTox Dashboard (EPA)	DTXSID4022155
- InChI: InChI=1S/C14H11N/c1-2-15-13-9-5-3-7-11(13)12-8-4-6-10-14(12)15/h2-10H,1H2 Key: KKFHAJHLJHVUDM-UHFFFAOYSA-N
- SMILES: c1cccc3c1c2c(cccc2)n3C=C

Properties
Chemical formula	C_{14}H_{11}N
Molar mass	193.244 g⋅mol^{−1}
Appearance	Pale brown crystalline solid
Melting point	66 °C (151 °F; 339 K)
Boiling point	154 to 155 °C (309 to 311 °F; 427 to 428 K) 3 mmHg
Solubility in water	Insoluble
Solubility in diethyl ether	Very soluble
- Except where otherwise noted, data are given for materials in their standard state (at 25 °C [77 °F], 100 kPa). verify (what is ?) Infobox references

N-Vinylcarbazole is an organic compound used as a monomer in the production of poly(vinylcarbazole), a conductive polymer, in which conductivity is photon-dependent. The benzine compound is used in the photoreceptors of photocopiers. Upon exposure to γ-irradiation, N-vinylcarbazole undergoes solid-state polymerisation.

It is produced by the vinylation of carbazole with acetylene in the presence of base.

== Related compounds ==
- Carbazole
