= Photoconductive polymer =

Photoconductive polymers absorb electromagnetic radiation and produce an increase of electrical conductivity. Photoconductive polymers have been used in a wide variety of technical applications such as Xerography (electrophotography) and laser printing. Electrical conductivity is usually very small in organic compounds. Conductive polymers usually have large electrical conductivity. Photoconductive polymer is a smart material based on conductive polymer, and the electrical conductivity can be controlled by the amount of radiation.

The basic parameters of photoconductivity are the quantum efficiency of carrier generation($\Upsilon$), the carrier mobility($\mu$), electric field(E), temperature(T), and concentration(C) of charge carriers. The intrinsic properties of photoconductive polymers are the quantum efficiency ($\Upsilon$) and carrier mobility($\mu$), which will determine the photocurrent. Photocurrent will be affected by these four kinds of processes: charge-carrier generation, charge injection, charge trapping, charge carrier transport.

Hundreds of photoconductive polymers have been disclosed in patents and literature. There are mainly two types of photoconductive polymer: negative photoconductive polymers and magnetic photoconductive polymers.

== Definition ==
Photoconductivity is an optical and electrical phenomenon, which material's electrical conductivity increase by absorption of electromagnetic radiation (e.g. visible light, ultraviolet light, infrared light). Photoconductive polymers can serve as good insulators when the electricity, free electrons and holes are absent.

In general, the polymers usually satisfy these two features.

1. Photoconductive polymers can absorb light to excite electrons from ground state to excited state. The photoexcited electron will form a pair of charge carriers, it can be separated by electric field.

2. Photoconductive polymers must allow migration of either photoexcited electrons or holes, or both, through the polymer in the electric field towards the appropriate electrodes.

Photoconductive polymers act merely as charge-transporting media, and it can be p-type or n-type, however most known photoconductive polymers are p-type (only transport holes). Photocurrents usually observed are very small in organic compounds. The mobilities μ are typically 10^{−12}-10^{−18} m^{2}V^{−1}s^{−1}. And photocurrents are usually effected by charge-carrier generation, injection and transport.

Photoconductive polymers have been developed into different types, there are two mainly types, one is negative photoconductivity, another one is magnetic photoconductivity. The photoconductive polymers have been greatly enriched the photoconductive material, and there are many applications (e.g. xerography, laser printers)

=== Negative ===
Some materials exhibit decrease in photoconductivity upon exposure to illumination. One prominent example is hydrogenated amorphous silicon in which a metastable reduction in photoconductivity is observable. Other materials that were reported to exhibit negative photoconductivity include molybdenum disulfide, graphene, and metal nanoparticles.

== Factors influencing the photocurrent ==
When light is absorbed by a material, the number of free electrons and electron holes increases and raises its electrical conductivity. To cause excitation, the light that strikes to the materials must have enough energy to raise electrons across the band gap, or to excite the impurities within the band gap. And this process will involve four kinds of processes: charge-carrier generation, charge injection, charge trapping, charge carrier transport.

== Charge-carrier generation ==
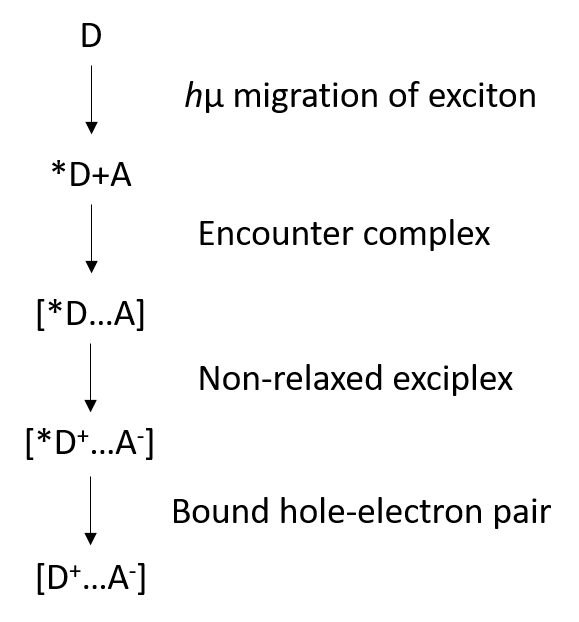
Mechanism of intrinsic photogeneration of charge in amorphous photoconductors

The charge-carrier generation can be affected in different aspects: photons absorbed, polymer itself, photoexcitation of photosensitive material. The mechanism for intrinsic photogeneration is as illustrated.

As Onsager originally developed this theory:

The encounter complex will be formed by photoexcitation with migration of the exciton to an acceptor site. The photogeneration efficiency is determined by the competition between carrier separation and geminate recombination. The photogeneration efficiency was defined by using the dissociation of ion pairs in weak electrolytes, which can be expressed as a function of electric field, temperature and the separation distance of the bound hole-electron pair. The overall photogeneration efficiency $\phi (E)$ can be given by

$\phi (E)=\phi_0\int p(r,\Theta,E)g(r,\Theta)d^3r$

$d^3r$ is a volume element, $\phi$ is the primary quantum yield, $p(r,\Theta,E)$ is the probability that a hole-electron pair separated by a distance $r$ at an angle $\Theta$ to the direction of electric field $E$, $g(r,\Theta)$ is the spatial distribution function between ions.

Efficient injection of charge into the layer plays an important role in the operation with a photogeneration layer.

Under quasi-steady state conditions, it can be written by the flowing equation:

$\frac{dn}{dt}=\phi I-\gamma_r n^2-\gamma_i n\thickapprox0$

$\phi I$ is the rate of the incident photons that are absorbed in the photogeneration, $\gamma_r n^2$ is the rate of the density of free carriers in the generation layer reduced by recombination, $\gamma_i n$ is the injection rate.

Assuming that the charges cross the interface will not return, the photoinjection efficiency $\Upsilon$ can be defined as

$\Upsilon=\frac{\gamma_i n}{I}=\delta [(1+\frac{2\phi}{\delta})^\frac{1}{2}-1)]$, when $\delta=\gamma_i^2/2I\gamma_r$

(i)For a large $\delta$ or low recombination rates, $\Upsilon=0$, in which case the photoinjection efficiency is determined by the generation efficiency.

(ii)For a small $\delta$ or high recombination rates, $\Upsilon=(2\delta\phi)^\frac{1}{2}$ and the photoinjection efficiency will depend on the injection rate, $\gamma_i$.

== Charge transport ==
Charge transport can be defined as the process that photogenerated charge in photoconductors be injected into the transport material. When charges injected, charges will migrate through the medium and then reach to the opposite electrode. In this process, electrons or holes or both, involves 'hopping', for example, a sequence of transfers of charges among localized sites. These localized sites are connected with individual functional groups or segments of the polymer chain.

Generally, hole injection, or transfer of holes into the transporting media. This process can be regarded as an oxidation step with cation radicals generate. Meanwhile, electron injection is a reduction process.

Based on the properties of charge transport, the photoconductive polymers usually satisfy one of the features:

(1)Photoconductive polymers are σ-conjugated.

(2)Photoconductive polymers have an extended π-electron system in the backbone pendant to the chain.

These features guarantee delocalization and stabilize the transport charge.

== Charge trapping ==
Charge trapping is an important processes, in which migrating charges can be immobilized in trap sites. If the traps are 'shallow', they may be referred to as 'transportinteractive'. Hole trapping materials usually have lower oxidation potentials and work as host-transporting materials. Stronger electron acceptor have better ability to trap transport electron.

Charges can be immobilized by redox-irreversible side-reactions due to the geminate recombination and recombination of carriers in the circuit. In this process, charged moiety can be illustrated by the scheme:

(a)Charge immobilization due to a redox-irreversible side-reaction

(a) The redox steps to achieve trap-free migration of a hole involving neutral groups M and charged groups M+

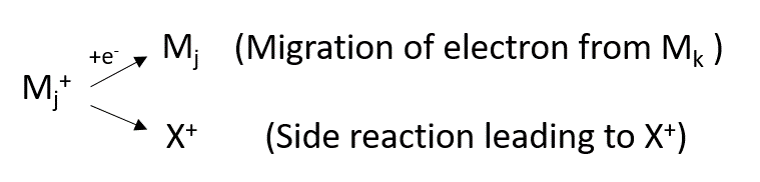
(b)Charge immobilization due to a redox-irreversible side-reaction

(b) The intermittent species M_{j}^{+} can undergo two kinds of process:

(i) The migration of electron from M_{k} will result in forming M_{j} coming from M_{j}^{+}

(ii) M_{j}^{+} undergo a side-reaction leading to a charged species X^{+} that won't further exchange the charge with the neighboring group M.

== Experimental techniques ==
=== General introduction ===
There are some parameters in photoconductive polymers: quantum efficiency of photogeneration $\phi$, the carrier mobility $\mu$ and the injection efficiency $\Upsilon$. These parameters can not be got in steady-state measurements, $\phi$ and $\mu$ are very important parameters in the expression of photoconductivity, they are obtained from independent experiments.

Transient techniques, time-of-flight (TOF) and xerographic discharge are conventional transient techniques which are used to determine the parameters of photoconductive polymers. And they all need to be done under non-injecting contacts.

=== Experimental determination of charge carrier mobility ===
The charges will be generated in the region, which closed to the electrode the incident photos are absorbed. In order to avoid the migrating charges as a current pulse, RC have a smaller value than ${t_{Tr}}$(RC<${t_{Tr}}$, R: resistance, C: capacitance and ${t_{Tr}}$: transit time of the charges). The signal is a rectangle with an amplitude $i_0$ without excessive charge dispersion and can be expressed as below:

$i_0=\frac{e\phi N}{t_{Tr}}$, where $e$ is the electronic charge and N is the number of absorbed photos

And the current will close to 0 when the charges reach to the electrode, so the carrier mobility can be expressed as below:

$\mu=\frac{L}{E t_{Tr}}$, where $L$ is the thickness of the film.

In the xerographic technique, the corona-deposited charge plays the same role as the semitransparent electrode. The potential difference is monitored by a coupled probe. In the absence of charge trapping, the rate of potential decay has the form:

$\frac{dV}{dt}\boldsymbol{}\in\frac{I'\phi}{C}$, where $C$ is capacitance and $I'$ is the number of absorbed photons per unit area per unit time.

By measuring the decay rate of the potential, $\mu$ and $\phi$ can be obtained, respectively.

== Applications ==
The photoconductive polymer have been successfully applied in Xerography and laser printers. They used the layered organic photoconductive polymer with a polymeric charge-transport layer. The charge-transport layer is a solid solution compared with other printer that usually use liquid chemicals in printing process. The main advantages of organic photoconductive polymer are (i) near-IR sensitivity (ii) panchromaticity (iii)flexibility for application (iv) simple fabrication (v) low cost. Currently, the best organic photoconductive polymer are as sensitive as the inorganic devices based on selenium.

There is some potential application in photovoltaic cells. The limit of this application is that photoconductive polymer don't have high conversion efficiency.

Some possible applications are just reported by the literature but no commercial products. They are photothermoplastic imaging, holographic recording and optical switching devices.

=== Xerography ===
Xerography or electrophotography is a photocopying technique. Its fundamental principle was invented by Chester Carlson in 1938 and developed and commercialized by the Xerox Corporation, which is used for high-quality printing. To begin with, the technique was called electrophotography, then it was renamed to xerography. In traditional reproduction techniques, liquid chemicals are involved in printing process. Xerography use photoconductive polymer as the foundation material, which is solid chemicals.

Carlson's innovation combined electrostatic printing with photography, unlike the electrostatic printing process invented by Georg Christoph Lichtenberg in 1778. Carlson's original process requires several manual processing steps with flat plates. It was almost 18 years before a fully automated process was developed, the key breakthrough being use of a cylindrical drum coated with selenium instead of a flat plate. This resulted in the first commercial automatic copier(Xerox 914) in 1960.

Before 1960, Carlson had proposed his idea to more than a dozen companies, but none was interested. Xerography is now used in most photocopying machines, laser and LED printers.

=== Laser printers ===
Laser printing is an electrostatic digital printing process. It produces high-quality text and graphics by repeatedly passing a laser beam back and forth over a negatively charged cylinder called a "drum" to get a charged image. The drum can selectively collect electrically charged powdered ink (toner), and transfers the image to paper.

As digital photocopiers, laser printers employ a xerographic printing process. However, laser printing differs from analog photocopiers. Because the image is produced by direct scanning of the medium across the printer's photoreceptor, which enables laser printing to copy images more quickly than most photocopiers.

The first laser printer was invented by Xerox PARC in the 1970s. Laser printers were introduced for the office and then home markets in subsequent years by IBM, Canon, Xerox, Apple, Hewlett-Packard and others. Over the decades, quality and speed have increased as the price fall, and the once cutting-edge printing devices are now ubiquitous.

== See also ==
- Photodiode
- Photoresistor
- Infrared detector
- Lead selenide PbSe
- Indium antimonide (InSb)
