= Holographic Data Storage System =

Holographic Data Storage System (HDSS) program was a US Federal government-funded consortium on holographic data storage by Teledyne Technologies, IBM and Stanford University, created in 1995. Work on the program began in 1994 and it was funded by DARPA.

== History ==
Proposed in the 1960s, holographic storage records data by capturing the interference patterns between a modulated optical field and a reference field within a storage medium. The data is retrieved by diffracting the reference field off the hologram, reconstructing the original optical field containing the data. The holographic data storage system was created with the initial goals of developing several key components for the system, including a high-capacity, high-bandwidth spatial light modulator used for data input, optimized sensor arrays for data output, and a high-power red semiconductor laser. At the same time, the HDSS researchers were to explore issues relating to the optical systems architecture (such as multiplexing schemes and access modes), data encoding and decoding methods, signal processing techniques, and the requirements of target applications. Into the program's final year, progress has been such that consortium member, IBM Research Division, believed that holograms could hold the key to high-capacity data storage in the next millennium.

== Mechanism ==
Large amounts of data can be stored holographically because lasers are able to store pages of electronic patterns. Holographic storage is sometimes referred to as 3D storage within special optical materials as opposed to just on the surface. In traditional holography, each viewing angle gives a different aspect of the same object. With holographic storage, however, a different 'page' of information is accessed.

Holographic storage uses two laser beams, a reference and a data beam, to create an interference pattern at a medium where the two beams intersect. This intersection causes a stable physical or chemical change which is stored in the medium.

During the reading sequence, the action of the reference beam and the stored interference pattern in the medium recreates this data beam which may be sensed by a detector array. The medium may be a rotating disk containing a polymeric material, or an optically sensitive single crystal. The key to making the holographic data storage system work is the second laser beam which is fired at the crystal to retrieve a page of data. It must exactly match the original reference beam angle. A difference of a thousandth of a millimeter will fail to retrieve the data. Holography is expected to be of value in archival or library storage applications where large quantities of data need to be retained at the lowest costs possible.

== Apparent benefits ==
Since it involves no moving parts, holographic data storage has the potential for higher reliability compared to traditional hard disk technologies. Research conducted by IBM has demonstrated the potential for storing up to 1 TB of data within a crystal approximately the size of a sugar cube, with data transfer rates reaching one trillion bits per second. A significant hurdle remains in the development of a rewritable form of holographic storage.

At the Consumer Electronics Show (CES) in 2006, a prototype holographic drive was demonstrated, which achieved a storage capacity of 300 GB, in contrast to the 100 GB capacity of Blu-ray discs at the time. It has been suggested that holographic disks could serve as a successor to Blu-ray.
