= Ellipticine =

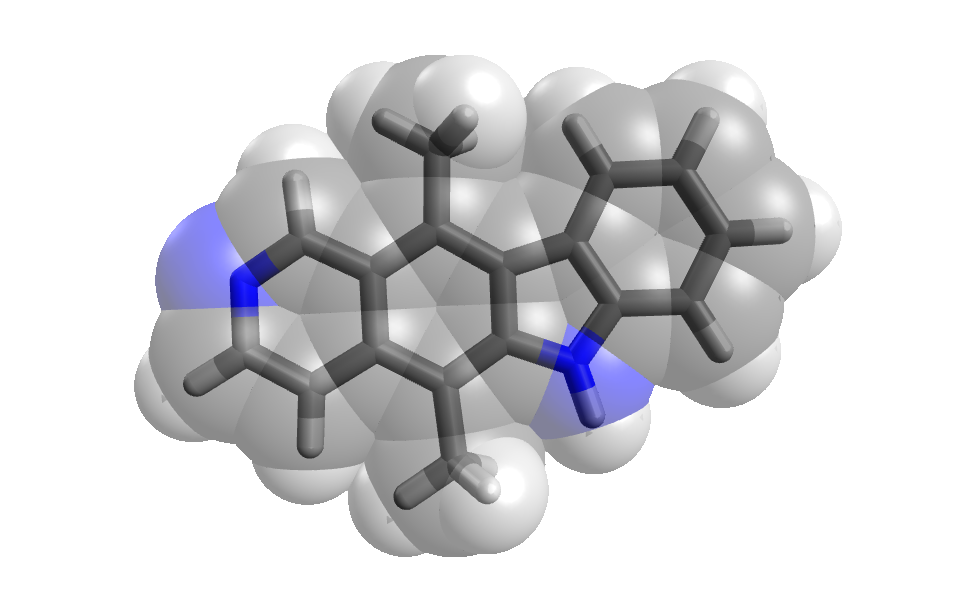

Names
- Preferred IUPAC name 5,11-Dimethyl-6H-pyrido[4,3-b]carbazole

Identifiers
| CAS Number | 519-23-3 |
| 3D model (JSmol) | Interactive image |
| ChEBI | CHEBI:4776 |
| ChemSpider | 3100 |
| ECHA InfoCard | 100.007.514 |
| EC Number | 208-264-0 |
| KEGG | C09154 |
| PubChem CID | 3213 |
| UNII | 117VLW7484 |
| CompTox Dashboard (EPA) | DTXSID30199855 |
- InChI: InChI=1S/C17H14N2/c1-10-14-9-18-8-7-12(14)11(2)17-16(10)13-5-3-4-6-15(13)19-17/h3-9,19H,1-2H3
- SMILES: CC1=C2C(=C(C3=C1C=CN=C3)C)C4=CC=CC=C4N2

Properties
| Chemical formula | C_{17}H_{14}N_{2} |
| Molar mass | 246.313 g·mol^{−1} |
| Appearance | Yellow crystalline powder |
| Density | 1.257±0.06 g/cm^{3} |
| Melting point | 316–318 °C (601–604 °F; 589–591 K) |
| Solubility in water | Very low |

Hazards
- Occupational safety and health (OHS/OSH)
| Main hazards | toxic |
- GHS labelling
| Pictograms | (GHS06: Toxic) |
| Hazard statements | H301 |
| Precautionary statements | P264, P270, P301+P310, P321, P330, P405, P501 |
- Except where otherwise noted, data are given for materials in their standard state (at 25 °C [77 °F], 100 kPa). Infobox references

Ellipticine is a tetracyclic alkaloid first extracted from the tree species Ochrosia elliptica and Rauvolfia sandwicensis which inhibits the enzyme topoisomerase II via intercalative binding to DNA.

== Natural occurrence and synthesis ==
Ellipticine is an organic compound present in several trees within the genera Ochrosia, Rauvolfia, and Aspidosperma. It was first isolated from Ochrosia elliptica Labill., a flowering tree native to Australia and New Caledonia which gives the alkaloid its name, in 1959, and synthesised by Robert Burns Woodward later the same year.

Woodward's synthesis of ellipticine.

== Biological activity ==
Ellipticine is a known intercalator, capable of entering a DNA strand between base pairs. In its intercalated state, ellipticine binds strongly and lies parallel to the base pairs, increasing the superhelical density of the DNA. Intercalated ellipticine binds directly to topoisomerase II, an enzyme involved in DNA replication, inhibiting the enzyme and resulting in powerful antitumour activity. In clinical trials, ellipticine derivatives have been observed to induce remission of tumour growth, but are not used for medical purposes due to their high toxicity; side effects include nausea and vomiting, hypertension, cramp, pronounced fatigue, mouth dryness, and mycosis of the tongue and oesophagus.

Further DNA damage results from the formation of covalent DNA adducts following enzymatic activation of ellipticine by with cytochromes P450 and peroxidases, meaning that ellipticine is classified as a prodrug.
