= Carbazole alkaloids =

Carbazole, parent compound of the carbazole alkaloids

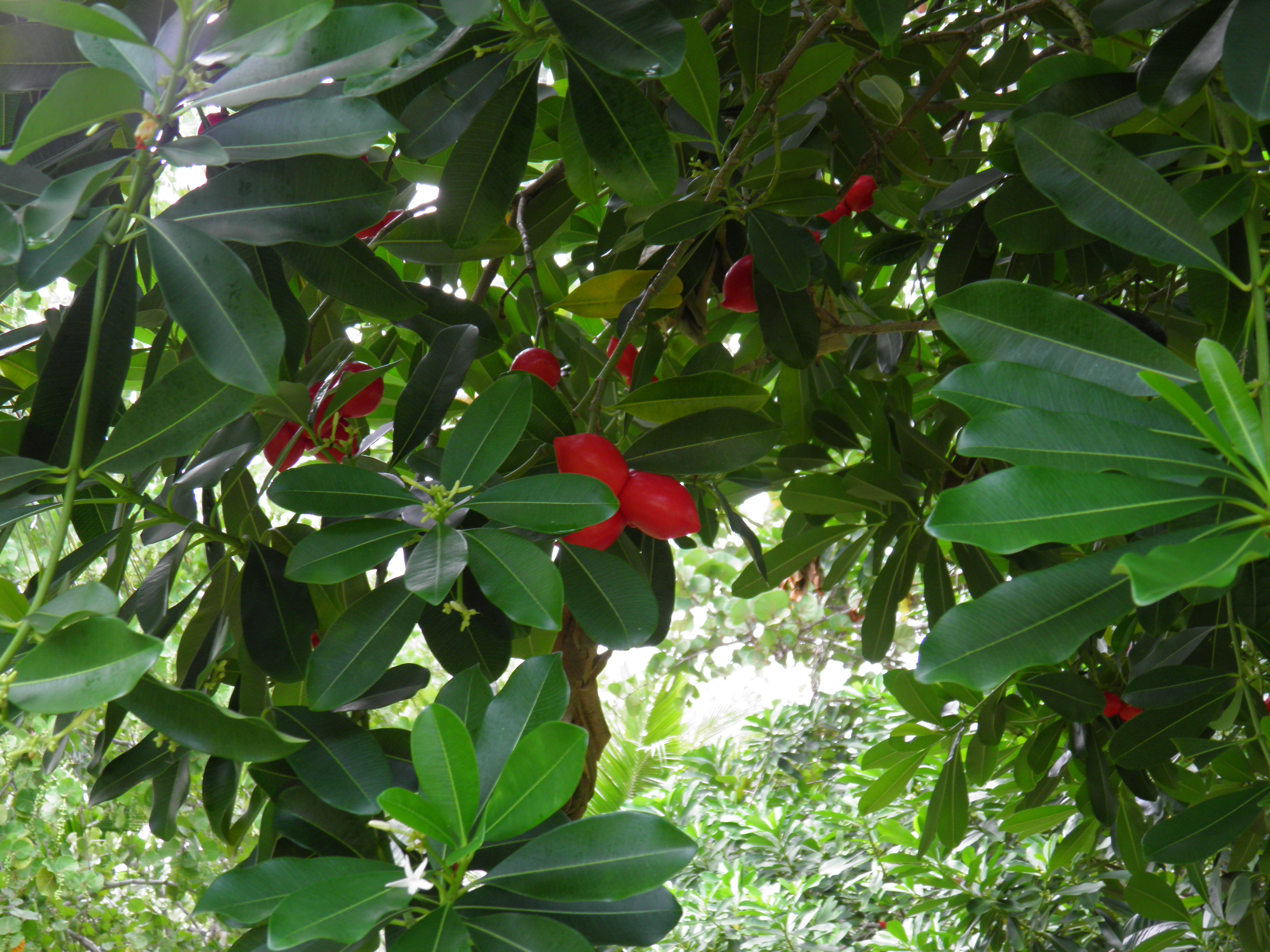
Foliage leaves and fruits of Ochrosia elliptica

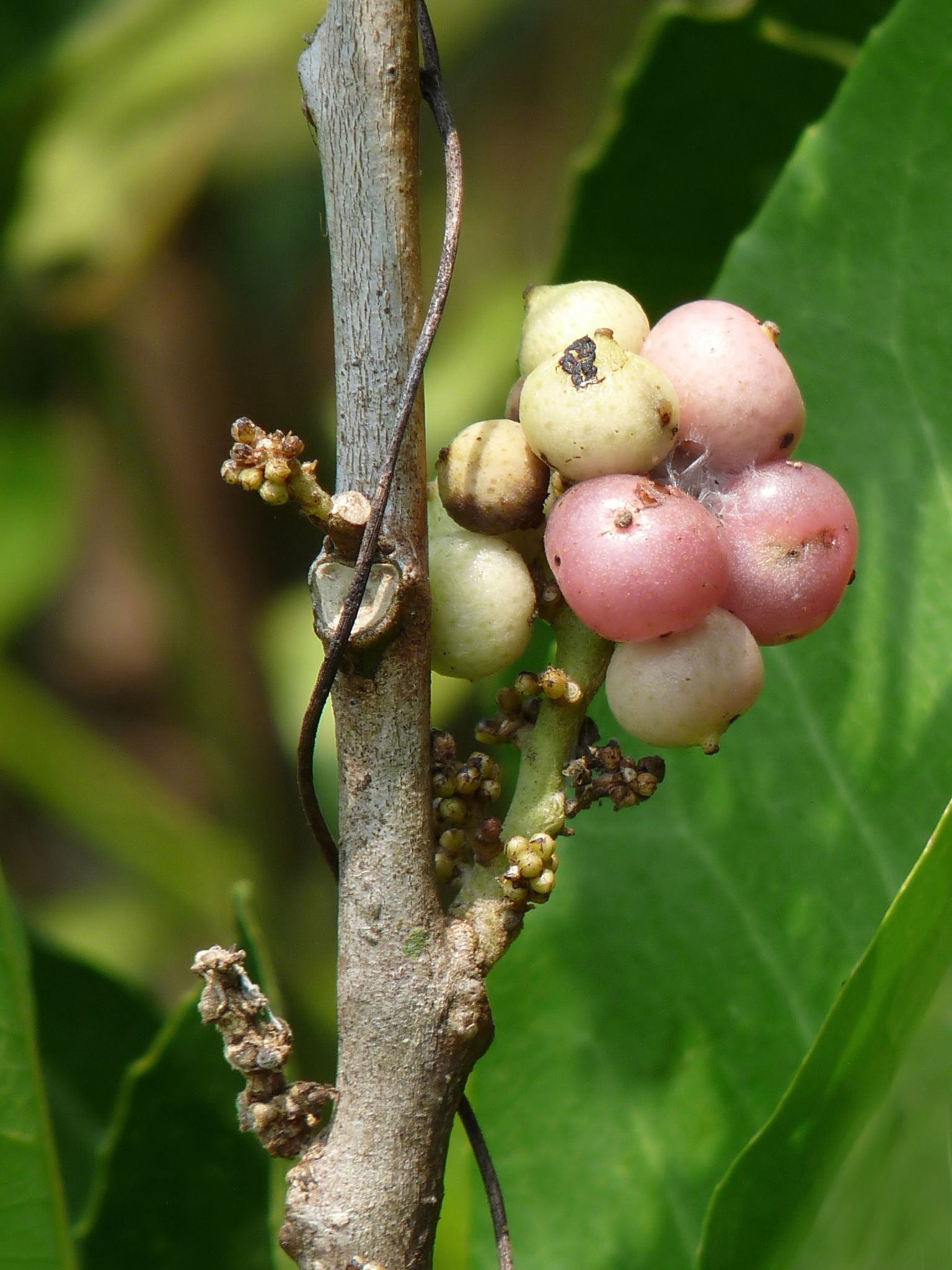
Fruits of Glycosmis pentaphylla

The carbazole alkaloids are natural products of the indole alkaloid type, derived from carbazole.

== Occurrence ==
Carbazole alkaloids with unsubstituted benzene rings occur rarely. Olivacin has been found in the bark of Aspidosperma olivaceum and ellipticin in Ochrosia elliptica. Some carbazole alkaloids, especially glybomin B, have been isolated from Glycosmis pentaphylla.

== Representatives ==
Representatives include, among others, glycozoline, olivacine and ellipticin and further glybomine B.

Glycozoline

Olivacine

Ellipticin

Glybomine B

== Properties ==
Carbazole alkaloids have cytotoxic and antifungal properties. Furthermore, they have detrimental effects against HIV viruses and tumor cells. Olivacin has fluorescent properties.
