= Polychlorinated carbazoles =

General structure of polychlorinated carbazoles

Polychlorinated carbazoles (PCCZ) are a group of chlorinated organic compounds. They are derivatives of carbazole and nitrogen analogues of polychlorinated dibenzofurans.

Polychlorinated carbazoles usually occur as a mixture of various isomers. This mixture can have a certain frequency pattern (congener pattern) from which conclusions can be drawn about the causes of formation.

PCCZs are not manufactured purposefully. They are formed under certain conditions as by-products of thermal processes. In environmental samples, mixed halogenated carbazoles are also found.

congeners
| Chlorine atoms | PCCZ isomers |
|---|---|
| 1 | 4 |
| 2 | 16 |
| 3 | 28 |
| 4 | 38 |
| 5 | 28 |
| 6 | 16 |
| 7 | 4 |
| 8 | 1 |
| Total | 135 |
