= Photoresistor =

Light dependent resistor

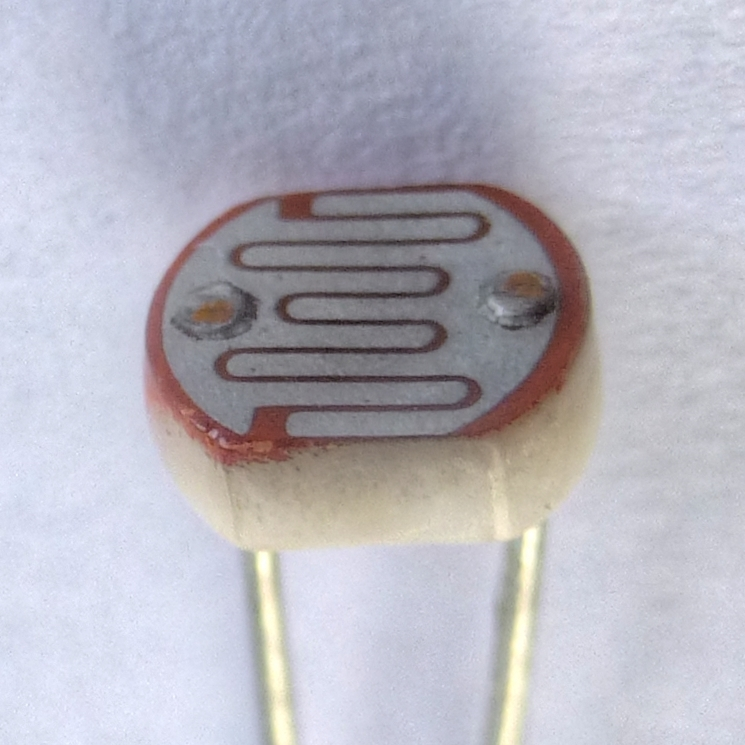
- Component type: Passive
- Working principle: Photoconductivity
- Inventor: Willoughby Smith

Electronic symbol
- The symbol for a photoresistor

A photoresistor (also known as a light-dependent resistor, LDR, or photo-conductive cell) is a passive component that decreases in resistance as a result of increasing illuminance (light) on its sensitive surface, in other words, it exhibits photoconductivity. A photoresistor can be used in light-sensitive detector circuits and light-activated and dark-activated switching circuits acting as a semiconductor resistance. In the dark, a photoresistor can have a resistance as high as several megaohms (MΩ), while in the light, it can have a resistance as low as a few hundred ohms. If incident light on a photoresistor exceeds a certain frequency, photons absorbed by the semiconductor give bound electrons enough energy to jump into the conduction band. The resulting free electrons (and their hole partners) conduct electricity, thereby lowering resistance. The resistance range and sensitivity of a photoresistor can substantially differ among dissimilar devices. Moreover, unique photoresistors may react substantially differently to photons within certain wavelength bands.

A photoelectric device can be either intrinsic or extrinsic. An intrinsic semiconductor has its own charge carriers and is not an efficient semiconductor (such as silicon is). In intrinsic devices, most of the available electrons are in the valence band, and hence the photon must have enough energy to excite the electron across the entire bandgap. Extrinsic devices have impurities, also called dopants, added whose ground state energy is closer to the conduction band; since the electrons do not have as far to jump, lower energy photons (that is, longer wavelengths and lower frequencies) are sufficient to trigger the device. If a sample of silicon has some of its atoms replaced by phosphorus atoms (impurities), there will be extra electrons available for conduction. This is an example of an extrinsic semiconductor.

== Design considerations ==
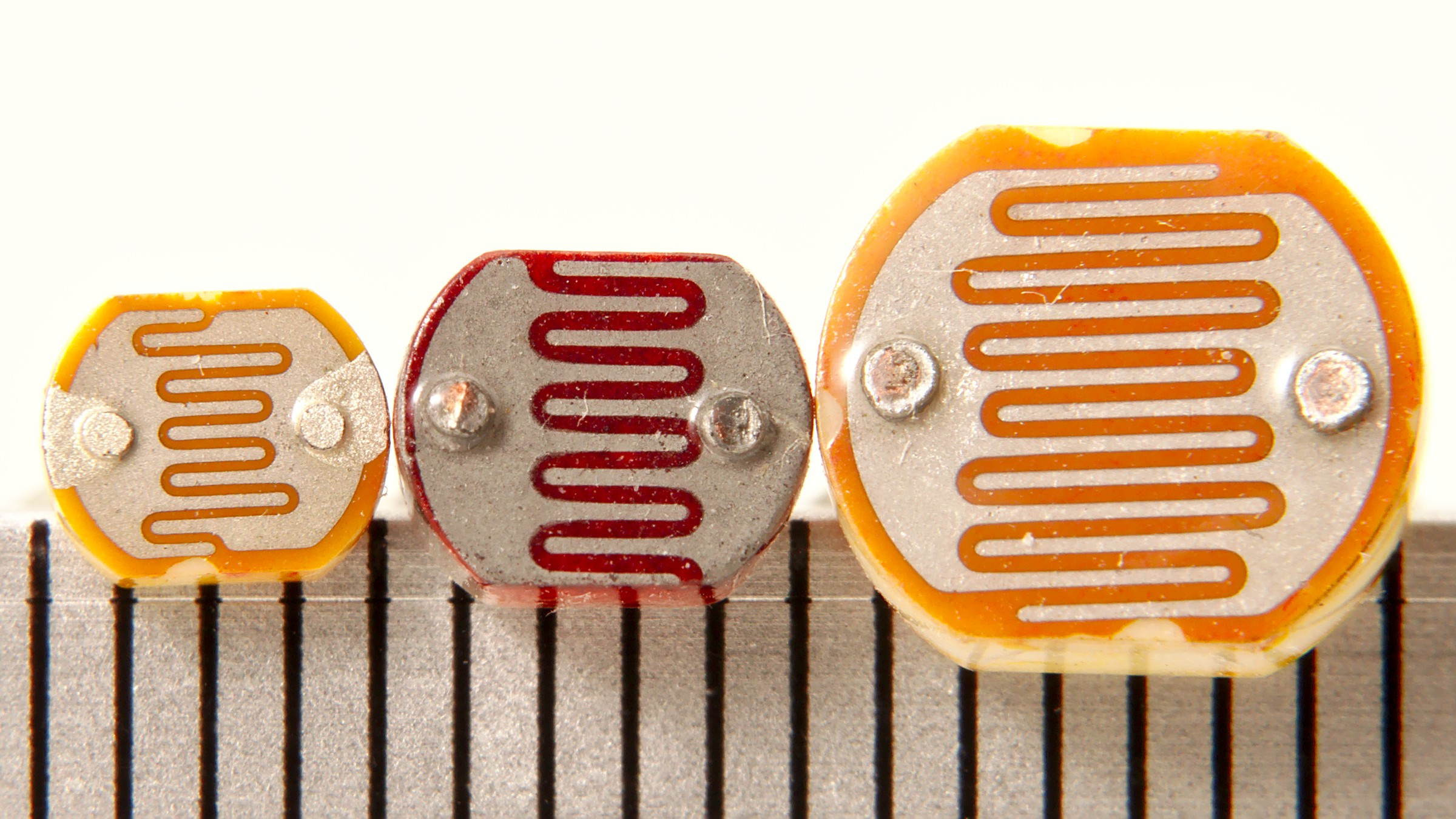
Three photoresistors with scale in mm

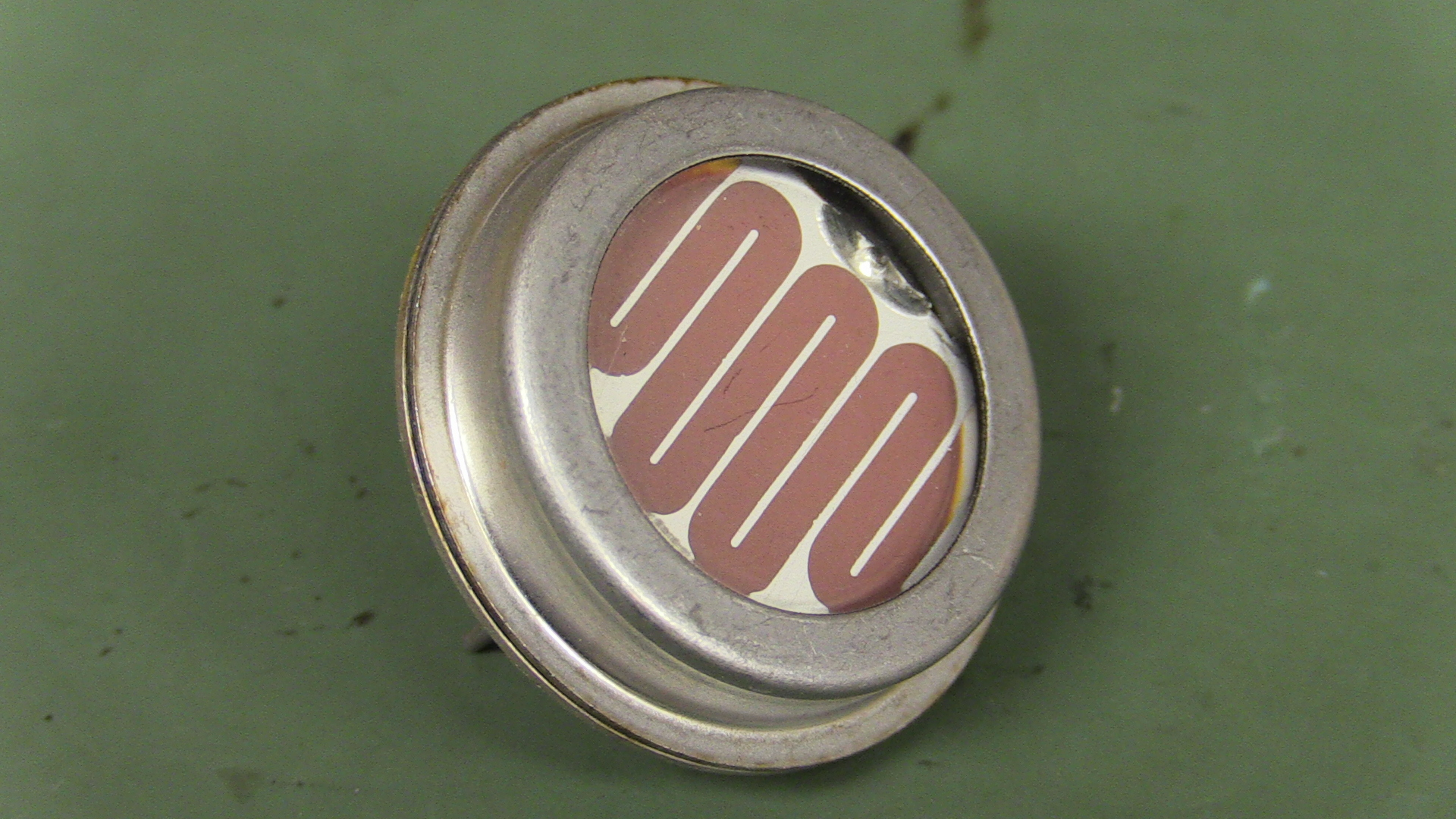
Large CdS photocell from a street light

A photoresistor is less light-sensitive than a photodiode or a phototransistor. The photoresistivity of any photoresistor may vary widely depending on ambient temperature, making them unsuitable for applications requiring precise measurement of or sensitivity to light photons.

Photoresistors also exhibit a certain degree of latency between exposure to light and the subsequent decrease in resistance, usually around 10 milliseconds. The lag time when going from lit to dark environments is even greater, often as long as one second. This property makes them unsuitable for sensing rapidly flashing lights, but is sometimes used to smooth the response of audio signal compression.

== Applications ==
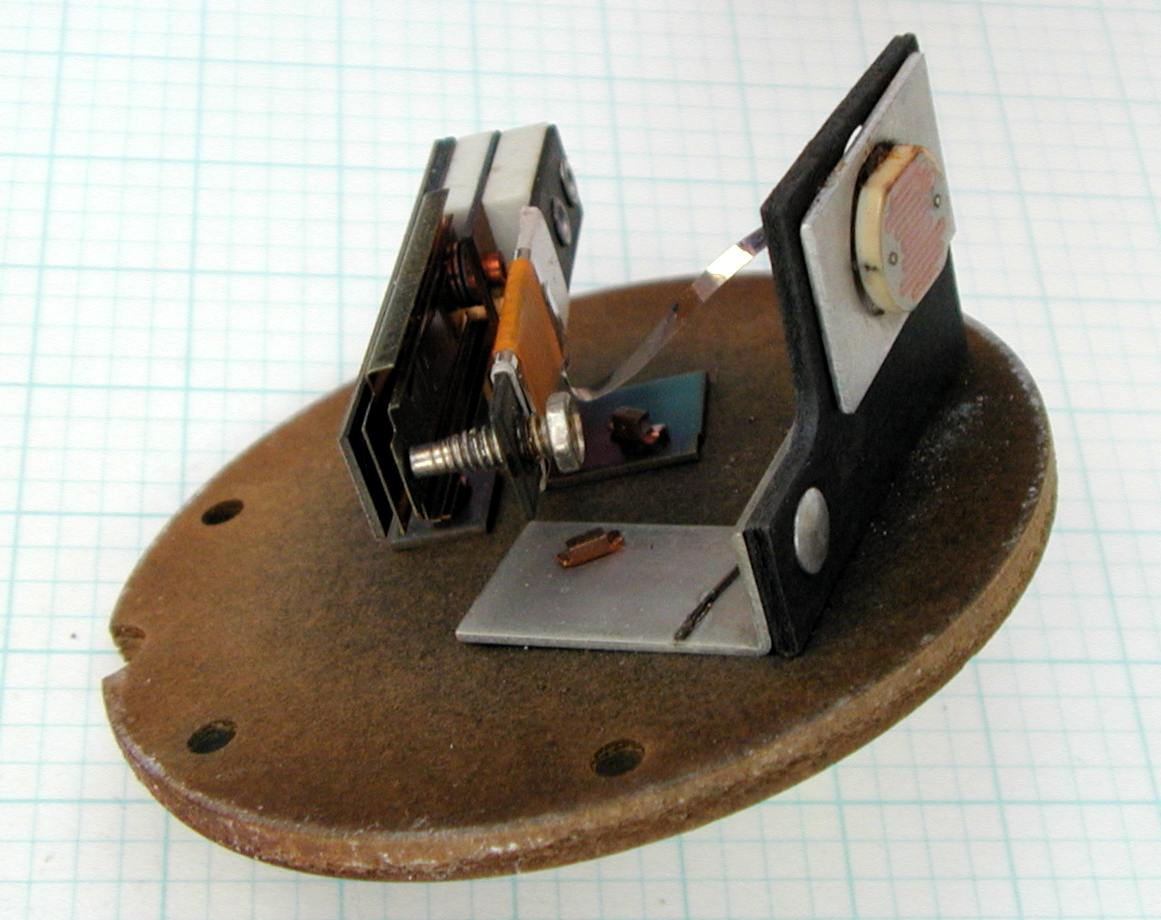
The internal components of a photoelectric control for a typical USA streetlight. The photoresistor is facing rightwards and controls whether current flows through the heater which opens the main power contacts. At night, the heater cools, closing the power contacts, energizing the street light.

Photoresistors come in many types. Inexpensive cadmium sulfide (CdS) cells can be found in many consumer items such as camera light meters, clock radios, alarm devices (as the detector for a light beam), nightlights, outdoor clocks, solar street lamps, and solar road studs, etc.

Photoresistors can be placed in streetlights to control when the light is on. Ambient light falling on the photoresistor causes the streetlight to turn off. Thus energy is saved by ensuring the light is only on during hours of darkness.

Photoresistors are also used in laser-based security systems to detect the change in the light intensity when a person or object passes through the laser beam.

Resistive opto-isolators, also known as vactrols, are formed of a photoresistor in conjunction with a light source. The light source may be a small incandescent or neon lamp, or light-emitting diode. Popularity has waned, but they are still used in audio applications, such as dynamic compressors. A common usage of this application can be found in many guitar amplifiers that incorporate an onboard tremolo effect, as the oscillating light patterns control the level of signal running through the amplifier circuit.

The use of CdS and CdSe photoresistors is severely restricted in Europe due to the RoHS ban on cadmium.

Lead sulfide (PbS) and indium antimonide (InSb) LDRs (light-dependent resistors) are used for the mid-infrared spectral region. Ge:Cu photoconductors are among the best far-infrared detectors available, and are used for infrared astronomy and infrared spectroscopy.

== See also ==
- Optoelectronics
- Photodetector
