= Photorefractive effect =

Nonlinear optical effect

The photorefractive effect is a nonlinear optical effect seen in certain crystals and other materials that respond to light by altering their refractive index. The effect can be used to store temporary, erasable holograms and is useful for holographic data storage. It can also be used to create a phase-conjugate mirror or an optical spatial soliton.

== Mechanism ==
The photorefractive effect occurs in several stages:

1. A photorefractive material is illuminated by coherent beams of light. (In holography, these would be the signal and reference beams). Interference between the beams results in a pattern of dark and light fringes throughout the crystal.
2. In regions where a bright fringe is present, electrons can absorb the light and be photoexcited from an impurity level into the conduction band of the material, leaving an electron hole (a net positive charge). Impurity levels have an energy intermediate between the energies of the valence band and conduction band of the material.
3. Once in the conduction band, the electrons are free to move and diffuse throughout the crystal. Since the electrons are being excited preferentially in the bright fringes, the net electron diffusion current is towards the dark-fringe regions of the material.
4. While in the conduction band, the electrons may with some probability recombine with the holes and return to the impurity levels. The rate at which this recombination takes place determines how far the electrons diffuse, and thus the overall strength of the photorefractive effect in that material. Once back in the impurity level, the electrons are trapped and can no longer move unless re-excited back into the conduction band (by light).
5. With the net redistribution of electrons into the dark regions of the material, leaving holes in the bright areas, the resulting charge distribution causes an electric field, known as a space charge field to be set up in the crystal. Since the electrons and holes are trapped and immobile, the space charge field persists even when the illuminating beams are removed.
6. The internal space charge field, via the electro–optic effect, causes the refractive index of the crystal to change in the regions where the field is strongest. This causes a spatially varying refractive index grating to occur throughout the crystal. The pattern of the grating that is formed follows the light interference pattern originally imposed on the crystal.
7. The refractive index grating can now diffract light shone into the crystal, with the resulting diffraction pattern recreating the original pattern of light stored in the crystal.

== Application ==
The photorefractive effect can be used for dynamic holography, and, in particular, for cleaning of coherent beams. For example, in the case of a hologram, illuminating the grating with just the reference beam causes the reconstruction of the original signal beam. When two coherent laser beams (usually obtained by splitting a laser beam by the use of a beamsplitter into two, and then suitably redirecting by mirrors) cross inside a photorefractive crystal, the resultant refractive index grating diffracts the laser beams. As a result, one beam gains energy and becomes more intense at the expense of light intensity reduction of the other. This phenomenon is an example of two-wave mixing. In this configuration, Bragg diffraction condition is automatically satisfied.

The pattern stored inside the crystal persists until the pattern is erased; this can be done by flooding the crystal with uniform illumination which will excite the electrons back into the conduction band and allow them to be distributed more uniformly.

Photorefractive materials include barium titanate (BaTiO_{3}), lithium niobate (LiNbO_{3}), vanadium doped zinc telluride (ZnTe:V), organic photorefractive materials, certain photopolymers, and some multiple quantum well structures.
