= InPhase Technologies =

American technology company

- Type: Technology company
- Founded: 2000
- Defunct: October 17, 2011 (filed for bankruptcy protection, assets sold March 2012)
- Fate: Acquired by Akonia Holographics after bankruptcy
- Successor: Akonia Holographics
- Headquarters: Longmont, Colorado, United States
- Key people: Nelson Diaz (CEO); Steven Socolof (Lead investor)
- Products: Holographic storage devices and media (Tapestry 300r)
- Owner: Signal Lake Venture Capital (majority equity stake from March 2010)

InPhase Technologies was a technology company developing holographic storage devices and media, based in Longmont, Colorado. InPhase was spun out from Bell Labs in 2000 after roughly a decade of basic research in photopolymers for storage combined with simultaneous research into developing a read/write mechanism for storing and reading out data. Their technology promises multiple terabyte storage; this in fact was achieved in 2009 when InPhase surpassed the density (bits/unit area) of then current magnetic storage media available in commercial markets. InPhase spent 2001-2004 in development to understand the engineering and manufacturing issues of getting a commercial product in a library involving a small number of reader/writers (e.g., 4), a large number of storage media (e.g., 1000) and a mechanical system that could retrieve any piece of storage media and place it in the appropriate reader/writer.

In May 2008, the company first reader, Tapestry 300r, offered customers a storage capacity of 300 GB, with transfer rates of 20 MB/s in read/write mode; the product roadmap would increase both these figures of by at least an order of magnitude over two generations of products. However, the company has failed several times to release the reader on schedule after previously setting release dates of late 2006, and then February 2007. As a result of these delays, InPhase was forced to cut a number of its workforce; currently there is no release date for the drive and storage media visible.

In February 2008, InPhase Technologies was granted a joint patent with video game company Nintendo for a flexure-based scanner for angle-based multiplexing in a holographic storage system.

On March 16, 2010, Signal Lake Venture Capital acquired a majority equity stake in the remains of InPhase. In 2010, InPhase acquired digital holographic storage media manufacturing equipment from Hitachi Maxell in Tokyo, Japan. In 2011, Signal Lake, on behalf of InPhase, acquired the assets of DSM AG in Westerstede, Germany, so InPhase has rights for designing, developing, manufacturing, and supporting digital libraries (autoloaders that can hold one disk drive and fifteen disks with a robot that moves media between slots and disk drives, or libraries that can hold four disk drives and up to 2,140 disks) and a robot picker that moves media between slots and disk drives, to be bundled with sales of drives and media.

On October 17, 2011, InPhase Technologies filed for bankruptcy protection to reorganize under Chapter 11, Title 11, United States Code. All of the InPhase assets were sold at auction in March 2012. Akonia Holographics acquired the InPhase assets, including the critical equipment and know-how, and all of the intellectual property. Akonia Holographics, LLC was officially launched on August 10, 2012 after closing on a $10.8 million investment round. On August 30, 2018, Apple Inc. announced it was acquiring Akonia Holographics.
