= Holographic data storage =

Data storage technology

Holographic data storage is an experimental technology in the area of high-capacity data storage. While magnetic and optical data storage devices rely on individual bits being stored as distinct magnetic or optical changes on the surface of the recording medium, holographic data storage records information throughout the volume of the medium and is capable of recording multiple images in the same area utilizing light at different angles.

Additionally, whereas magnetic and optical data storage records information a bit at a time in a linear fashion, holographic storage is capable of recording and reading millions of bits in parallel, enabling data transfer rates greater than those attained by traditional optical storage.

Prototype versions of holographic drives and removable media have been developed, but no implementation of holographic storage has made it to market.

== Recording data ==
Holographic data storage contains information using an optical interference pattern within a thick, photosensitive optical material. Light from a single laser beam is divided into two, or more, separate optical patterns of dark and light pixels. By adjusting the reference beam angle, wavelength, or media position, a multitude of holograms (theoretically, several thousand) can be stored on a single volume.

== Reading data ==
The stored data is read through the reproduction of the same reference beam used to create the hologram. The reference beam's light is focused on the photosensitive material, illuminating the appropriate interference pattern, the light diffracts on the interference pattern, and projects the pattern onto a detector. The detector is capable of reading the data in parallel, over one million bits at once, resulting in the fast data transfer rate. Files on the holographic drive can be accessed in less than 0.2 seconds.

== Longevity ==
Holographic data storage can provide companies a method to preserve and archive information. The write-once, read many (WORM) approach to data storage would ensure content security, preventing the information from being overwritten or modified. Manufacturers believe this technology can provide safe storage for content without degradation for more than 50 years, far exceeding current data storage options. Counterpoints to this claim are that the evolution of data reader technology has – in the last couple of decades – changed every ten years. If this trend continues, it therefore follows that being able to store data for 50–100 years on one format is irrelevant, because you would migrate the data to a new format after only ten years. However, claimed longevity of storage has, in the past, proven to be a key indicator of shorter-term reliability of storage media. Current optical formats – such as CD – have largely lived up to the original longevity claims (where reputable media makes are used) and have proved to be more reliable shorter-term data carriers than the floppy disk and DAT media they displaced.

== Terms used ==
Sensitivity refers to the extent of refractive index modulation produced per unit of exposure. Diffraction efficiency is proportional to the square of the index modulation times the effective thickness.

The dynamic range determines how many holograms may be multiplexed in a single volume data.

Spatial light modulators (SLM) are pixelated input devices (liquid crystal panels), used to imprint the data to be stored on the object beam.

== Technical aspects ==
Like other media, holographic media is divided into write once (where the storage medium undergoes some irreversible change), and rewritable media (where the change is reversible). Rewritable holographic storage can be achieved via the photorefractive effect in crystals:

- Mutually coherent light from two sources creates an interference pattern in the media. These two sources are called the reference beam and the signal beam.
- Where there is constructive interference the light is bright and electrons can be promoted from the valence band to the conduction band of the material (since the light has given the electrons energy to jump the energy gap). The positively charged vacancies they leave are called holes and they must be immobile in rewritable holographic materials. Where there is destructive interference, there is less light and few electrons are promoted.
- Electrons in the conduction band are free to move in the material. They will experience two opposing forces that determine how they move. The first force is the coulomb force between the electrons and the positive holes that they have been promoted from. This force encourages the electrons to stay put or move back to where they came from. The second is the pseudo-force of diffusion that encourages them to move to areas where electrons are less dense. If the coulomb forces are not too strong, the electrons will move into the dark areas.
- Beginning immediately after being promoted, there is a chance that a given electron will recombine with a hole and move back into the valence band. The faster the rate of recombination, the fewer the number of electrons that will have the chance to move into the dark areas. This rate will affect the strength of the hologram.
- After some electrons have moved into the dark areas and recombined with holes there, there is a permanent space charge field between the electrons that moved to the dark spots and the holes in the bright spots. This leads to a change in the index of refraction due to the electro-optic effect.

When the information is to be retrieved or read out from the hologram, only the reference beam is necessary. The beam is sent into the material in exactly the same way as when the hologram was written. As a result of the index changes in the material that were created during writing, the beam splits into two parts. One of these parts recreates the signal beam where the information is stored. Something like a CCD camera can be used to convert this information into a more usable form.

Holograms can theoretically store one bit per cubic block the size of the wavelength of light in writing. For example, light from a helium–neon laser is red, 632.8 nm wavelength light. Using light of this wavelength, perfect holographic storage could store 500 megabytes per cubic millimeter. At the extreme end of the laser spectrum, fluorine excimer laser at 157 nm could store 30 gigabytes per cubic millimeter. In practice, the data density would be much lower, for at least four reasons:

- The need to add error-correction
- The need to accommodate imperfections or limitations in the optical system
- Economic payoff (higher densities may cost disproportionately more to achieve)
- Design technique limitations—a problem currently faced in magnetic Hard Drives wherein magnetic domain configuration prevents manufacture of disks that fully utilize the theoretical limits of the technology.

Despite those limitations, it is possible to optimize the storage capacity using all-optical signal processing techniques.

Unlike current storage technologies that record and read one data bit at a time, holographic memory writes and reads data in parallel in a single flash of light.

== Two-color recording ==
Set up for holographic recording

For two-color holographic recording, the reference and signal beam fixed to a particular wavelength (green, red or IR) and the sensitizing/gating beam is a separate, shorter wavelength (blue or UV). The sensitizing/gating beam is used to sensitize the material before and during the recording process, while the information is recorded in the crystal via the reference and signal beams. It is shone intermittently on the crystal during the recording process for measuring the diffracted beam intensity. Readout is achieved by illumination with the reference beam alone. Hence the readout beam with a longer wavelength would not be able to excite the recombined electrons from the deep trap centers during readout, as they need the sensitizing light with shorter wavelength to erase them.

Usually, for two-color holographic recording, two different dopants are required to promote trap centers, which belong to transition metal and rare-earth elements and are sensitive to certain wavelengths. By using two dopants, more trap centers would be created in the lithium niobate crystal. Namely a shallow and a deep trap would be created. The concept now is to use the sensitizing light to excite electrons from the deep trap farther from the valence band to the conduction band and then to recombine at the shallow traps nearer to the conduction band. The reference and signal beam would then be used to excite the electrons from the shallow traps back to the deep traps. The information would hence be stored in the deep traps. Reading would be done with the reference beam since the electrons can no longer be excited out of the deep traps by the long wavelength beam.

== Effect of annealing ==
For a doubly doped lithium niobate (LiNbO_{3}) crystal there exists an optimum oxidation/reduction state for desired performance. This optimum depends on the doping levels of shallow and deep traps as well as the annealing conditions for the crystal samples. This optimum state generally occurs when 95–98% of the deep traps are filled. In a strongly oxidized sample holograms cannot be easily recorded and the diffraction efficiency is very low. This is because the shallow trap is completely empty and the deep trap is also almost devoid of electrons. In a highly reduced sample on the other hand, the deep traps are completely filled and the shallow traps are also partially filled. This results in very good sensitivity (fast recording) and high diffraction efficiency due to the availability of electrons in the shallow traps. However, during readout, all the deep traps get filled quickly and the resulting holograms reside in the shallow traps where they are totally erased by further readout. Hence after extensive readout the diffraction efficiency drops to zero and the hologram stored cannot be fixed.

== Development and marketing ==
Developed from the pioneering work on holography in photorefractive media and holographic data storage of Gerard A. Alphonse, InPhase conducted public demonstrations of a prototype commercial storage device, at the National Association of Broadcasters 2005 (NAB) convention in Las Vegas, at the Maxell Corporation of America booth.

The three main companies involved in developing holographic memory, as of 2002, were InPhase and Polaroid spinoff Aprilis in the United States, and Optware in Japan. Although holographic memory has been discussed since the 1960s, and has been touted for near-term commercial application at least since 2001, it has yet to convince critics that it can find a viable market. As of 2002, planned holographic products did not aim to compete head to head with hard drives, but instead to find a market niche based on virtues such as speed of access.

InPhase Technologies, after several announcements and subsequent delays in 2006 and 2007, announced that it would soon be introducing a flagship product. InPhase went out of business in February 2010 and had its assets seized by the state of Colorado for back taxes. The company had reportedly gone through $100 million but the lead investor was unable to raise more capital. The assets and know-how of InPhase has been acquired by Apple who is thought to plan using it for augmented reality.

During CES 2006, a workable holographic drive was tested and stored 300 GB of memory compared to Blu-ray's 100 GB. It has been announced that hologram disks will be a post-Blu-ray storage device.

In April 2009, GE Global Research demonstrated their own holographic storage material that could allow for discs that utilize similar read mechanisms as those found on Blu-ray Disc players.

== Video game market ==
Nintendo filed a Joint Research Agreement with InPhase for holographic storage in 2008.

Nintendo is also mentioned in the patent as a joint applicant: "... disclosure is herein made that the claimed invention was made pursuant to a Joint Research Agreement as defined in 35 U.S.C. 103 (c)(3), that was in effect on or before the date the claimed invention was made, and as a result of activities undertaken within the scope of the Joint Research Agreement, by or on the behalf of Nintendo Co., and InPhase Technologies, Inc.".

== In fiction ==
In Star Wars, the Jedi use holocrons and holographic crystals to store data about their history.

In 2010: The Year We Make Contact, a tapeworm had to be employed to erase HAL's holographic memory as "chronological erasures would not work".

In Robot and Frank, Robot has a holographic memory which can be half erased but, will be in half the resolution.

== See also ==
- Holographic Versatile Card
- Holographic Versatile Disc
- Holographic associative memory
- 3D optical data storage
- 5D optical data storage
- List of emerging technologies
- Holography
- Holographic Data Storage System
