= Aspidosperma olivaceum =

Scientific classification
- Kingdom: Plantae
- Clade: Tracheophytes
- Clade: Angiosperms
- Clade: Eudicots
- Clade: Asterids
- Order: Gentianales
- Family: Apocynaceae
- Genus: Aspidosperma
- Species: A. olivaceum

Binomial name
- Aspidosperma olivaceum Müll.Arg.

Synonyms
- Macaglia olivacea (Müll.Arg.) Kuntze; Aspidosperma sellowii Müll.Arg.; Thyroma sellowii (Müll.Arg.) Miers; Aspidosperma bello-horizontinum Silveira

Species of tree

Aspidosperma olivaceum is a timber tree native to Southeast Brazil. It is common in Atlantic Forest, Cerrado, Caatinga, and Pantanal vegetation.
