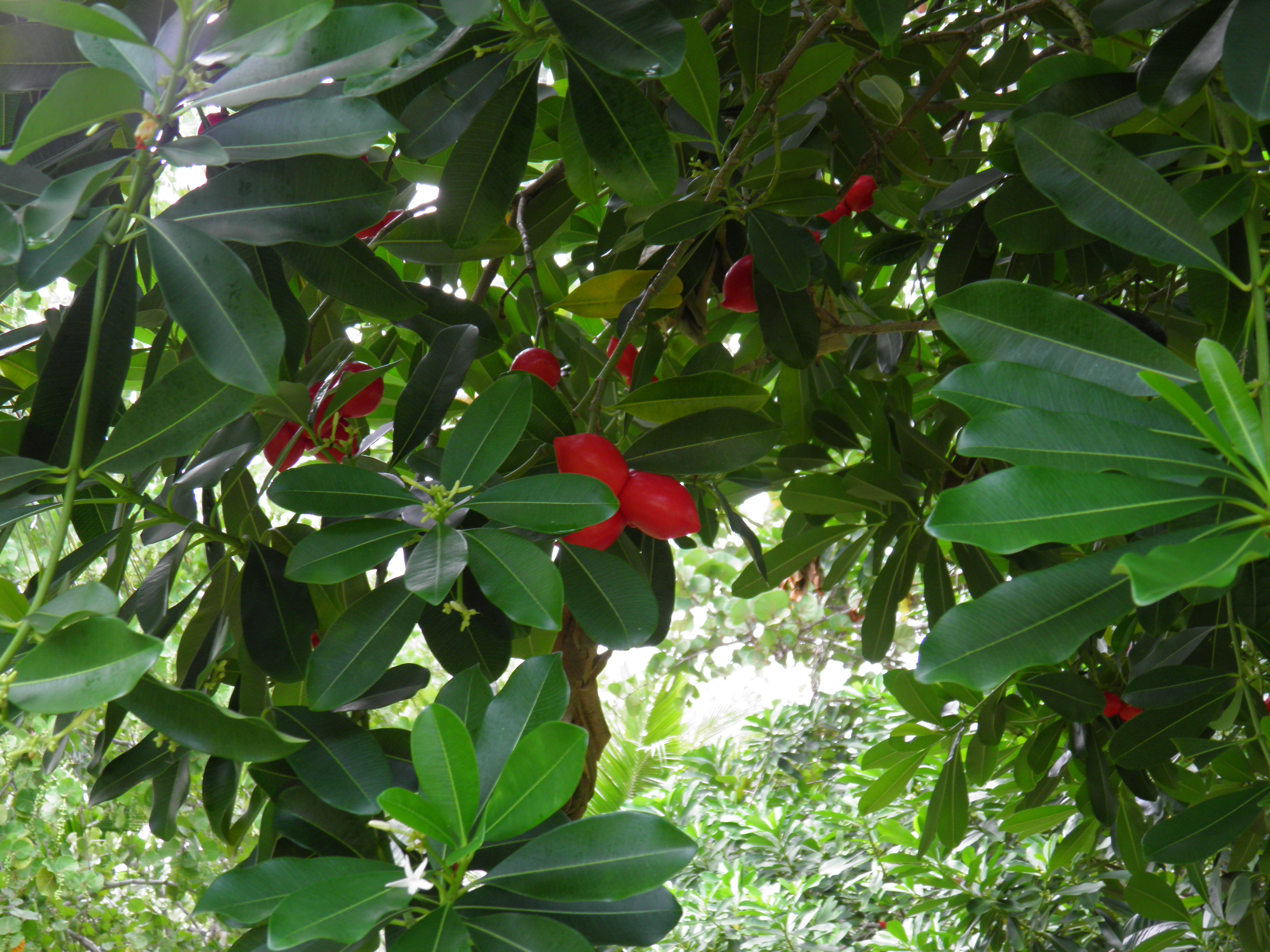
- An Ochrosia elliptica in the Bahamas

Conservation status
- Least Concern (NCA)
- Least Concern (IUCN 3.1)

Scientific classification
- Kingdom: Plantae
- Clade: Tracheophytes
- Clade: Angiosperms
- Clade: Eudicots
- Clade: Asterids
- Order: Gentianales
- Family: Apocynaceae
- Genus: Ochrosia
- Species: O. elliptica

Binomial name
- Ochrosia elliptica Labill.

Synonyms
- Homotypic: Bleekeria elliptica (Labill.) Koidz.; Excavatia elliptica (Labill.) Markgr.; Lactaria elliptica (Labill.) Kuntze; Heterotypic: Bleekeria calocarpa Hassk.; Bleekeria kalocarpa Hassk.; Lactaria calocarpa (Hassk.) Hassk.; Lactaria parviflora (G.Don) Kuntze; Ochrosia calocarpa (Hassk.) Miq.; Ochrosia elliptica f. syncarpa Boiteau; Ochrosia noumeensis Baill. ex Guillaumin; Ochrosia parviflora G.Don

= Ochrosia elliptica =

Northern ochrosia

Species of plant in the family Apocynaceae

Ochrosia elliptica, commonly known as northern ochrosia, bloodhorn, scarlet wedge-apple, or simply ochrosia, is a tree in the dogbane family Apocynaceae native to north-eastern Australia and the southwest Pacific.

== Description ==
The northern ochrosia is a small tree growing to about 6 m (20 ft) high. The leaves are glossy dark green above and paler below, arranged in whorls of three or four, and held on petioles around 5 to 10 mm (0.20 to 0.39 in) long. They have around 20–25 distinct secondary (lateral) veins and one or two intramarginal veins (i.e. a vein that parallels the leaf margin). The tertiary venation is obscure on the upper surface. The leaf shape is obovate to broadly elliptic, and they measure up to 17 cm (6.7 in) long by 7 cm (2.8 in) wide.

The flowers occur in axilliary clusters and are small, yellow/white and fragrant. They are followed by pairs of striking red fruit 5–6 cm long by 2–3 cm in diameter, which resemble elongated tomatoes or a pair of red horns. The fruits are poisonous, and plants bleed white sap copiously when wounded.

== Uses ==
The plant is harvested from the wild for local use as a medicine and source of beads. It is cultivated for its medicinal use in China. It is widely distributed as an ornamental, being valued for its startling bright red fruits and dense clusters of cream flowers that are produced throughout the year on an open spreading leafy canopy.

Its fruit and sap are highly poisonous.

== Other names ==
China: Gu cheng mei gui shu.

English: Berrywood tree, Bloodhorn, Elliptic yellowwood, Mangrove ochrosia, Wedge apple.
