= Photoconductivity =

Material property in which absorbing EM radiation increases electrical conductivity

Photoconductivity is an optical and electrical phenomenon in which a material becomes more electrically conductive due to the absorption of electromagnetic radiation such as visible light, ultraviolet light, infrared light, or gamma radiation.

When light is absorbed by a material such as a semiconductor, the number of free electrons and holes increases, resulting in increased electrical conductivity. To cause excitation, the light that strikes the semiconductor must have enough energy to raise electrons across the band gap, or to excite the impurities within the band gap. When a bias voltage and a load resistor are used in series with the semiconductor, a voltage drop across the load resistors can be measured when the change in electrical conductivity of the material varies the current through the circuit.

Classic examples of photoconductive materials include:

- photographic film: Kodachrome, Fujifilm, Agfachrome, Ilford, etc., based on silver sulfide and silver bromide.
- the conductive polymer polyvinylcarbazole, used extensively in photocopying (xerography);
- lead sulfide, used in infrared detection applications, such as the U.S. Sidewinder and Soviet (now Russian) Atoll heat-seeking missiles;
- selenium, employed in early television and xerography.

Molecular photoconductors include organic, inorganic, and – more rarely – coordination compounds.

== Applications ==
When a photoconductive material is connected as part of a circuit, it functions as a resistor whose resistance depends on the light intensity. In this context, the material is called a photoresistor (also called light-dependent resistor or photoconductor). The most common application of photoresistors is as photodetectors, i.e. devices that measure light intensity. Photoresistors are not the only type of photodetector—other types include charge-coupled devices (CCDs), photodiodes and phototransistors—but they are among the most common. Some photodetector applications in which photoresistors are often used include camera light meters, street lights, clock radios, infrared detectors, nanophotonic systems and low-dimensional photo-sensors devices.

== Sensitization ==
Sensitization is an important engineering procedure to amplify the response of photoconductive materials. The photoconductive gain is proportional to the lifetime of photo-excited carriers (either electrons or holes). Sensitization involves intentional impurity doping that saturates native recombination centers with a short characteristic lifetime, and replacing these centers with new recombination centers having a longer lifetime. This procedure, when done correctly, results in an increase in the photoconductive gain of several orders of magnitude and is used in the production of commercial photoconductive devices. The text by Albert Rose is the work of reference for sensitization.

== Negative photoconductivity ==
Some materials exhibit deterioration in photoconductivity upon exposure to illumination. One prominent example is hydrogenated amorphous silicon (a-Si:H) in which a metastable reduction in photoconductivity is observable (see Staebler–Wronski effect). Other materials that were reported to exhibit negative photoconductivity include ZnO nanowires, molybdenum disulfide, graphene, indium arsenide nanowires, decorated carbon nanotubes, and metal nanoparticles.

Negative photoconductivity has also been observed in N-polar AlGaN/GaN quantum-well heterostructures incorporating GaN/AlN superlattice back barriers. The introduction of a GaN/AlN superlattice back barrier induces a transition from positive photoconductivity (PPC) to negative photoconductivity (NPC) under infrared illumination at room temperature. The effect is attributed to the excitation of hot electrons from the two-dimensional electron gas and their subsequent trapping in the superlattice. The observed NPC yield exceeded 85%, representing one of the largest negative photoconductivity responses reported in semiconductor systems, and remained relatively stable up to 400 K.

Under an applied AC voltage and upon UV illumination, ZnO nanowires exhibit a continuous transition from positive to negative photoconductivity as a function of the AC frequency. ZnO nanowires also display a frequency-driven metal-insulator transition at room temperature. The responsible mechanism for both transitions has been attributed to a competition between bulk conduction and surface conduction. The frequency-driven bulk-to-surface transition of conductivity is expected to be a generic character of semiconductor nanostructures with the large surface-to-volume ratio.

== Magnetic photoconductivity ==
In 2016 it was demonstrated that in some photoconductive material a magnetic order can exist. One prominent example is CH_{3}NH_{3}(Mn:Pb)I_{3}. In this material a light induced magnetization melting was also demonstrated thus could be used in magneto optical devices and data storage.

== Photoconductivity spectroscopy ==
The characterization technique called photoconductivity spectroscopy (also known as photocurrent spectroscopy) is widely used in studying optoelectronic properties of semiconductors.

== See also ==
- Photodiode
- Photoresistor (LDR)
- Photocurrent
- Photoconductive polymer
- Infrared detector
  - Lead selenide (PbSe)
  - Indium antimonide (InSb)
