= Élodie Bernard =

French writer, adventurer and entrepreneur

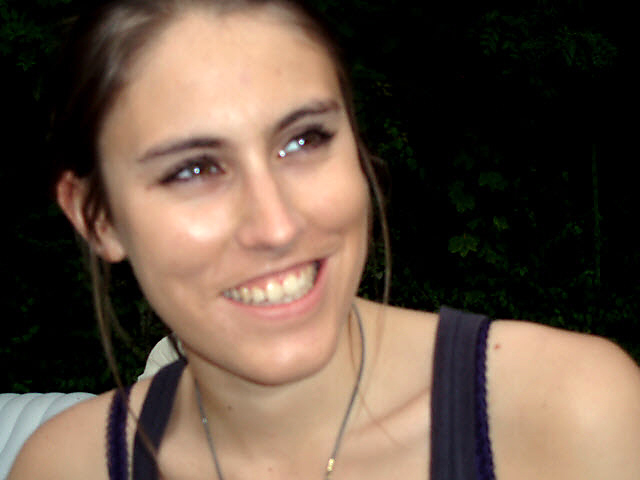
- Born: 1984 (age 41–42)
- Occupations: Writer, travel writer, entrepreneur

Élodie Bernard is a French writer, adventurer and entrepreneur, born in June 1984 in Troyes.

== Biography ==
=== Family and training ===
Élodie Bernard traveled the Andes, the Himalayas, Karakorum, and the Hindu Kush with her father at a very young age, which made her familiar with long-distance adventures. Her parents are dental surgeons, settled in Troyes, in the Aube.

Élodie Bernard is a graduate of the Institut d'études politiques de Paris and the Université Panthéon-Sorbonne in international relations and has taken various cross-disciplinary courses, notably in psychoanalysis at the Université Paris-VIII and at the École de guerre économique.

She is a member of the Society of French Explorers.

=== Adventure in Tibet ===
Like Alexandra David-Néel before her, Élodie Bernard entered Tibet, then closed to foreigners by the Chinese authorities, clandestinely. At the age of only 24, following the unrest in Tibet in March 2008, she boarded buses and trucks and travelled through Tibet, from Amdo to Kham to Lhasa, alone and without permission, during the Beijing Olympics. Despite the terror in Tibet, she met Tibetans and Chinese who confided in her and invited her to their homes. She was eventually spotted by agents of the Public Security Bureau and deported to Beijing.

At the end of her clandestine stay in Lhasa, she published Le vol du peon mène à Lhassa (The Flight of the Peacock Leads to Lhasa), her first travel story, gathering testimonies and her experience in Tibet. For television journalist Philippe Lefait, the essence of this adventure is "in the chance and poetry of the encounters, the smell of butter that accompanies the tea, the fear of controls, the courage of those who testify, the mystery of the spirituality of a people, the commitment and resistance of the nuns and monks."

In November 2010, her book, Le vol du peon mène à Lhassa, was awarded the Golden Fleece Prize for the book of lived adventure by the Book Jury, chaired by the writer Sylvain Tesson. Tesson spoke of the book as an "open window on the world."

She regularly gives her testimony on the situation in Tibet. She is the author of several articles on Tibet, one of which, published by Mediapart, is co-signed by the ecologists Eva Joly and Jean-Marc Brûlé.

Her experience in Tibet is included in the book Femmes d'Exception by Célyne Baÿt-Darcourt, published by France Info and Tallandier.

=== Middle East ===
Since 2006, Élodie has been collaborating with La Revue de Téhéran, Iran's leading French-language cultural magazine, after having worked in Tehran during the year. She has been a regular visitor to Iran since 2005.

In the winter of 2010–2011, Elodie moved between France and the Middle East to set up her competitive intelligence consulting company, Networld-Risk. She regularly publishes newsletters on Iran and the Middle East, as well as geopolitical analyses.

== Publications ==
=== Books ===
Travel stories

- 2010 : Le Vol du paon mène à Lhassa, Gallimard ISBN 978-2-07-012495-4

Collective works

- 2012 : L'Almanach des voyageurs, "La fin d'un monde. Lettre à Mawlânâ Rûmî", sous la direction de Jean-Claude Perrier, Magellan & Cie ISBN 978-2-35074-241-0
- 2013 : L'Almanach des voyageurs, "Babel, une tour au milieu des ruines", sous la direction de Jean-Claude Perrier, Magellan & Cie ISBN 978-2-35074-264-9

=== Articles ===
Geopolitical press articles

- "Damskaïa, une vodka russe version féminine", Regard sur l'Est, 1 July 2008
- "Au Tibet, l'ordre et l'indifférence règnent," written pseudonymously, Le Monde, 14 August 2008
- "Un moine tibétain : au village, on n'ose plus me regarder", written pseudonymously, Nouvel Obs, 15 March 2009
- "Le Tibet, un combat profondément écologiste", co-author, Mediapart, 9 March 2012
- "Le Tibet indigné", Yahoo pour elles, 12 March 2012
- "Le rêve de Tawakkol Karman", Muze, January / February / March 2012
- "Sous le niqab, un regard", Muze, January / February / March 2012
- "Entretien avec la photographe yéménite Boushra Almutawakel", Muze, January / February / March 2012
- "La langue persane au commencement des routes de la Soie", La Revue de Téhéran, February 2013
- "Perses et Chinois au temps de l'Empire mongol", La Revue de Téhéran, February 2014
- "La Géorgie et les Géorgiens iraniens à l'époque safavide", La Revue de Téhéran, July 2014
- "Négocier en Iran, c'est négocier dans le temps : l'art de la diplomatie iranienne," Les Echos, 8 July 2015
- "L'Iran : une puissance réhabilitée", Le Figaro, 17 July 2015
- "Négociations avec les Iraniens, mode d'emploi", France TV Info, 23 July 2015
- "Par delà les plus hautes frontières du monde, au Tibet", Libération Champagne, 10 March 2017
- "Cet été, osez le risque mais soyez vigilant," TV5 Monde, 8 July 2017

Scientific articles

- "Prix bas du pétrole : l'"OPEP+" dans la tourmente", chapitre Iran, Etudes de l'IFRI, juin 2018
