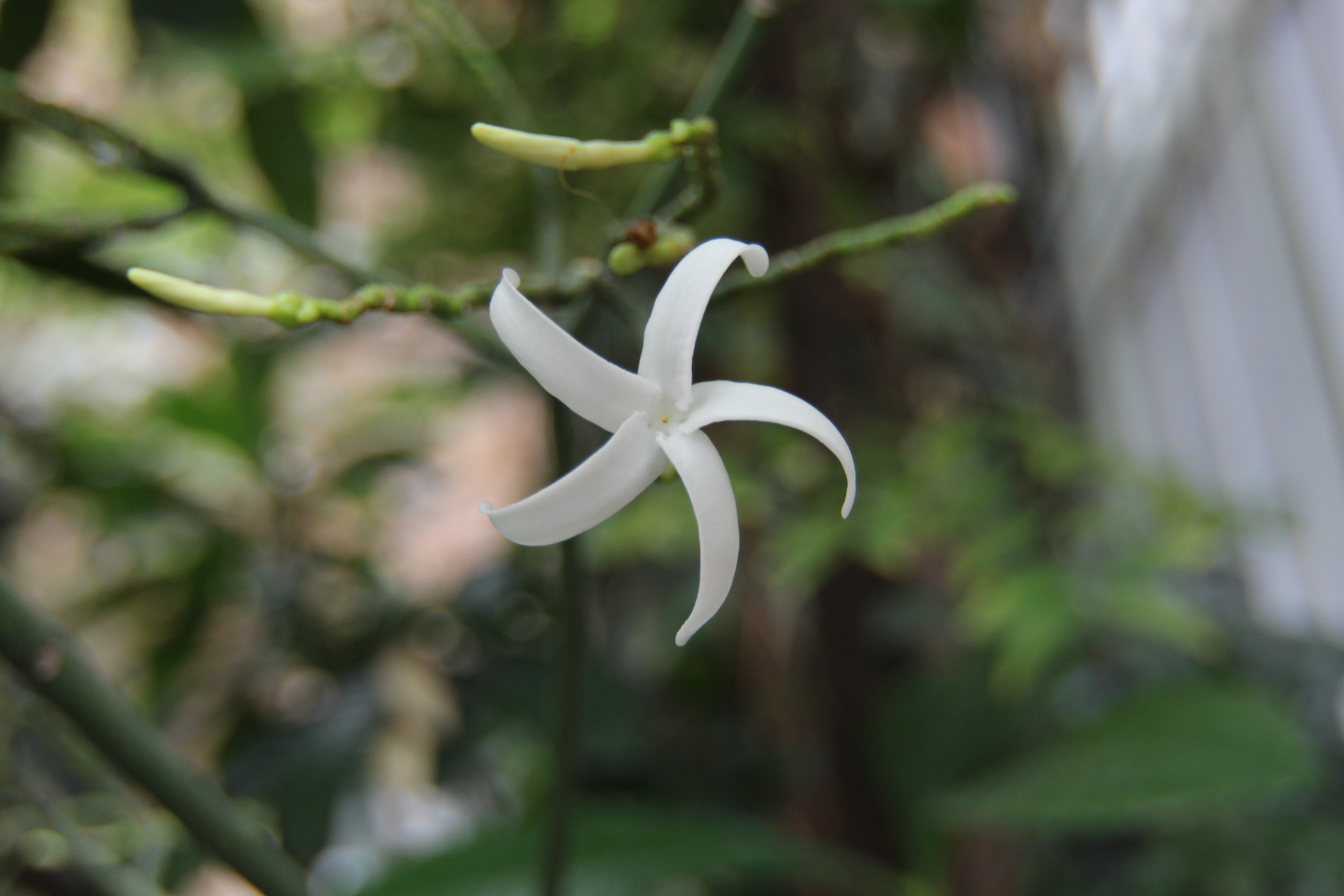

Conservation status
- Vulnerable (IUCN 2.3)

Scientific classification
- Kingdom: Plantae
- Clade: Tracheophytes
- Clade: Angiosperms
- Clade: Eudicots
- Clade: Asterids
- Order: Gentianales
- Family: Apocynaceae
- Genus: Ochrosia
- Species: O. grandiflora

Binomial name
- Ochrosia grandiflora Boiteau

= Ochrosia grandiflora =

Species of plant

Ochrosia grandiflora is a species of plant in the family Apocynaceae. It is endemic to northwest and central New Caledonia. It grows primarily in the wetland tropical biome, and is found naturally as undergrowth in lowland gallery forest on schist or calcareous substrates. It is relatively rare, and was first described by Pierre Boiteau in 1975. According to Boiteau, it can reach the size of an 8- to 12-meter tree, but can be reduced to a 4-meter-tall (13 ft) shrub.
