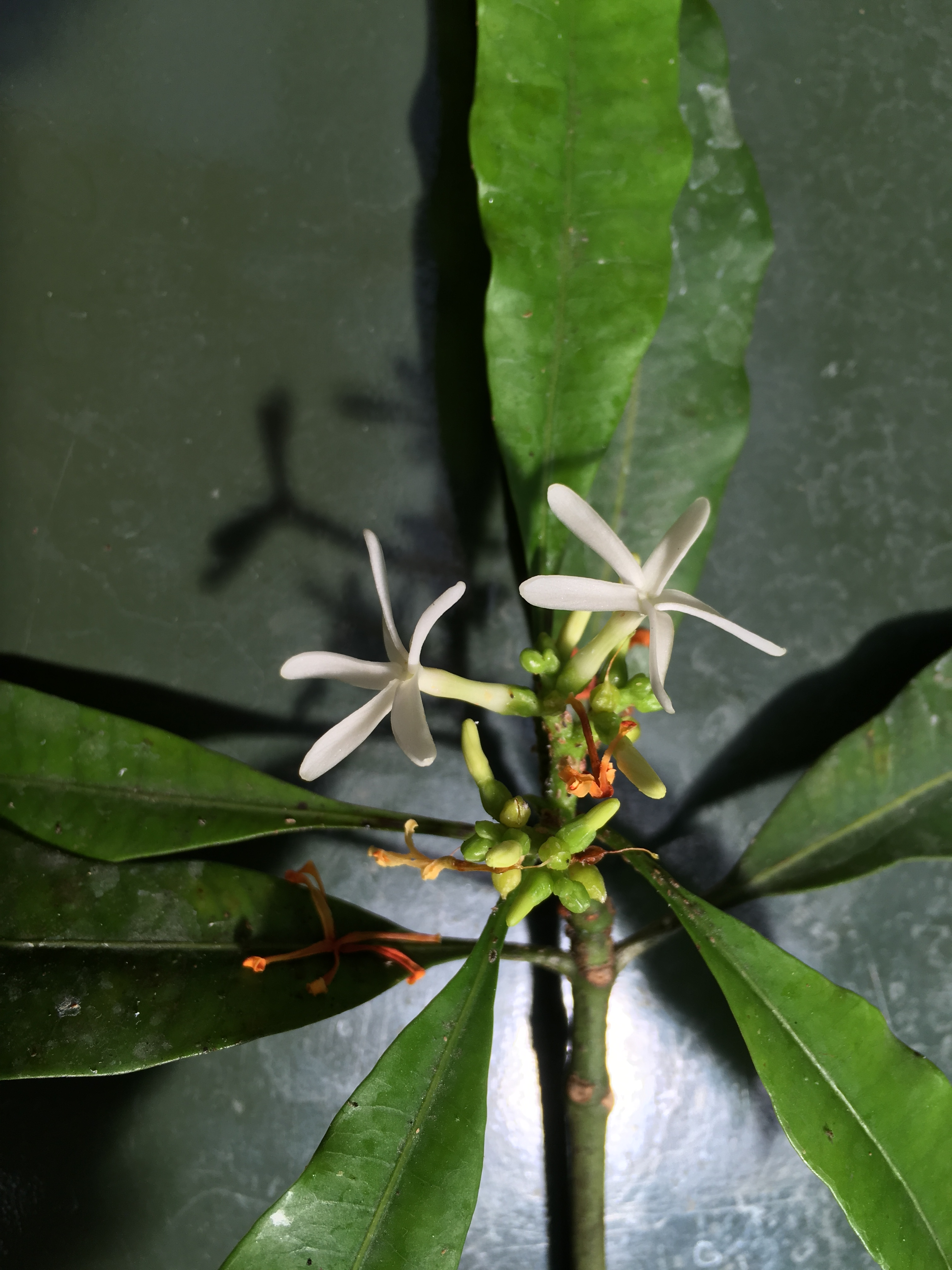

Conservation status
- Critically Endangered (IUCN 3.1)

Scientific classification
- Kingdom: Plantae
- Clade: Tracheophytes
- Clade: Angiosperms
- Clade: Eudicots
- Clade: Asterids
- Order: Gentianales
- Family: Apocynaceae
- Genus: Ochrosia
- Species: O. inventorum

Binomial name
- Ochrosia inventorum L.Allorge

= Ochrosia inventorum =

Species of flowering plant

Ochrosia inventorum is a species of flowering plant in the family Apocynaceae. It is a tree endemic to New Caledonia.
