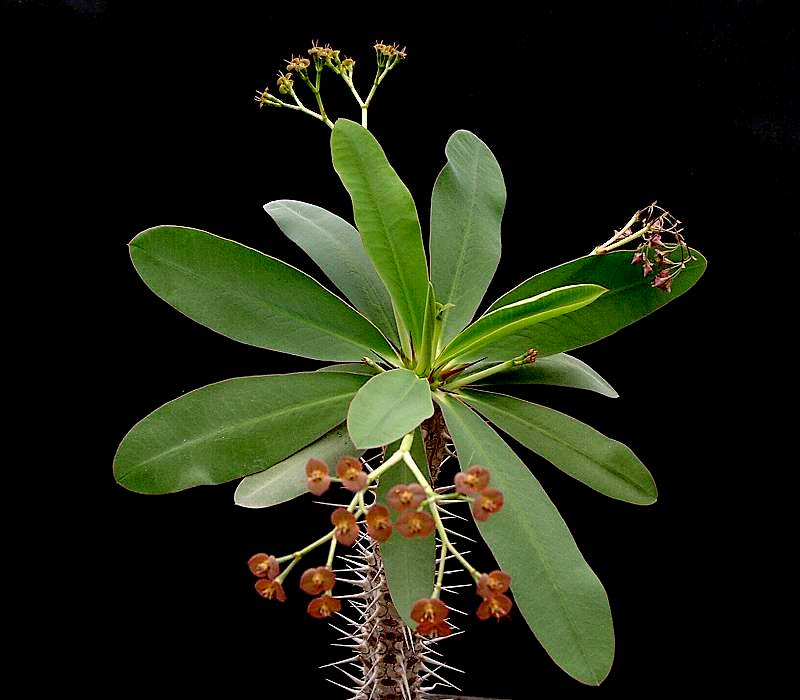
- Identified as Euphorbia horombensis

Scientific classification
- Kingdom: Plantae
- Clade: Tracheophytes
- Clade: Angiosperms
- Clade: Eudicots
- Clade: Rosids
- Order: Malpighiales
- Family: Euphorbiaceae
- Genus: Euphorbia
- Species: E. leandriana

Binomial name
- Euphorbia leandriana Boiteau

Synonyms
- Euphorbia horombensis

= Euphorbia leandriana =

Plant species in the spurge family

Euphorbia leandriana is a species of spiny spurge from southern Madagascar.

== Description ==
Euphorbia leandriana is a shrub growing to 2 meters in height with a substantial stem and many branches. Its overall form is pyramidal. The leaves are about 7 cm long and 0.8 cm wide. They are found only at the ends of the branches and have stipules at the base. The spines are flattened at the base and 1–2 cm long.

== Taxonomy ==
In 1941 Pierre Boiteau scientifically described a new species in the genus Euphorbia, naming it Euphorbia leandriana. Together with its genus it is classified in the Euphorbiaceae and it has one heterotypic synonym according to Plants of the World Online, Euphorbia horombensis published in 1955 by Eugène Ursch and Jacques Désiré Leandri. Euphorbia horombensis was combined with it by Haevermans and Hetterscheid in 2021. However, Eggli and Nyffeler published descriptions of both species their 2023 book covering Euphorbia.

== Range, habitat, conservation ==
The species grows in southern Madagascar in Beroroha within the drainage of the Mangoky River on sandstone escarpments. Euphorbia horombensis was evaluated by Haevermans in 2004 for the IUCN Red List as vulnerable and not updated since.
