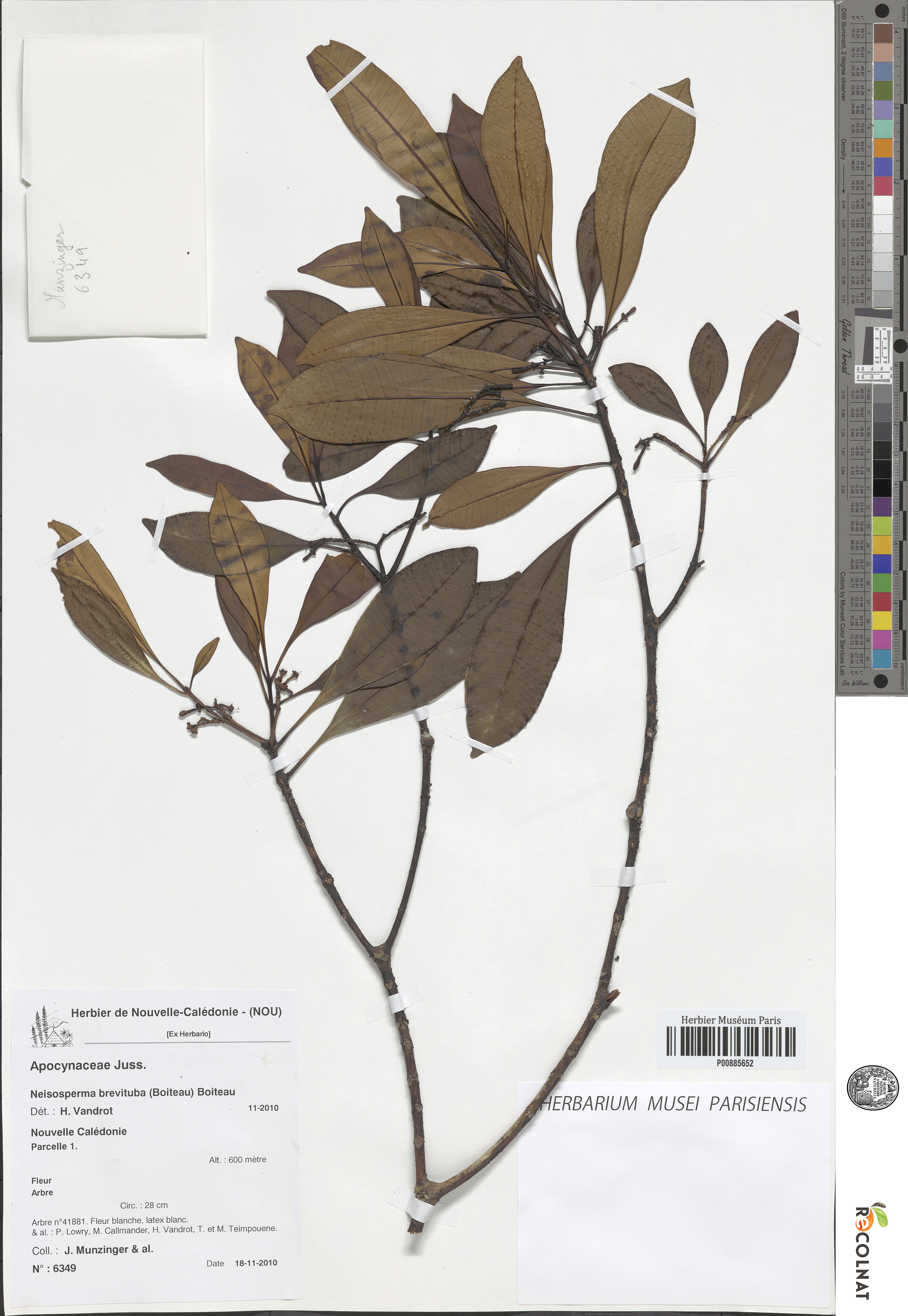

Conservation status
- Vulnerable (IUCN 2.3)

Scientific classification
- Kingdom: Plantae
- Clade: Tracheophytes
- Clade: Angiosperms
- Clade: Eudicots
- Clade: Asterids
- Order: Gentianales
- Family: Apocynaceae
- Genus: Ochrosia
- Species: O. brevituba

Binomial name
- Ochrosia brevituba Boiteau

Synonyms
- Calpicarpum brevitubum (Boiteau) Boiteau; Neisosperma brevitubum (Boiteau) Boiteau

= Ochrosia brevituba =

Species of plant

Ochrosia brevituba, synonym Neisosperma brevituba, is a species of plant in the family Apocynaceae. It is endemic to New Caledonia.
