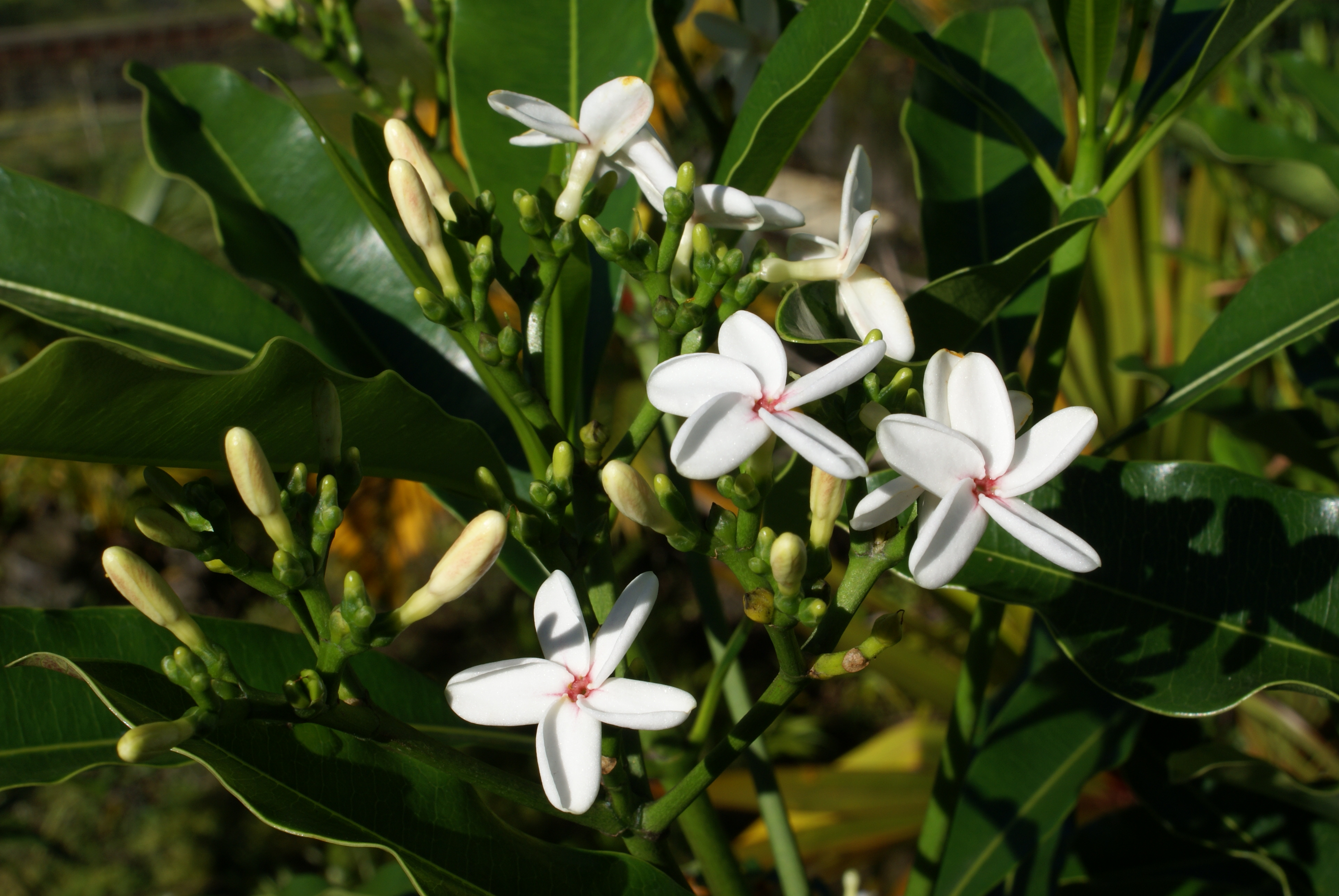
- Ochrosia borbonica

Scientific classification
- Kingdom: Plantae
- Clade: Embryophytes
- Clade: Tracheophytes
- Clade: Spermatophytes
- Clade: Angiosperms
- Clade: Eudicots
- Clade: Asterids
- Order: Gentianales
- Family: Apocynaceae
- Subfamily: Rauvolfioideae
- Tribe: Vinceae
- Subtribe: Ochrosiinae; Pichon ex Boiteau
- Genus: Ochrosia; Juss.

Synonyms
- Bleekeria Hassk. 1859 not Hassk. 1855; Calpicarpum G.Don; Diderota Comm. ex A.DC.; Excavatia Markgr.; Lactaria Rumph. ex Raf.; Neisosperma Raf.; Ochrosion St.-Lag.; Pseudochrosia Blume

= Ochrosia =

Genus of plants

Ochrosia is a genus of flowering plants, first described in 1789. It belongs to the family Apocynaceae, and is native to Southeast Asia, Australia, and various islands of the Indian and Pacific Oceans. The Greek word Ochrosia is a pale yellow and refer to the wood not the flowers.

== Species ==
Species in the genus include:

1. Ochrosia ackeringae (Teijsm. & Binn.) Miq. – Indonesia, Philippines, Papuasia, Christmas Island
2. Ochrosia acuminata Trimen ex Valeton – Sulawesi
3. Ochrosia alyxioides Guillaumin – Vanuatu
4. Ochrosia apoensis Elmer – Luzon, Mindanao
5. Ochrosia balansae (Guillaumin) Baill. ex Guillaumin – New Caledonia
6. Ochrosia basistamina Hendrian – Sulawesi
7. Ochrosia bodenheimarum Guillaumin – Vallée de la Toutouta in New Caledonia
8. Ochrosia borbonica J.F.Gmel. – Mauritius + Réunion; naturalized in Guangdong
9. Ochrosia brevituba Boiteau – New Caledonia
10. Ochrosia brownii (Fosberg & Sachet) Lorence & Butaud – Nuku Hiva in Marquesas (extinct in the wild)
11. Ochrosia citrodora K.Schum. & Lauterb. – New Guinea
12. Ochrosia coccinea (Teijsm. & Binn.) Miq. – Maluku, Sulawesi, New Guinea, Solomon Islands; naturalized in Guangdong
13. Ochrosia compta K.Schum., Hōlei – Hawaii (Maui, Oʻahu, Molokaʻi)
14. Ochrosia elliptica Labill. – Lord Howe Island, Queensland, New Caledonia, Vanuatu, Nauru; naturalized in Guangdong + Taiwan
15. Ochrosia fatuhivensis Fosberg & Sachet – Fatu Hiva in Marquesas but extinct
16. Ochrosia ficifolia (S.Moore) Markgr. – New Guinea
17. Ochrosia glomerata (Blume) F.Muell. – Borneo, Sulawesi, Philippines, Maluku, New Guinea, Solomon Islands
18. Ochrosia grandiflora Boit. – New Caledonia
19. Ochrosia haleakalae H.St.John, Hōlei – Maui + island of Hawaiʻi (so-called Big Island) in Hawaiian Islands
20. Ochrosia hexandra Koidz. – Kazan-retto ( = Volcano Islands of Japan)
21. Ochrosia inventorum L.Allorge – New Caledonia
22. Ochrosia iwasakiana (Koidz.) Koidz. ex Masam. ( = Ryukyu Islands of Japan)
23. Ochrosia kauaiensis H.St.John, Hōlei – Kauaʻi in Hawaiian Islands
24. †Ochrosia kilaueaensis H.St.John, Hōlei – island of Hawaiʻi (so-called Big Island) in Hawaiian Islands, but extinct
25. Ochrosia kilneri F.Muell. – Queensland
26. Ochrosia lifuana Guillaumin – Loyalty Islands + Isle of Pines in New Caledonia
27. Ochrosia mariannensis A.DC. – Mariana Islands
28. Ochrosia miana Baill. ex Guillaumin – New Caledonia
29. Ochrosia minima (Markgr.) Fosberg & Boiteau – Queensland, Papua New Guinea
30. Ochrosia moorei (F.Muell.) F.Muell. ex Benth. – Queensland, New South Wales
31. Ochrosia mulsantii Montrouz. – New Caledonia
32. Ochrosia nakaiana (Koidz.) Koidz. ex H.Hara – Ogasawara-shoto ( = Bonin Islands of Japan)
33. Ochrosia newelliana F.M.Bailey – Queensland
34. Ochrosia novocaledonica Däniker – New Caledonia
35. Ochrosia oppositifolia (Lam.) K.Schum. – Seychelles, Chagos Islands, Sri Lanka, Maldive Islands, Andaman & Nicobar Islands, Thailand, Vietnam, W Malaysia, Indonesia, Papuasia, Samoa, Tonga, Tuvalu, Vanuatu, Wallis & Futuna, French Polynesia, Line Islands, Micronesia
36. Ochrosia poweri F.M.Bailey – Queensland, New South Wales
37. Ochrosia sciadophylla Markgr – Bismarck Archipelago, Solomon Islands
38. Ochrosia sevenetii Boiteau – New Guinea
39. Ochrosia silvatica Däniker – New Caledonia
40. Ochrosia solomonensis (Merr. & L.M.Perry) Fosberg & Boiteau – Solomon Islands
41. Ochrosia syncarpa Markgr. – Bali, Lombok, Timor, Flores
42. Ochrosia tahitensis Laness. ex Pichon – Tahiti
43. Ochrosia tenimberensis Markgr. – Tanimbar Islands

=== Formerly included species ===
Species formerly included in the genus before being reclassified include:

1. Ochrosia nukuhivensis Fosberg & Sachet = Rauvolfia nukuhivensis (Fosberg & Sachet) Lorence & Butaud
2. Ochrosia sandwicensis A.DC. = Rauvolfia sandwicensis A.DC.
3. Ochrosia tuberculata (Vahl) Pichon = Rauvolfia sandwicensis A.DC.
