= Lucile Allorge =

Madagascar-born French botanist (1937–2023)

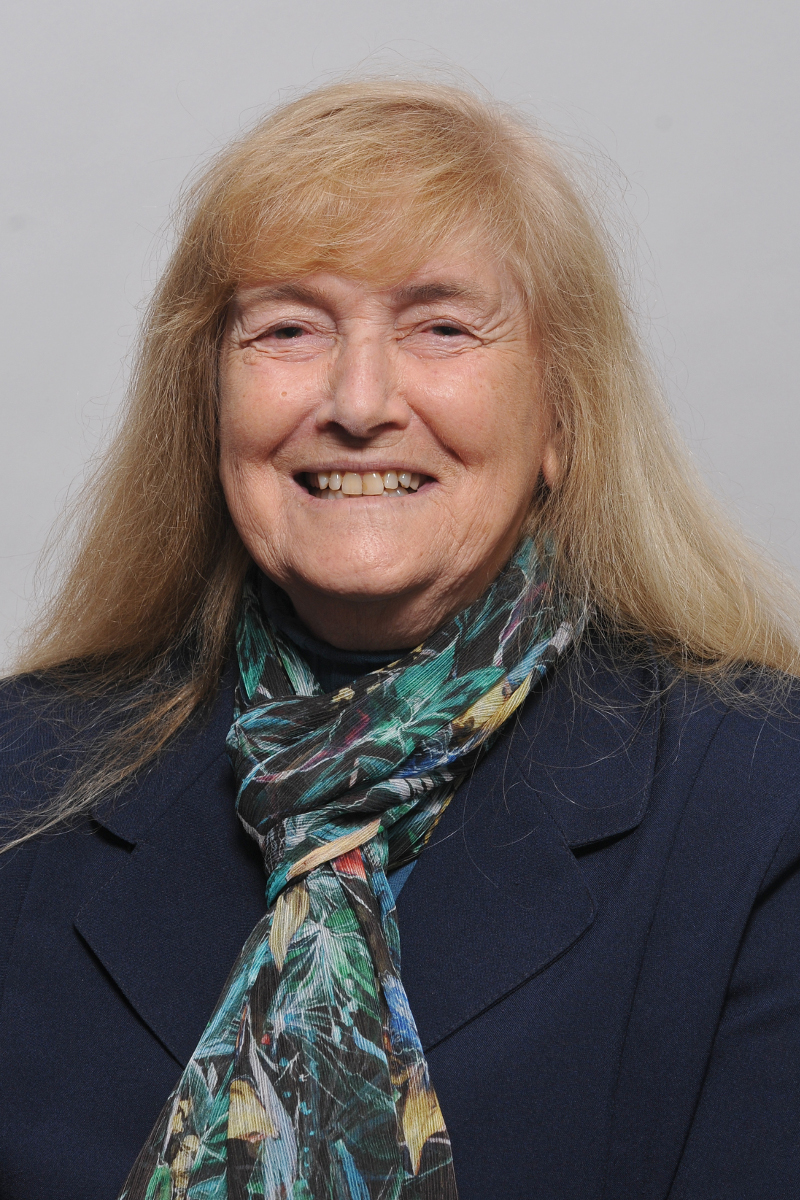
- Born: Lucile Boiteau; 25 October 1937; Antananarivo, Madagascar
- Died: 31 August 2023 (aged 85); Saint-Rémy-lès-Chevreuse, France
- Occupation: Botanist
- Father: Pierre Boiteau
- Awards: Prix de Coincy; Knight of the National Order of Merit of Madagascar
- Scientific career
- Institutions: CNRS
- Author abbrev. (botany): L.Allorge

Lucile Allorge (née Boiteau; 25 October 1937 – 29 August 2023) was a Madagascar-born French botanist.

== Biography ==
Lucile Boiteau was born in Antananarivo, Madagascar, on 25 October 1937. Her father, Pierre Boiteau, was the founder and director of the Botanical and Zoological Garden of Tsimbazaza. Allorge held a doctorate in botanical sciences.

Allorge was a member of many learned societies, including the Société botanique de France where she won the 2011 Prix de Coincy.

In 1968, she joined the French National Centre for Scientific Research (CNRS). An honorary attaché at the National Museum of Natural History, France (MNHN), she had carried out numerous missions in French Guiana, Madagascar, the Philippines, Venezuela and Malaysia. Allorge had published more than 100 scientific articles. She had been named Knight of the National Order of Merit of Madagascar. In 2007, she was elected to the Académie des sciences d'outre-mer as a corresponding member of the 4th section. She was a member of the Société des explorateurs français.

Allorge died on 29 August 2023, at the age of 85.

== Eponymy ==
- Liliaceae Aloe lucile-allorgeae Rauh
- Crassulaceae Kalanchoe lucile-allorgei Rauh & Mangeldorf
- Buthidae Tityobuthus lucileae

== Awards and honours ==
- Prix de Coincy, 2011
- Knight of the National Order of Merit of Madagascar

== Selected works ==
- Lucile Allorge, Plantes de Madagascar : atlas. Plaissan : MUSEO (1st ed. 2008), 2017 ISBN 978-2-37375-025-6, 2-37375-025-2
- Lucile Allorge (collaborator), Je sais utiliser mes huiles essentielles. Paris : Rue de l’échiquier, 2016
- Collective work under the direction of Lucile Allorge and Thomas Haevermans, Namoroka : mission à Madagascar. Toulouse : Privat; Paris : Muséum National d'Histoire Naturelle, 2015
- Yves Delange, Yves-Marie Allain, Françoise-Hélène Jourda, Lucile Allorge, Les serres : le génie architectural au service des plantes. Arles : Actes Sud, 2013.
- Régine Rosenthal, Lucile Allorge, Jean-Noël Burte, Christian Messier, Origines : les forêts primaires dans le monde. Toulouse : Éditions Privat, 2012
- Lucile Allorge-Boiteau and Maxime Allorge, Faune et flore de Madagascar. Paris : Karthala, 2011
- Lucile Allorge-Boiteau, Régine Rosenthal, Madagascar : l'Eden fragile : biodiversité. Toulouse : Éditions Privat, 2010
- Lucile Allorge, Plantes de Madagascar : atlas. Paris : Ulmer, 2008
- Lucile Allorge, La fabuleuse odyssée des plantes : les botanistes voyageurs, les jardins des plantes, les herbiers. Paris : JC Lattès, 2003 (prix Émile Gallé)
- Suzanne Mollet and Lucile Allorge, Histoire du Parc Botanique et Zoologique de Tsimbazaza Éditions Alzieu, Grenoble, 2000
- Pierre Boiteau, Marthe Boiteau and Lucile Allorge, Dictionnaire des noms malgaches des végétaux Éditions Alzieu. Grenoble. 1999
- Pierre Boiteau, Lucile Allorge-Boiteau, Kalanchoe (Crassulacées) de Madagascar : systématique, écophysiologie et phytochimie. Paris : Karthala, 1995
- Pierre Boiteau and Lucile Allorge-Boiteau, Plantes médicinales de Madagascar. Paris : Karthala, 1993
- Scientific direction of the republication of l'illustration des genres by Jean-Baptiste Lamarck, 1000 plates, 10 volumes. Paris : Éditions Amarca, 1989. Translation into Spanish by Liber Ediciones, 1995.
- Lucile Allorge, Monographie des Apocynacées - Tabernaemontanoïdées américaines. Muséum national d'Histoire naturelle, Paris, (Mémoires du Muséum national d'Histoire naturelle, Sér. B – Botanique (1950-1992); 30). 1985.

== Exhibitions ==
- Botanical passions: naturalists travelers at the time of the great discoveries: exhibition, Ploézal, Domaine départemental de la Roche Jagu, 7 June-9 November 2008. Rennes: Ouest-France, 2008

== Filmography ==
- Sur la piste de Wallace, expedition to the Philippines in January 2000 under the direction of Patrice Franceschi. DVD.
- Les sortilèges de l’île rouge Madagascar, Ankarana, in November 2001, director Alain Tixier, Ushuaïa Nicolas Hulot, DVD.
- Le labyrinthe secret de Namoroka, directors Jean-Michel Corillion and Isabelle Coulon
