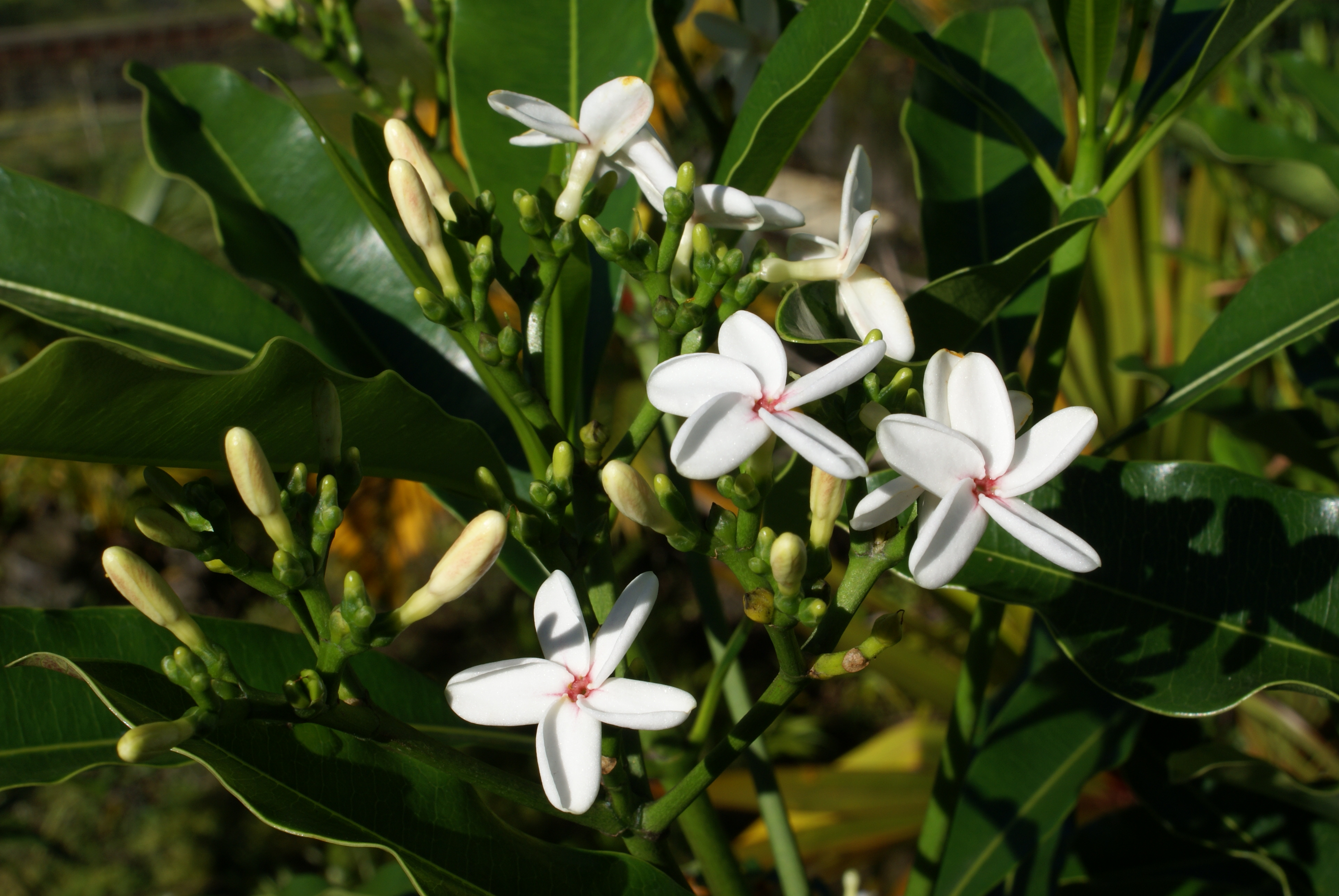

Conservation status
- Endangered (IUCN 2.3)

Scientific classification
- Kingdom: Plantae
- Clade: Tracheophytes
- Clade: Angiosperms
- Clade: Eudicots
- Clade: Asterids
- Order: Gentianales
- Family: Apocynaceae
- Genus: Ochrosia
- Species: O. borbonica

Binomial name
- Ochrosia borbonica J.F.Gmel.

= Ochrosia borbonica =

Species of plant

Ochrosia borbonica is a species of plant in the family Apocynaceae. It is native to Mauritius and Réunion, and naturalized in Guangdong Province in China.

The species is listed as endangered.
