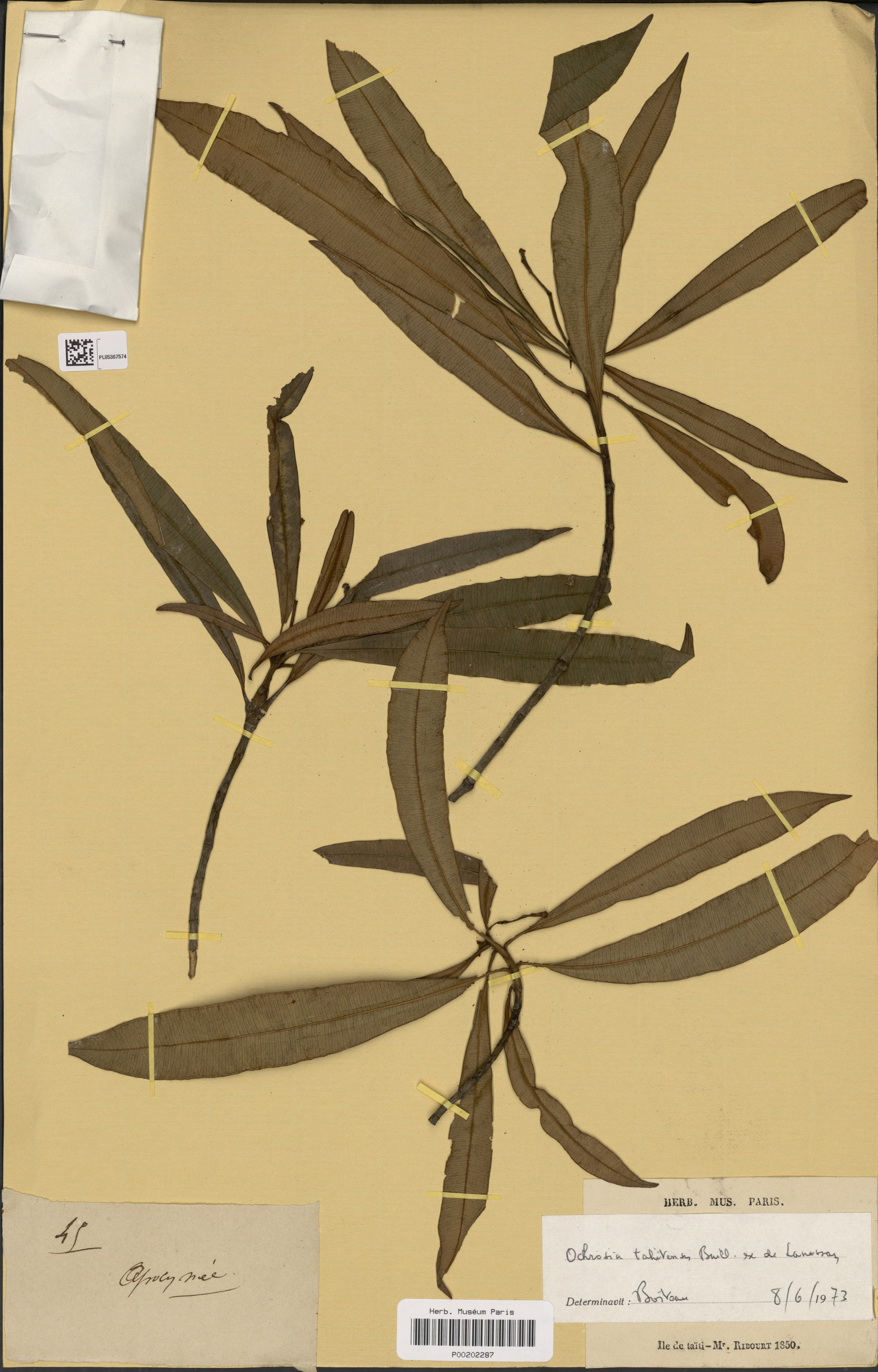
- Specimen collected in 1850

Conservation status
- Critically Endangered (IUCN 3.1)

Scientific classification
- Kingdom: Plantae
- Clade: Tracheophytes
- Clade: Angiosperms
- Clade: Eudicots
- Clade: Asterids
- Order: Gentianales
- Family: Apocynaceae
- Genus: Ochrosia
- Species: O. tahitensis

Binomial name
- Ochrosia tahitensis Lanessan ex Pichon (1947)

= Ochrosia tahitensis =

Species of plant

Ochrosia tahitensis is a species of plant in the family Apocynaceae. It is endemic to Tahiti of the Society Islands, in French Polynesia.
