= Franck Vogel =

French photographer, journalist, documentary film director, and speaker

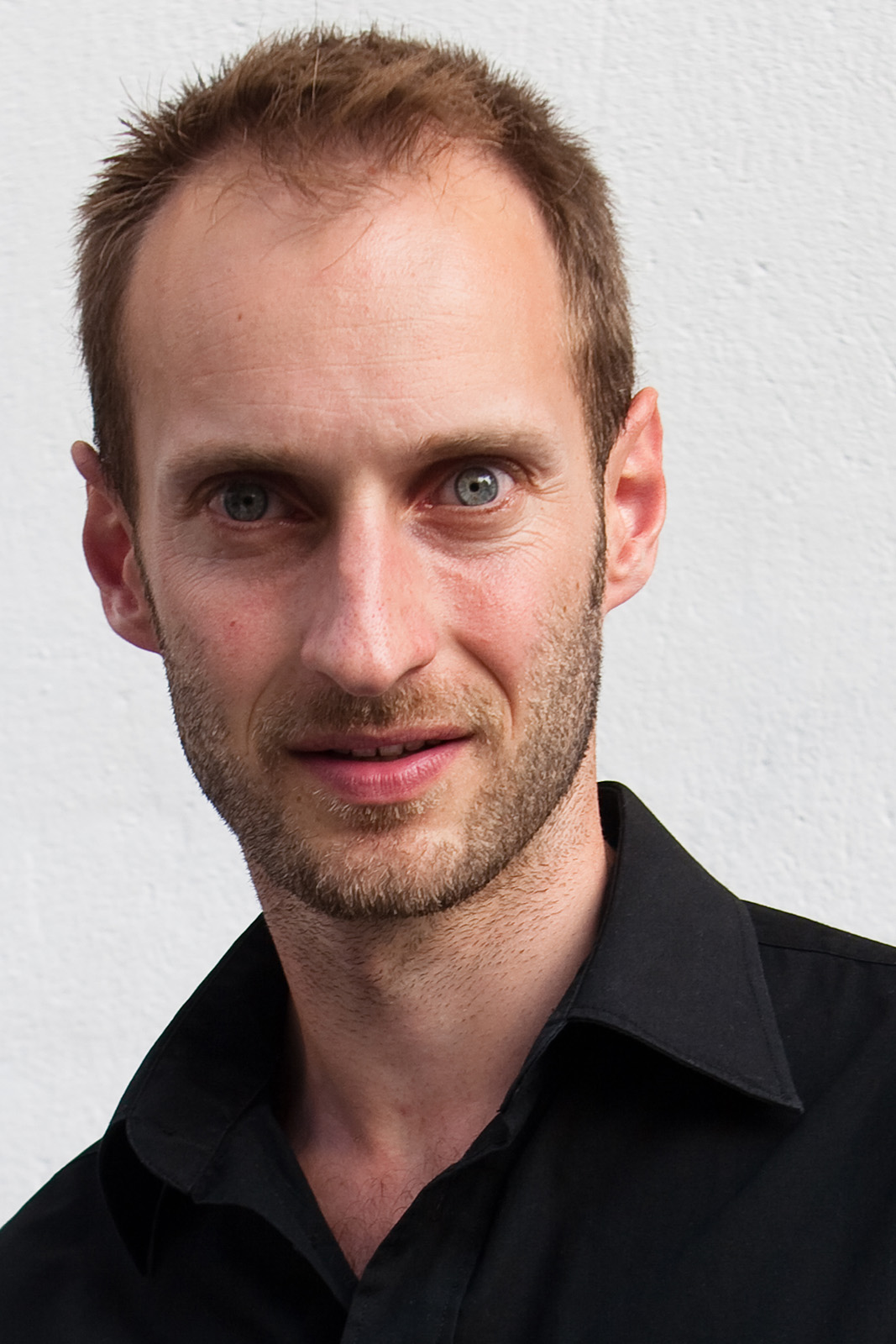
- Born: 1977 (age 48–49); Strasbourg, France
- Occupations: Photojournalist specializing in social & environmental issues
- Known for: Bishnoi, Transboundary Rivers
- Website: https://www.franckvogel.com

Franck Vogel (born 1977 in Strasbourg, France) is a French photographer specializing in social & environmental issues, journalist, speaker and documentary film director. He lives and works in Paris.

== Life and work ==
Vogel studied biochemistry at Louis Pasteur University in Strasbourg, France, and at Lehigh University in Pennsylvania, USA; and engineering at AgroParisTech, attaining a master's degree in 2001

During 2002 he hitchhiked in Africa and Asia and took up photography in 2003.

Vogel is known for his stories on environmental issues (The Bishnois: ecologists since the 15th century), social (Albinos: Massacre in Tanzania), ethnological (Vlachs of the Balkans, the most discreet community in the Balkans) and geopolitics (a long term project on some transboundary rivers experiencing tension due to water access including the Nile, the Brahmaputra, the Colorado River, the Jordan, the Mekong, the Ganges, the Zambezi and the Danube River). The New York Times talks about his "striking black-and-white portraits of albino people in Tanzania". He was interviewed by BBC News on his rivers' project while visiting Singapore for his exhibit at Gardens by the Bay, and gave talks at Columbia University with the Earth Institute both on the Bishnois and on the Transboundary rivers' project. La Martinière, a French publishing house, released in Sept 2016 the 1st volume Fleuves Frontières (Transboundary Rivers: Will war for water happen?), and in the meantime an exhibition on the Colorado River is presented in Paris at the Pavillon de l'eau.

His work has been published in GEO magazine, Stern, Paris Match, NRC Weekblad, Animan, Le Monde diplomatique. He has had exhibitions in two Parisian Metro stations (Montparnasse and Luxembourg), in Mehrangarh Fort in Jodhpur in India, Photokina in Germany, in Yangon in Burma, in Dali in China, in Kazakhstan (Astana and Almaty), in Turkey (Istanbul), in Italy (Natural History Museum in Verona), in Germany (Horizonte Zingst).

Vogel wrote and co-directed a documentary film The Bishnois: India's eco-warriors (Rajasthan, l'âme d'un prophète) (52 min, France 5, 2011). The film was awarded the Phoenix d'Or 2011 and the Terre Sauvage Award 2013. Télérama magazine wrote of it, that "If everyone could watch this documentary, the Earth would be better off". In October 2013, he received the highest recognition by the Bishnoi community to spread the Bishnoi philosophy.

He is member of the Société des explorateurs français (French Explorers’ Society) and an ambassador for Green Cross, Mikhaïl Gorbatchev's environmental NGO.
