= Ochrosia kilaueaensis =

Conservation status
- Extinct (IUCN 3.1)

Scientific classification
- Kingdom: Plantae
- Clade: Tracheophytes
- Clade: Angiosperms
- Clade: Eudicots
- Clade: Asterids
- Order: Gentianales
- Family: Apocynaceae
- Genus: Ochrosia
- Species: †O. kilaueaensis

Binomial name
- †Ochrosia kilaueaensis H.St.John

Species of plant

Ochrosia kilaueaensis is an extinct species of flowering plant in the genus Ochrosia in Apocynaceae. Its common names include holei and Hawaii yellowwood. It was endemic to the island of Hawaiʻi. It has been collected only at Puuwaawaa and Kipuka Puaulu and has not been seen since the 1940s.
