= Société des explorateurs français =

The Société des explorateurs français (SEF) (Society of French Explorers) is a non-profit organisation, located inside the Société de Géographie in Paris, dedicated to the promotion of exploration, scientific research, and geographical discovery. Until 1999, it was known as the Société des explorateurs et voyageurs français and sometimes also Club des explorateurs.

== History ==
Henri Lauga, editor-in-chief of Le Risque magazine writes the idea of a similar The Explorers Club in France in the second issue of the magazine. On 30 of June 1937, a group of explorers gather and decide to create the club. The founding committee files the articles of the association in August 1937. The number of members is limited to 300 and in May 2026, it counts around 250 members and 475 past members. From the start the SEF included female personalities and French speaking explorers from other countries as Ella Maillart was Swiss.

== Activities ==
The main objective of the organisation is to make the world of exploration meet the general public; the SEF's members give many conferences per year in Paris. The organisation is often consulted by the media to get a specialist to speak about certain discoveries.

The SEF and its members are often present or partnering with adventure film festivals in France. The SEF organises as well each year since 2016 the LUMEXPLORE film festival for exploration, science and the environment. The festival has a competition initiative allowing young people to submit a 5-minute film about science that will be screened at the festival.

The SEF with some sponsors do give every year a few grants for promising scientific expeditions.

The SEF organises the Liotard Prize, which is presented by the President of the French Republic.

== List of Presidents ==
- 1937-1938: Louis Audouin-Dubreuil
- 1939-1945: Jean-Baptiste (Marie Emmanuel) Budes de Guébriant
- 1946-1946: Bertrand Flornoy
- 1947-1948: Paul-Émile Victor
- 1948-1952: Bertrand Flornoy
- 1953-1953: François Balsan
- 1954-1955: Paul-Émile Victor
- 1956-1980: Bertrand Flornoy
- 1980-1984: Georges Laclavère
- 1984 (March to June): Jean Dorst
- 1984-1989: Jacques Villeminot
- 1989-1991: Alice Saunier-Seité
- 1991-1995: Bernard Pierre
- 1995-2002: Claude Collin-Delavaud
- 2002-2006: Patrice Franceschi
- since 2006: Olivier Archambeau

== Members ==
=== Founding members ===
- Chairman: Louis Audouin-Dubreuil.
- Vice-chairman: Bernard de Colmont.
- Secretaries: Gabrielle Bertrand (explorer) and Henri Lauga.
- Jean-Marie Conty, Paul Coze, Bertrand Flornoy, Robert Gessain, Ella Maillart, Fred Matter, Théodore Monod, André Parrot, Michel Perez, Edgard Roland-Michel, Jo Tourte, Roger Tourte, Paul-Émile Victor.

=== Honorary members ===
- Astronauts: Jean-Loup Chrétien, Claudie Haigneré, Jean-Pierre Haigneré, Thomas Pesquet, Michel Tognini.
- Adventurers, sailors, alpinists: Isabelle Autissier, Jean-Louis Étienne, Patrice Franceschi, Mike Horn, Pierre Mazeaud, Bertrand Piccard.
- Writers, media personalities: Nicolas Hulot, Lili le Gall, Sylvain Tesson.
- Scientists: Gilles Boeuf, Francis Hallé, Augusto Ruschi, Philippe Taquet.

=== Notable members ===
==== Current ====
- Astronauts: Jean-François Clervoy.
- Adventurers, sailors: Fabrice Amedeo, Philippe Croizon, Raphaël Domjan, Charles Hedrich, Louis-Philippe Loncke.
- Writers, media personalities, museum directors: Élodie Bernard, Sylvie Brunel, Robert Calcagno, Reza Deghati, Gérard Feldzer, Antoine de Maximy, Pierre de Vallombreuse, Franck Vogel, Olivier Weber.
- Scientists, architects: Merieme Chadid, Jean-Pierre Houdin, Laïla Nehmé, Jacques Rougerie.

==== Past ====
- Astronauts: Patrick Baudry, Philippe Perrin.
- Adventurers, sailors, aviators, alpinists, speleologists: Gérard d'Aboville, Maurice Bellonte, Éric de Bisschop, Alain Bombard, Norbert Casteret, Benoît Chamoux, Francis de Noyelle, Maud Fontenoy, Alain Gheerbrant, Maurice Herzog, Thor Heyerdahl, Georges Houot, Louis Lachenal, Loïc Leferme, Leopold III of Belgium, Raymond Maufrais, Bernard Moitessier, Michel Siffre, Will Steger, Éric Tabarly, Lionel Terray, André Turcat.
- Writers, photographers, directors and media personalities: Serge Bourguignon, Georges de Caunes, Jacques-Yves Cousteau, Alexandra David-Néel, Jean-François Deniau, Philippe Diolé, Pierre-Dominique Gaisseau, Marc Garanger, Bernard Giraudeau, Guy de Larigaudie, André Migot, Antoine (singer), Jean Raspail, Louise Weiss.
- Scientists, architects: Lucile Allorge, Michel Brunet, Yves Coppens, René-Yves Creston, Audouin Dollfus, Jean Dorst, Guillaume Grandidier, Jean Guiart, Roger Heim, Alphonse Juin, Katia Krafft, Maurice Krafft, Annette Laming-Emperaire, Jean Leclant, André Leroi-Gourhan, Claude Lorius, Jean-Pierre Luminet, Henry de Lumley, Henri Marchal, Jacques Millot, Renaud Paulian, Martin Pickford, Georges-Henri Rivière, Jean Rouch, Robert Sténuit, Jean-Didier Vincent.
