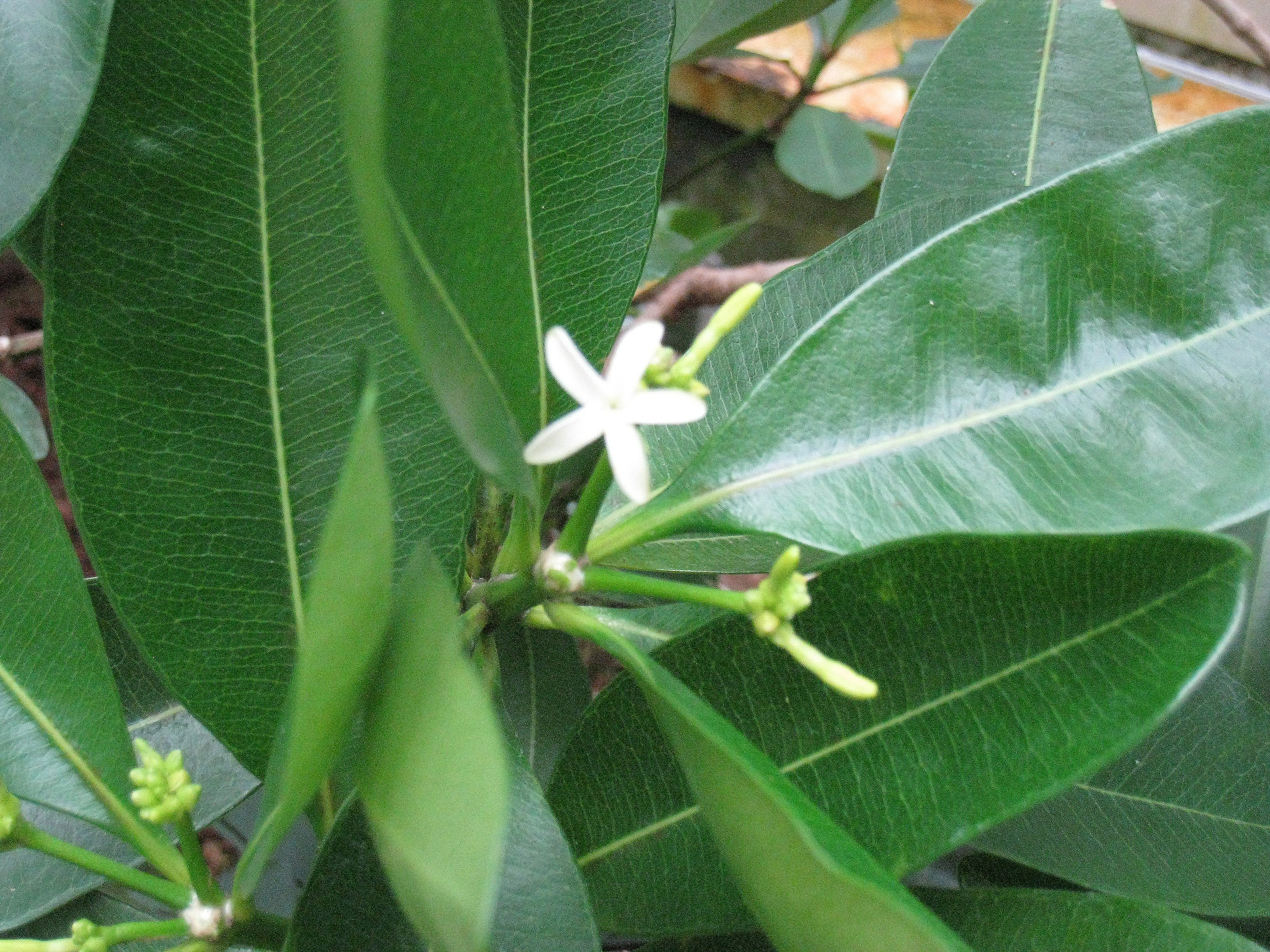

Scientific classification
- Kingdom: Plantae
- Clade: Tracheophytes
- Clade: Angiosperms
- Clade: Eudicots
- Clade: Asterids
- Order: Gentianales
- Family: Apocynaceae
- Genus: Ochrosia
- Species: O. ackeringae

Binomial name
- Ochrosia ackeringae (Teijsm. & Binn.) Miq. (1869)

= Ochrosia ackeringae =

Species of plant

Ochrosia ackeringae is a species of flowering plant in the family Apocynaceae that is found in the Malesian region in coastal rainforest or strand vegetation. The specific epithet honours the collector of one of the syntypes.

== Description ==
Ochrosia ackeringae is a small tree growing to 15 m in height, with a trunk diameter of up to 200 mm. The leaves are elliptic, entire, 60–150 mm long and 15–35 mm wide. The flowers are white and fragrant, with the corolla tube about 10 mm long. The fragrant yellow fruits are V-shaped, with the carpels united at the base, about 30 mm long and 10 mm wide.

== Distribution and habitat ==
The tree occurs throughout Malesia, including the Australian territory of Christmas Island, in coastal rainforest or strand vegetation.

== Sources ==
- "Ochrosia ackeringae (Teijsm. & Binn.) Miq". Flora of Australia Online. Australian Biological Resources Study. 1993.
