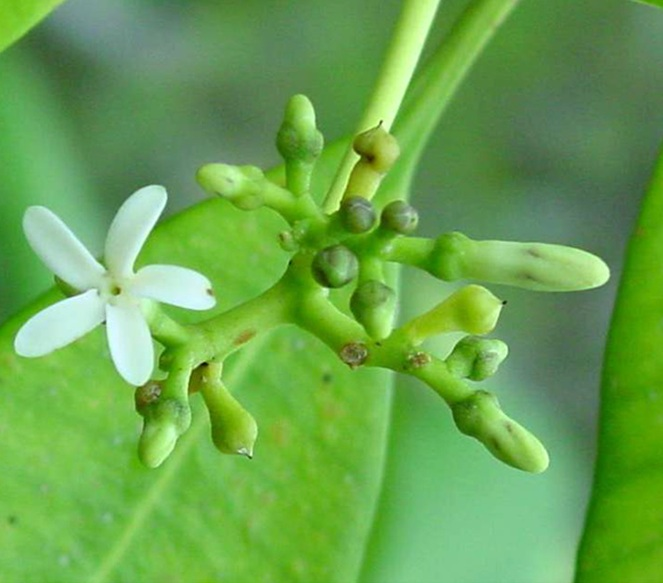

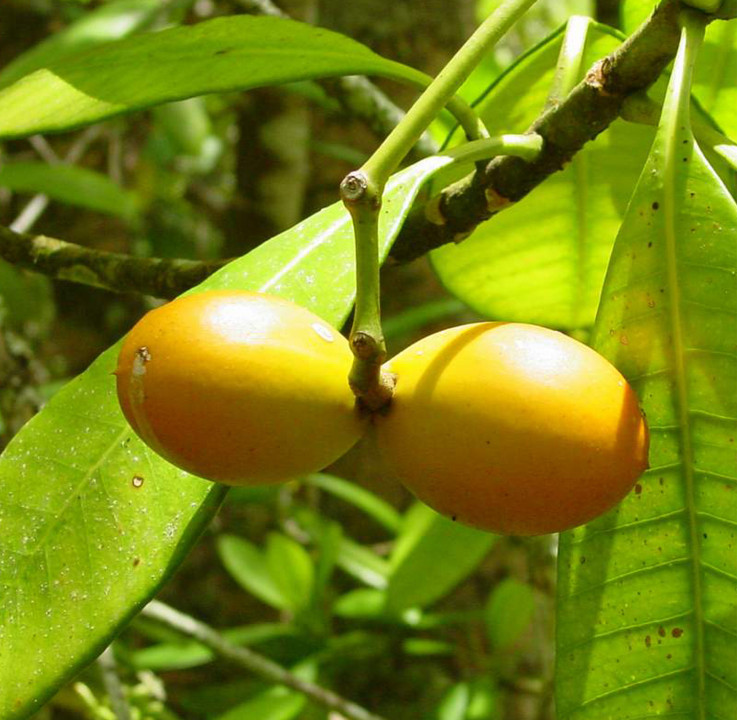
- Fruit of Ochrosia brownii

Conservation status
- Extinct in the Wild (IUCN 2.3)

Scientific classification
- Kingdom: Plantae
- Clade: Tracheophytes
- Clade: Angiosperms
- Clade: Eudicots
- Clade: Asterids
- Order: Gentianales
- Family: Apocynaceae
- Genus: Ochrosia
- Species: O. brownii

Binomial name
- Ochrosia brownii (Fosberg & Sachet) Lorence & Butaud

Synonyms
- Neisosperma brownii Fosberg & Sachet

= Ochrosia brownii =

Species of plant

Ochrosia brownii, synonym Neisosperma brownii, is a species of plant in the family Apocynaceae. It was endemic to the Marquesas Islands in French Polynesia and is extinct in the wild.
