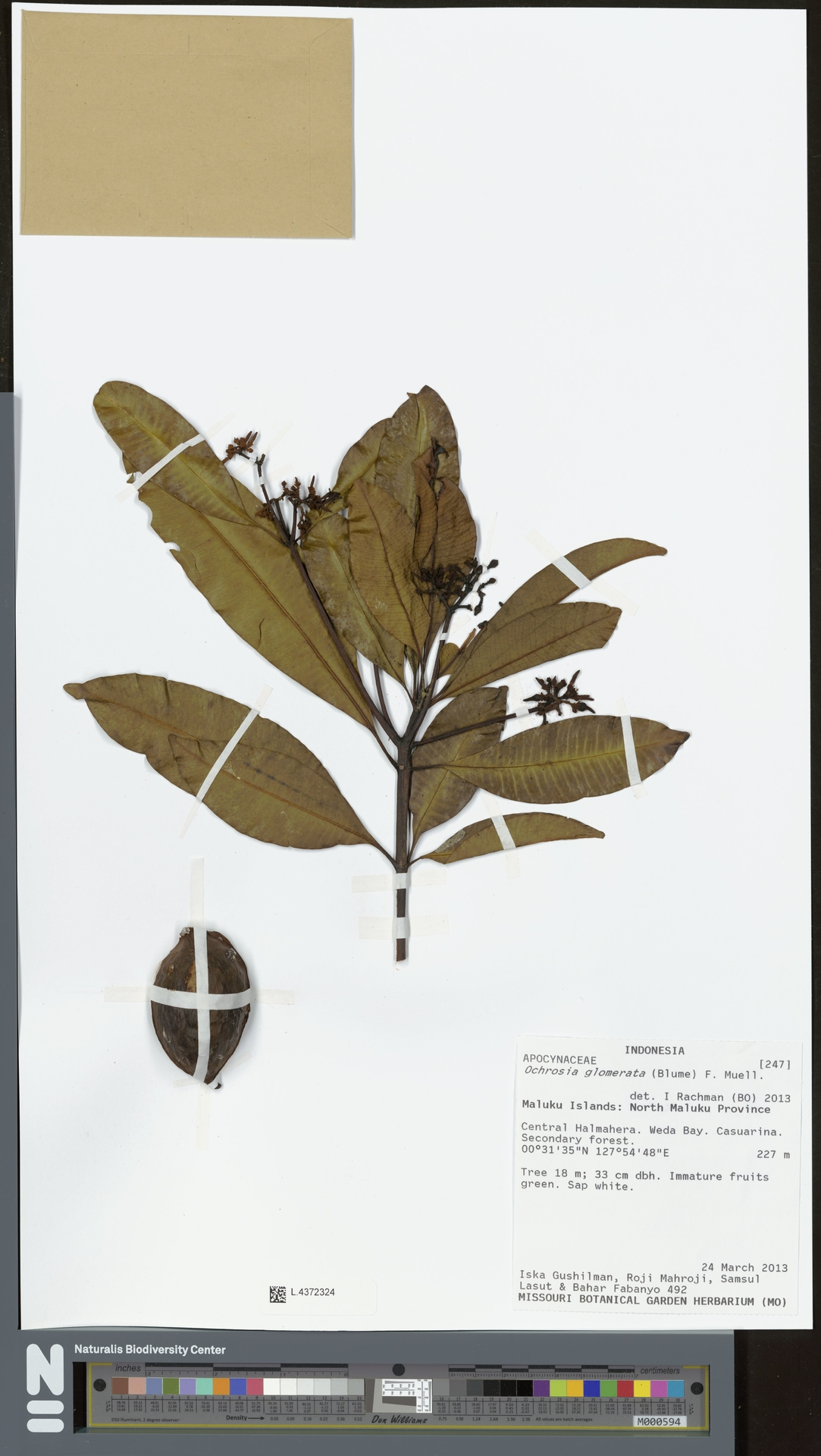

Conservation status
- Least Concern (IUCN 3.1)

Scientific classification
- Kingdom: Plantae
- Clade: Tracheophytes
- Clade: Angiosperms
- Clade: Eudicots
- Clade: Asterids
- Order: Gentianales
- Family: Apocynaceae
- Genus: Ochrosia
- Species: O. glomerata

Binomial name
- Ochrosia glomerata (Blume) F.Muell.

Synonyms
- Cerbera glomerata Zipp. ex Blume; Lactaria glomerata (Blume) Koidz.; Neisosperma glomeratum (Blume) Fosberg & Sachet; Pseudochrosia glomerata Blume

= Ochrosia glomerata =

Species of plant

Ochrosia glomerata is a species of tree in the family Apocynaceae.

== Description ==
Ochrosia glomerata grows as a tree up to 30 metres (100 ft) tall, with a trunk diameter of up to 30 centimetres (12 in). The bark is pale greyish brown to blackish brown. Inflorescences bear up to four fragrant flowers. The flowers feature a white corolla.

== Distribution and habitat ==
Ochrosia glomerata is native to Borneo, the Philippines, islands of eastern Indonesia, New Guinea and the Solomon Islands. Its habitat is primary and secondary forests from sea-level to 900 metres (3,000 ft) altitude.
