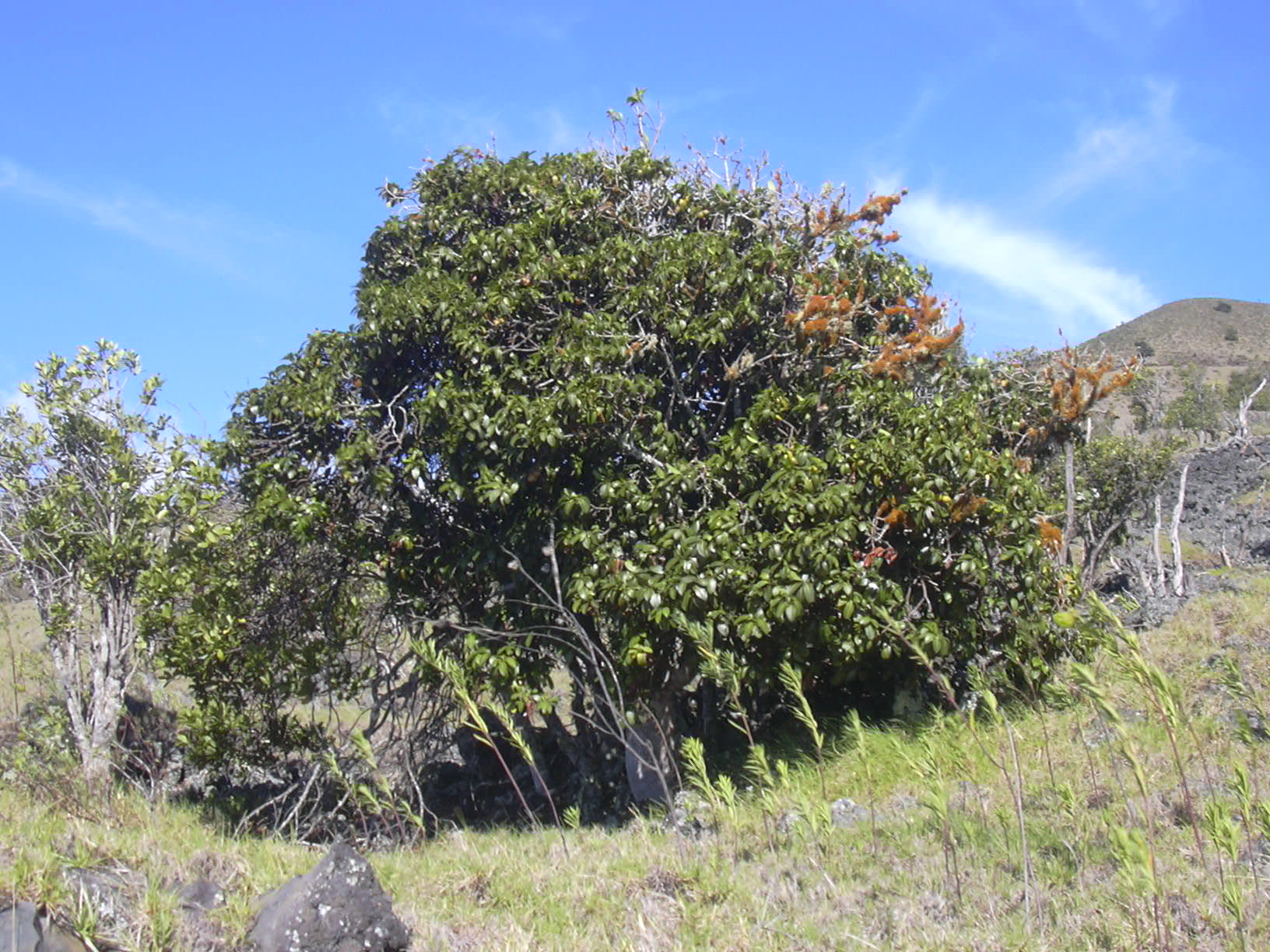

Conservation status
- Endangered (IUCN 2.3)

Scientific classification
- Kingdom: Plantae
- Clade: Tracheophytes
- Clade: Angiosperms
- Clade: Eudicots
- Clade: Asterids
- Order: Gentianales
- Family: Apocynaceae
- Genus: Ochrosia
- Species: O. haleakalae

Binomial name
- Ochrosia haleakalae St. John

= Ochrosia haleakalae =

Species of plant

Ochrosia haleakalae, the island yellowwood or hōlei, is a species of plant in the family Apocynaceae that is endemic to Hawaiʻi. It is threatened by habitat loss.

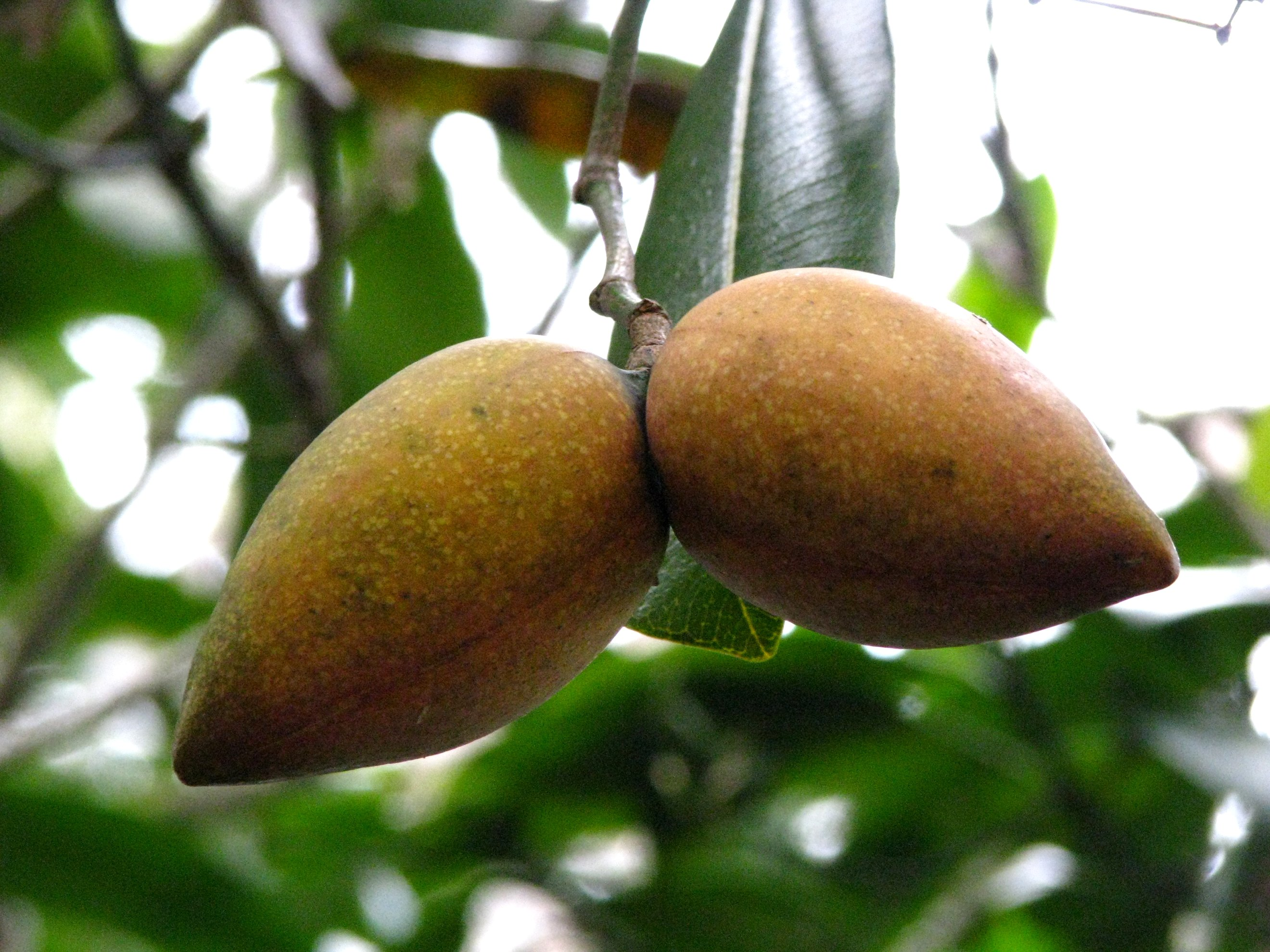
Nuts of Ochrosia haleakalae
