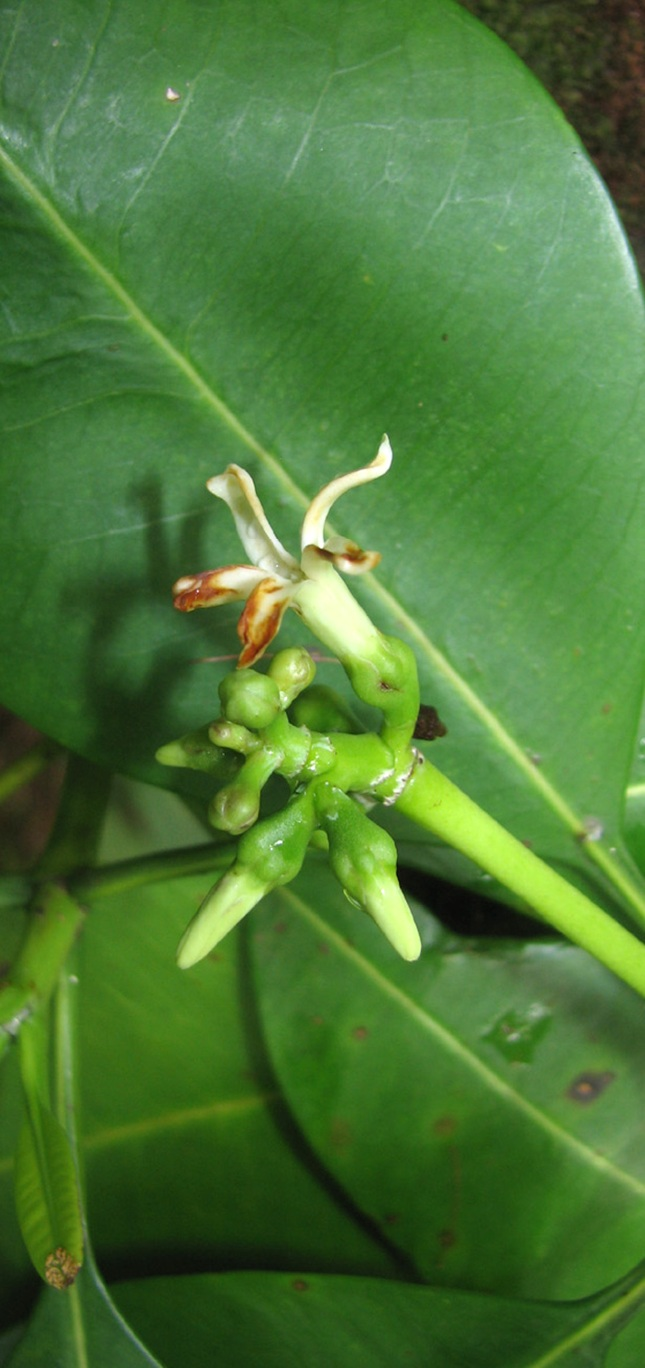

Conservation status
- Critically Endangered (IUCN 3.1)

Scientific classification
- Kingdom: Plantae
- Clade: Tracheophytes
- Clade: Angiosperms
- Clade: Eudicots
- Clade: Asterids
- Order: Gentianales
- Family: Apocynaceae
- Genus: Ochrosia
- Species: O. fatuhivensis

Binomial name
- Ochrosia fatuhivensis Fosberg & Sachet (1972)

= Ochrosia fatuhivensis =

Species of plant

Ochrosia fatuhivensis is a species of plant in the family Apocynaceae. It is endemic to Fatu Hiva in Marquesas Islands of French Polynesia.
