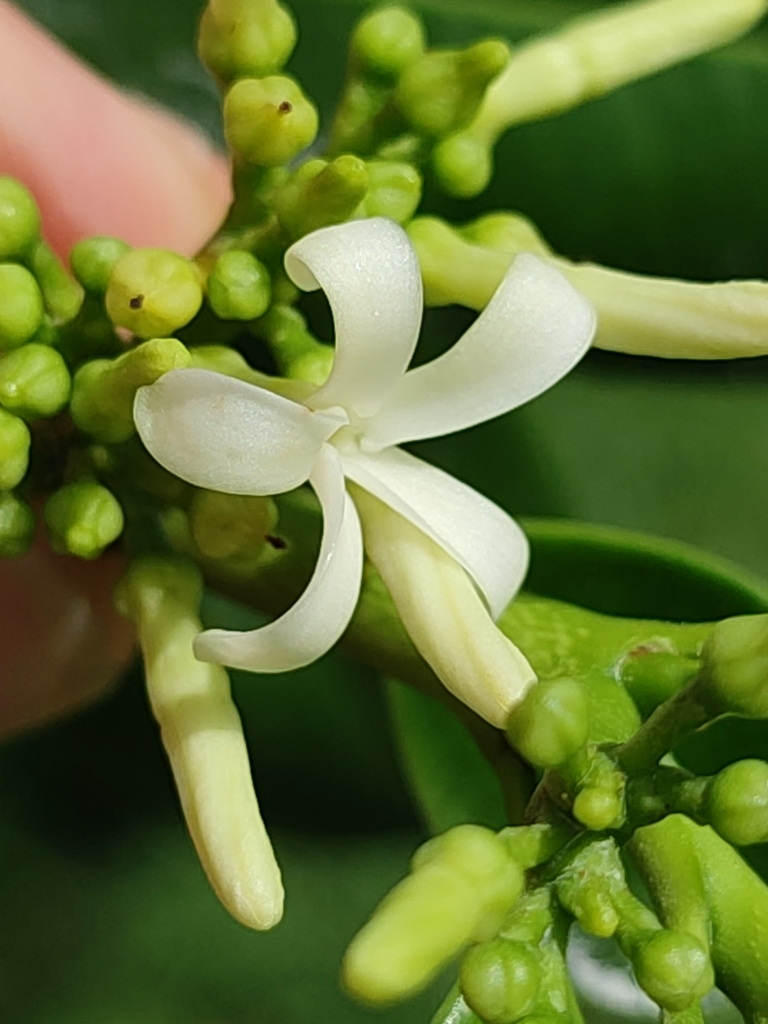

Conservation status
- Least Concern (IUCN 3.1)

Scientific classification
- Kingdom: Plantae
- Clade: Tracheophytes
- Clade: Angiosperms
- Clade: Eudicots
- Clade: Asterids
- Order: Gentianales
- Family: Apocynaceae
- Genus: Ochrosia
- Species: O. oppositifolia

Binomial name
- Ochrosia oppositifolia (Lam.) K.Schum

Synonyms
- List: Calpicarpum oppositifolium (Lam.) Boiteau; Cerbera oppositifolia Lam.; Kopsia lamarckii G.Don ex DC.; Lactaria oppositifolia (Lam.) Kuntze; Neisosperma oppositifolium (Lam.) Fosberg & Sachet; Cerbera muricata Lam.; Cerbera parviflora G.Forst.; Cerbera platyspermos Gaertn.; Ochrosia commutata K.Schum.; Ochrosia cowleyi F.M.Bailey; Ochrosia parviflora (G.Forst.) Hensl.; Ochrosia platyspermos (Gaertn.) A.DC.

= Ochrosia oppositifolia =

Species of flowering plant

Ochrosia oppositifolia, known commonly as twin-apple, is a species of flowering plant in the family Apocynaceae. It can be found in coastal forests ranging from the Seychelles to the Austral Islands of French Polynesia.

== Taxonomy ==
The species was first described in 1783 by Jean-Baptiste Lamarck, who placed the species in the genus Cerbera. It was first placed in Ochrosia – under the synonym Ochrosia commutata – by Karl Moritz Schumann in 1895. The generic name Ochrosia is taken from Greek, meaning 'pale-yellow', in reference to the colour of the species' flowers. The specific name oppositifolia is derived from Latin, referring to the species' leaves being arranged in a whorl, sticking out on opposite sides of the stem to one another.

== Description ==
Ochrosia oppositifolia is a tall tree, growing up to 60 m (200 ft) in height. Leaves are spoon-shaped, measure 6.5–36 cm (2.6–14.2 in) in length and 3.4–18 cm (1.3–7.1 in) wide and come whorled in groups of 3–5. Its flowers come in clusters, are white to cream or off-white and are pollinated by insects. The fruits are oval to elliptic, occasionally almost round, contain a single seed, and start out green and then turn yellow to orange or golden as they ripen. When damaged, the tree secretes a milky white latex.

== Distribution and habitat ==
The species is found primarily in the wet tropical biome, near the equator, with a range centered on eastern China and Southeast Asia that stretches as far west as the Seychelles and as far east as the Austral Islands of French Polynesia. The species widespread distribution and lack of threats led it to be listed as a least-concern species by its 2021 IUCN Red List assessment.

It is found in primary and old secondary coastal forest, often in limestone areas, and is also found on hill slopes, river margins and in swamps.

== Gallery ==
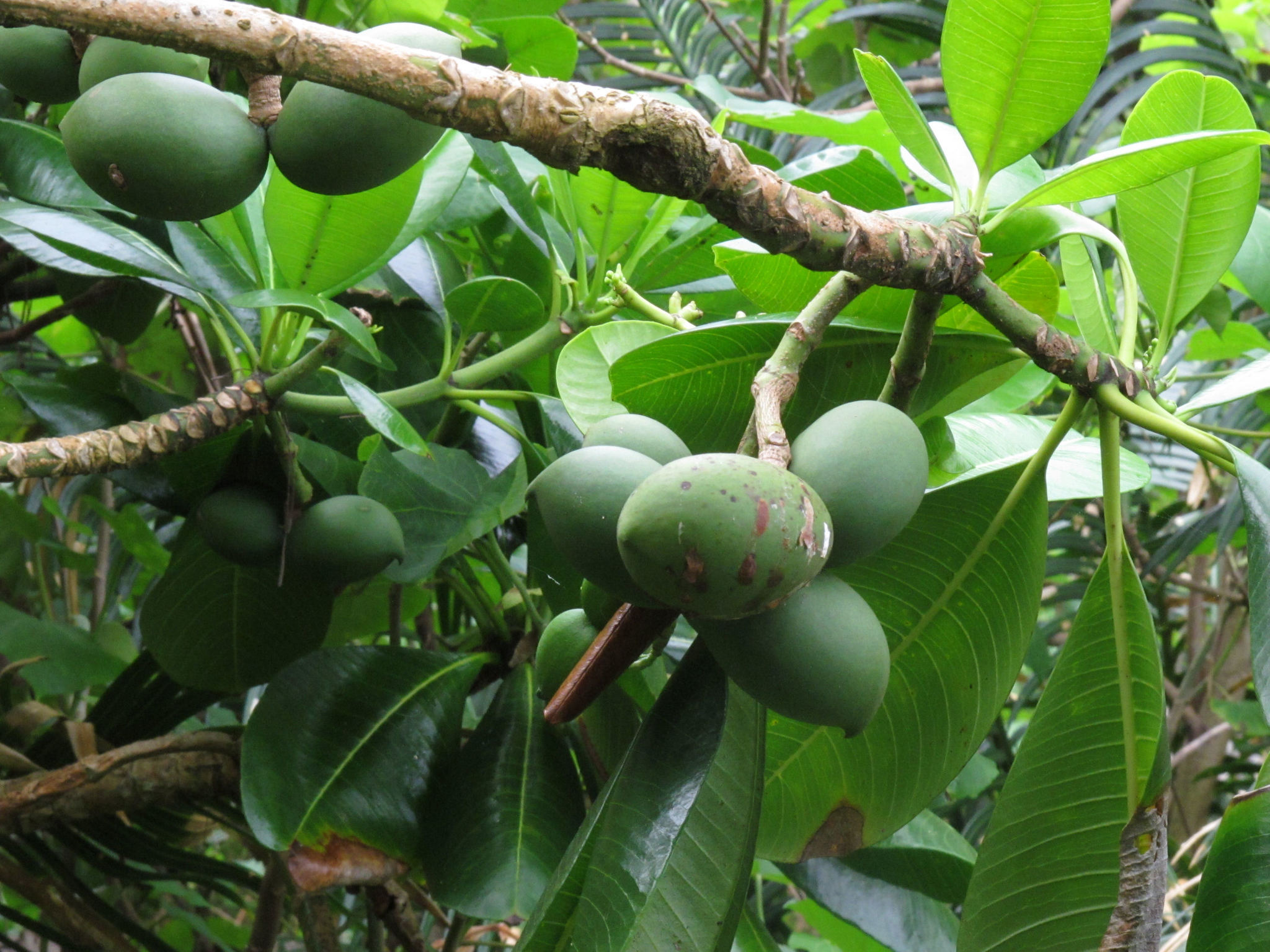
Fruits. Tonga

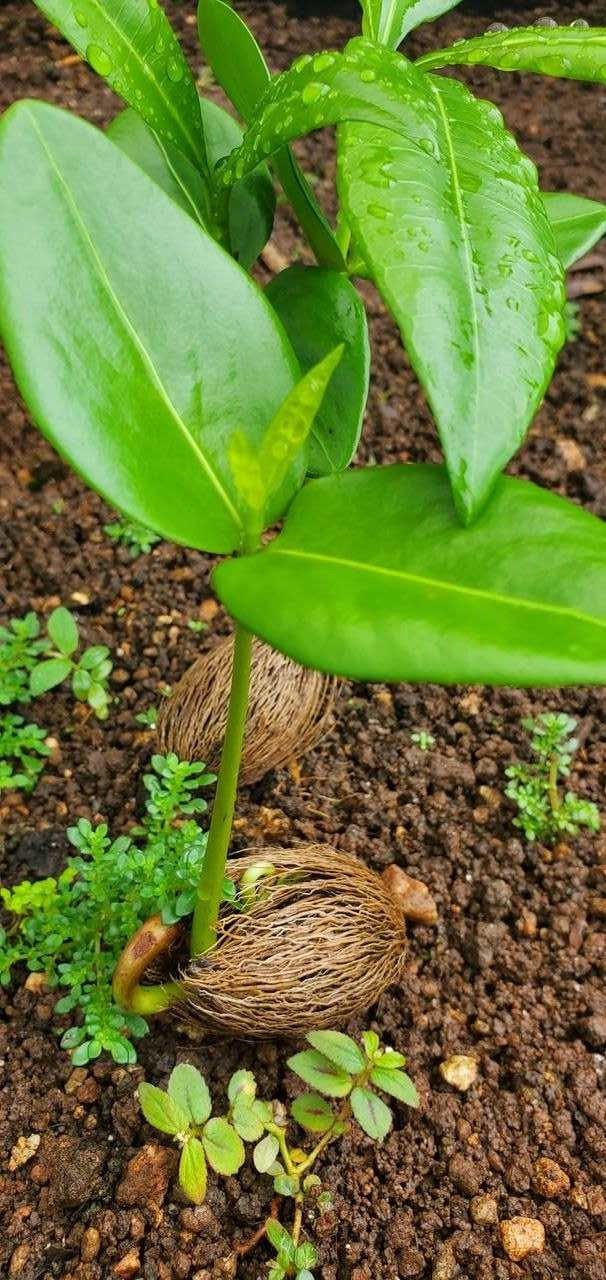
Fruit and seedling. Dededo, Guam

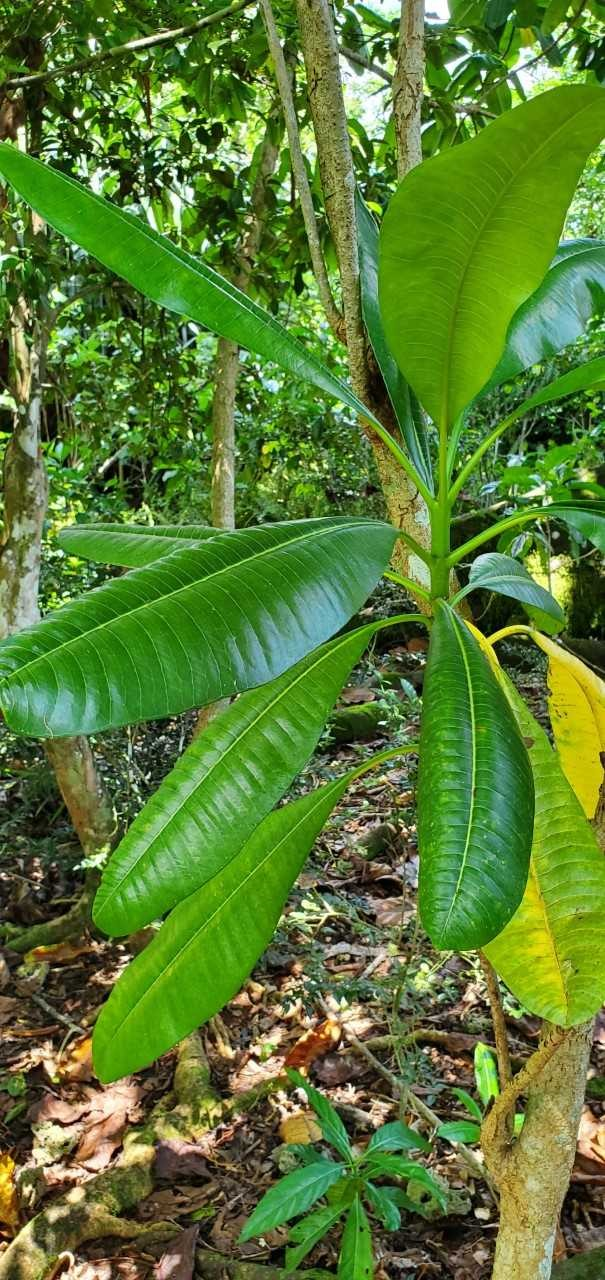
Leaves of understory tree. Dededo, Guam

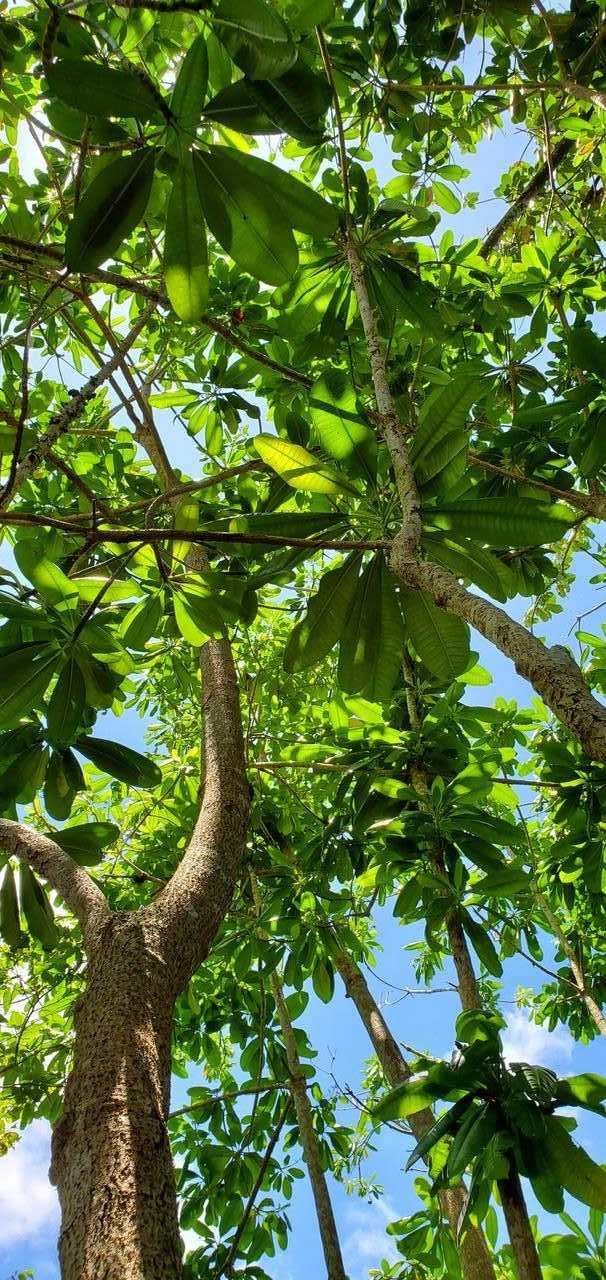
Canopy. Dededo, Guam

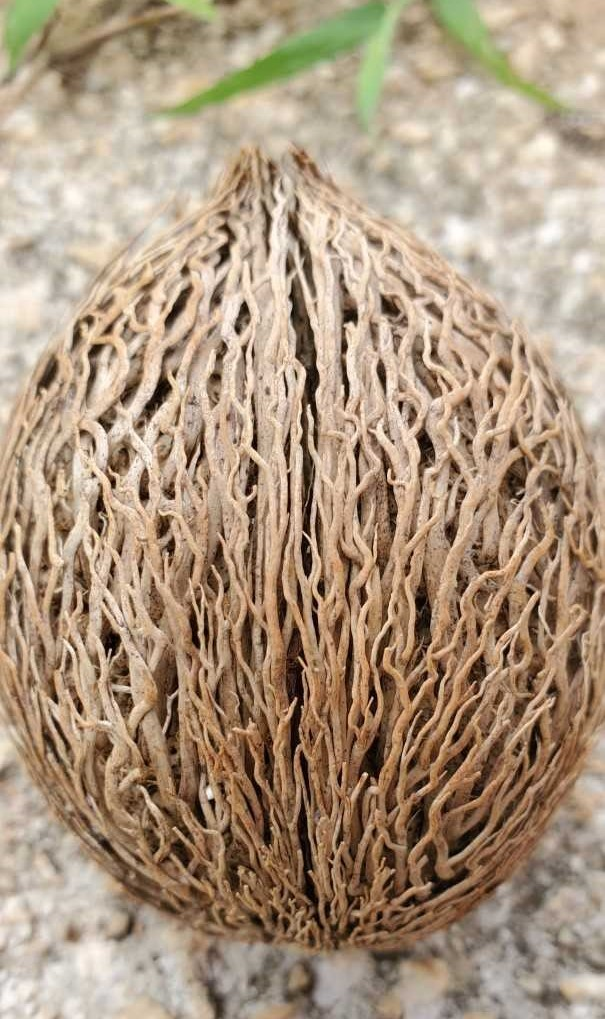
Fruit husk. Dededo, Guam
