= Ochrosia hexandra =

Scientific classification
- Kingdom: Plantae
- Clade: Tracheophytes
- Clade: Angiosperms
- Clade: Eudicots
- Clade: Asterids
- Order: Gentianales
- Family: Apocynaceae
- Genus: Ochrosia
- Species: O. hexandra

Binomial name
- Ochrosia hexandra Koidz.

Species of plant

Ochrosia hexandra is a species of flowering plant in the family Apocynaceae, native to the Japanese Volcano Islands. It was first described by Gen-ichi Koidzumi in 1918.
