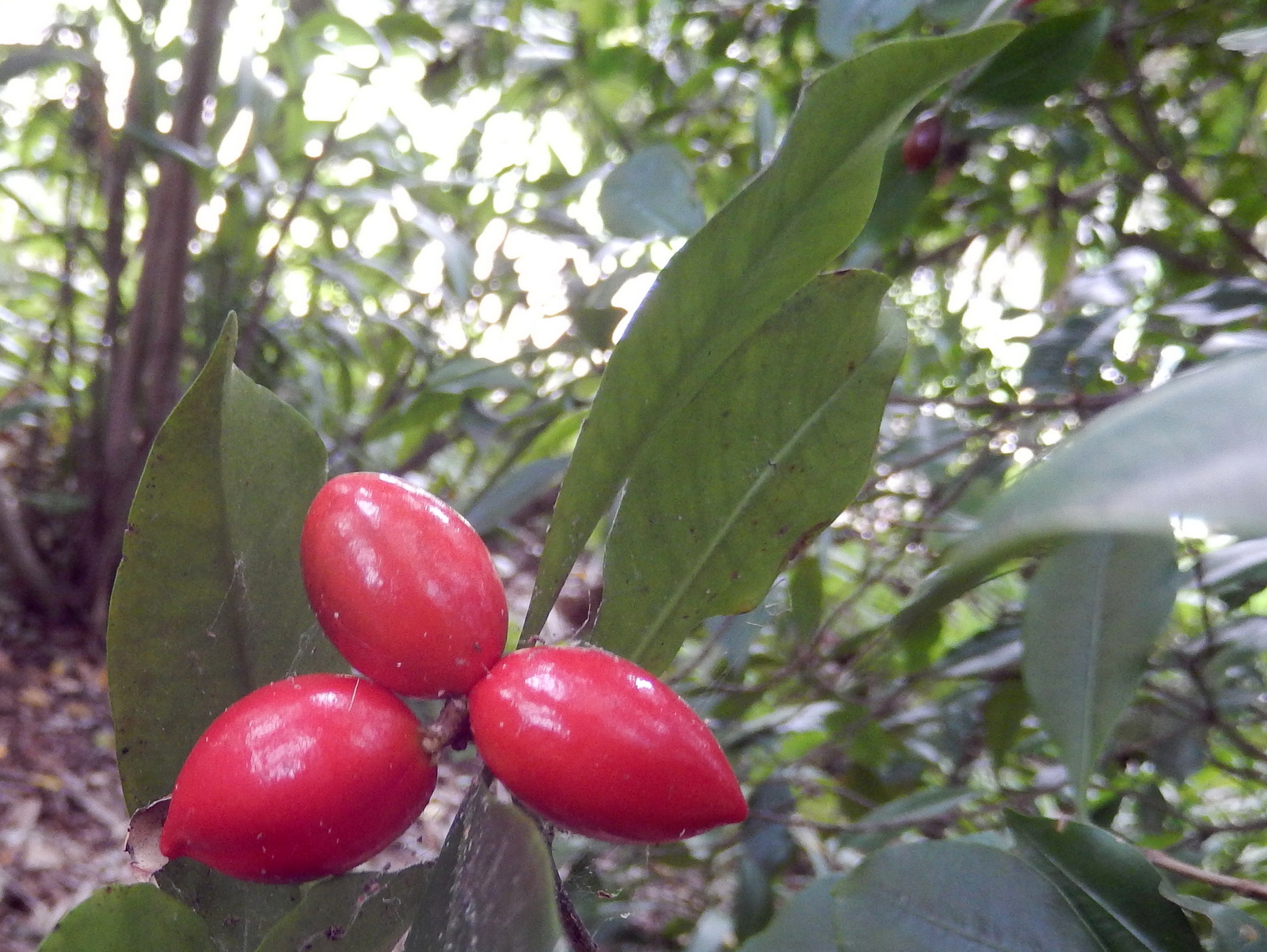

Scientific classification
- Kingdom: Plantae
- Clade: Tracheophytes
- Clade: Angiosperms
- Clade: Eudicots
- Clade: Asterids
- Order: Gentianales
- Family: Apocynaceae
- Genus: Ochrosia
- Species: O. poweri

Binomial name
- Ochrosia poweri F.M.Bailey

Synonyms
- Neisosperma poweri (F.M.Bailey) Fosberg & Sachet

= Ochrosia poweri =

Species of plant

Ochrosia poweri is a species of tree in the family Apocynaceae. Its natural habitat is tropical and subtropical rainforest in Australia (New South Wales and Queensland). Maximum height is about 10 metres.
