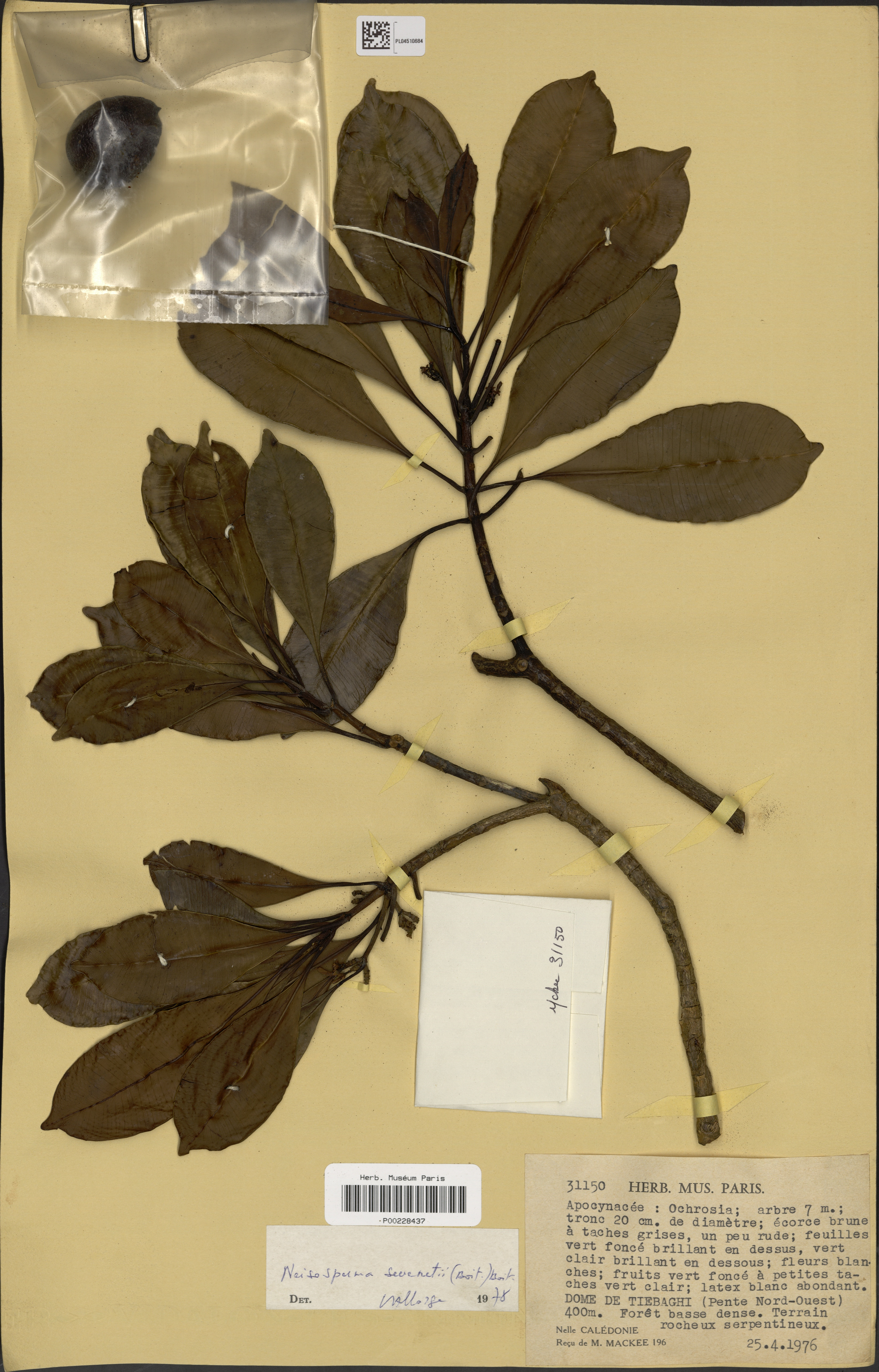

Conservation status
- Critically Endangered (IUCN 3.1)

Scientific classification
- Kingdom: Plantae
- Clade: Tracheophytes
- Clade: Angiosperms
- Clade: Eudicots
- Clade: Asterids
- Order: Gentianales
- Family: Apocynaceae
- Genus: Ochrosia
- Species: O. sevenetii

Binomial name
- Ochrosia sevenetii Boiteau

Synonyms
- Calpicarpum sevenetii (Boiteau) Boiteau; Neisosperma sevenetii (Boiteau) Boiteau

= Ochrosia sevenetii =

Species of plant

Ochrosia sevenetii, synonym Neisosperma sevenetii, is a species of flowering plant in the family Apocynaceae. It is endemic to New Caledonia, where it is known from only two sites. Its habitat is threatened with encroachment and fire.
