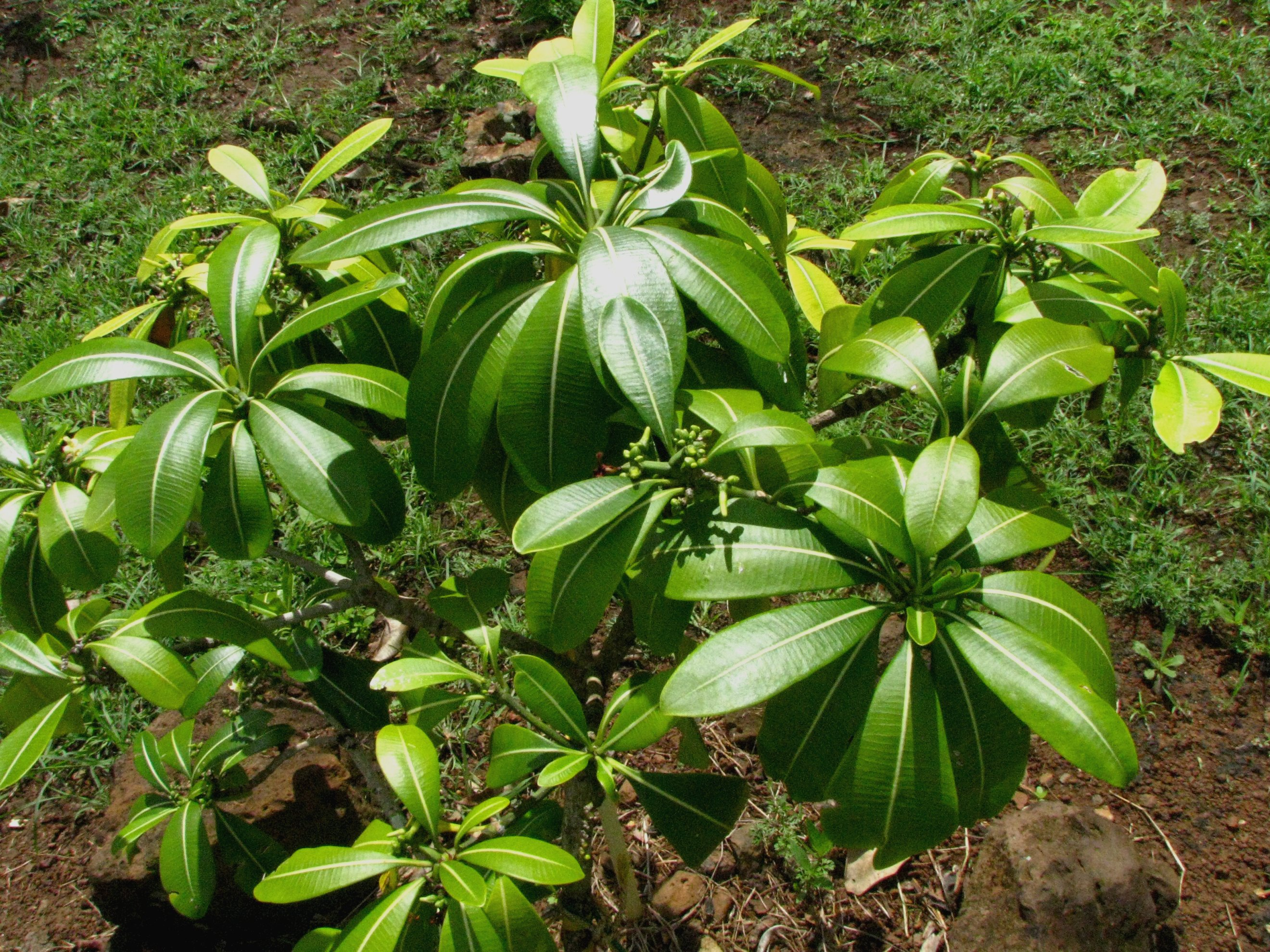

Conservation status
- Critically Endangered (IUCN 3.1)

Scientific classification
- Kingdom: Plantae
- Clade: Tracheophytes
- Clade: Angiosperms
- Clade: Eudicots
- Clade: Asterids
- Order: Gentianales
- Family: Apocynaceae
- Genus: Ochrosia
- Species: O. kauaiensis

Binomial name
- Ochrosia kauaiensis H.St.John

= Ochrosia kauaiensis =

Species of plant

Ochrosia kauaiensis, the Kauaʻi yellowwood, is a species of plant in the family Apocynaceae. It is endemic to the island of Kauaʻi in Hawaii. It is threatened by habitat loss.
