= La Revue de Téhéran =

French language monthly cultural magazine in Iran

- Editor: Amélie Neuve-Eglise
- Frequency: Monthly
- Format: 21/27cm
- Publisher: Ettela'at foundation
- First issue: October 2005
- Company: Ettela'at foundation
- Country: Iran
- Based in: Tehran
- Language: French
- Website: La Revue de Téhéran
- ISSN: 2008-1936

La Revue de Téhéran (French: Tehran Magazine) is an Iranian monthly magazine published in French, mainly devoted to issues pertaining to Iranian culture and traditions.

== History and profile ==
Founded in October 2005, La Revue de Téhéran is affiliated to the Ettela'at foundation that publishes both daily newspaper Ettela'at and other publications. With its headquarters being located in Tehran, it is the only Iranian magazine written in French to be equally distributed beyond its national frontiers to France and other francophone countries worldwide. The magazine is published by Presses Ettelaat on a monthly basis. It features articles on the culture and traditions of Iran.
