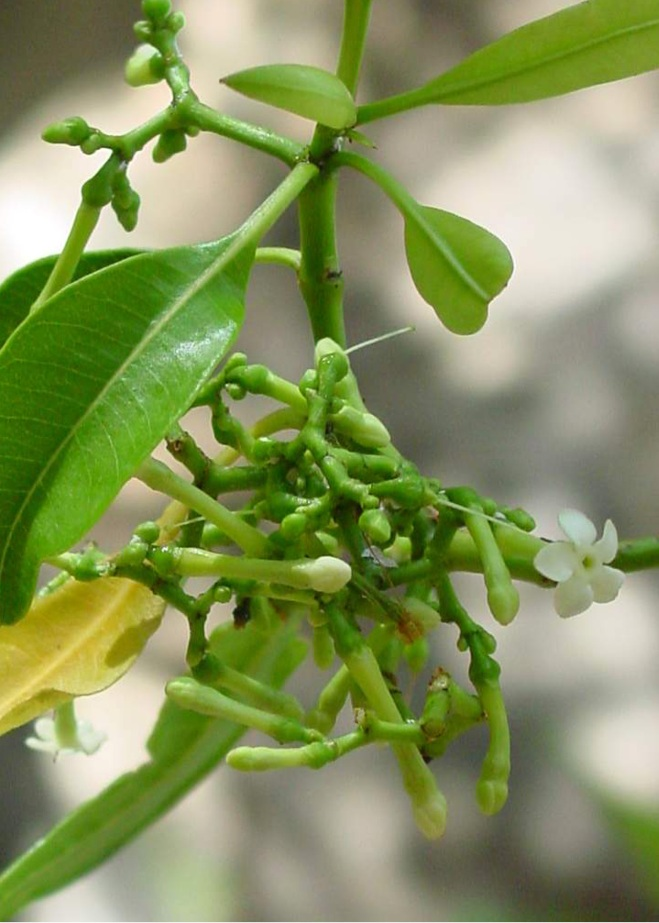
- Rauvolfia nukuhivensis, inflorescence with buds and open flower

Conservation status
- Critically Endangered (IUCN 3.1)

Scientific classification
- Kingdom: Plantae
- Clade: Tracheophytes
- Clade: Angiosperms
- Clade: Eudicots
- Clade: Asterids
- Order: Gentianales
- Family: Apocynaceae
- Genus: Rauvolfia
- Species: R. nukuhivensis

Binomial name
- Rauvolfia nukuhivensis (Fosberg & Sachet) Lorence & Butaud

Synonyms
- Ochrosia nukuhivensis Fosberg & Sachet

= Rauvolfia nukuhivensis =

Species of plant

Rauvolfia nukuhivensis is a species of plant in the family Apocynaceae. It is endemic to Nuku Hiva in the Marquesas Islands in French Polynesia.

In 1988, the species was classified as extinct by the IUCN. However, extant populations have since been documented in several localities on Nuku Hiva, and it is now considered Critically Endangered instead.
