= Philippe Lefait =

French journalist

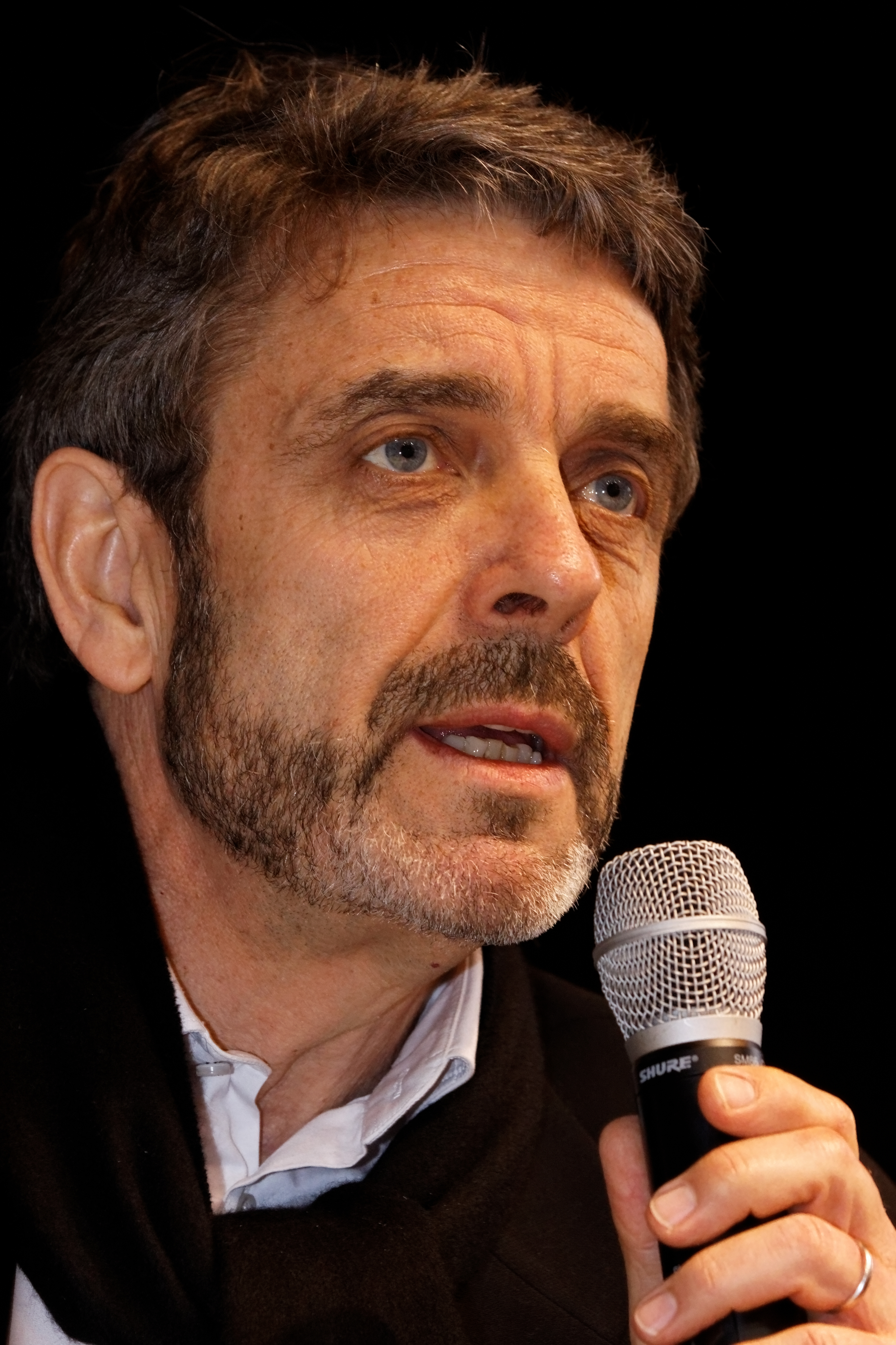
- Philippe Lefait at Festival du Livre de Paris in March 2012
- Born: December 27, 1953 (age 72); Hénin-Beaumont, Pas-de-Calais, France
- Citizenship: French
- Education: École supérieure de journalisme de Lille
- Occupations: journalist, television presenter

Philippe Lefait, born on December 27, 1953 in Hénin-Beaumont, Pas-de-Calais, is a French journalist. He was a foreign correspondent for Europe 1 from 1979 to 1985. He then joined public television, where he notably directed the foreign politics department, presented news programs on Antenne 2 and France 2, and created and produced the magazine Des mots de minuit from 1999 to 2020. In 2022, he proposed a series on TV5 Monde about the backstage careers in live performing arts.

== Biography ==
Born in Pas-de-Calais, Philippe Lefait grew up in Noyelles-sous-Lens and completed his secondary education at the Lycée Condorcet in Lens. He graduated in law and attended the École supérieure de journalisme de Lille. His first reportages and freelance work were for Le Point, Le Matin de Paris, and Le Magazine Littéraire in Central America (1980-81). As a Lauga scholar, he spent five years in the foreign politics department of Europe 1 before becoming a senior reporter and then head of the foreign department at Antenne 2. He also presented the news from the editorial team from 1987 to 1991 before taking charge of the Vie contemporaine department (society and culture) at the channel. He was part of the teams for "Résistances," "L’Assiette anglaise," "France panorama," and "Agapé," magazines of the channel.

In 1998, he succeeded Laure Adler as the host of the cultural magazine Le Cercle de minuit.

Starting in 1999, he was the producer and presenter of the cultural magazine Des mots de minuit, the show that succeeded Cercle de minuit in the same time slot, first in a televised version broadcast on France 2 until June 26, 2013 (499 episodes), and then in a simplified version broadcast exclusively by the Culturebox website of France Télévisions from July 2014 until its final broadcast in September 2020.

He created the documentary magazines 45Tours and Grommelots on France Inter in 1995 and 1996.

In 2022, he proposed a series on TV5 Monde about the backstage careers in live performing arts.

Father of two daughters, Philippe Lefait is married to editor Pom Bessot. Together, in 2013, they wrote and published the account Et tu danses, Lou, a testimony about their daughter's language issues linked to a genetic disease. The book was adapted for the theater in 2015 (Off Avignon) and performed again in 2016 at the "Théâtre des Déchargeurs" in Paris.

He is vice-president of GAPAS and AFHAR-TCL, two associations that notably initiated the creation of MÉMO, a communal habitat for 8 young adults with Complex Language Disorders (TCL).

== Works ==
- Des souliers et des hommes, pro d'Hervé Bacquer, Éditions Julliard, Paris, 1993, ISBN 2-26000-062-2
- Quatre ministres et puis s'en vont…, Éditions de l'Atelier, 1995, ISBN 2-70823-105-7
- Les Entretiens de la Cité, Le Cherche midi, Paris, 2005, ISBN 2-74910-357-6
- Petit Lexique intranquille de la télévision, Éditions Stock, 2011 ISBN 978-2234064577
- Et tu danses, Lou, with Pom Bessot, Éditions Stock, 2013 ISBN 9782234073272
