= Patrice Franceschi =

French adventurer (born 1954)

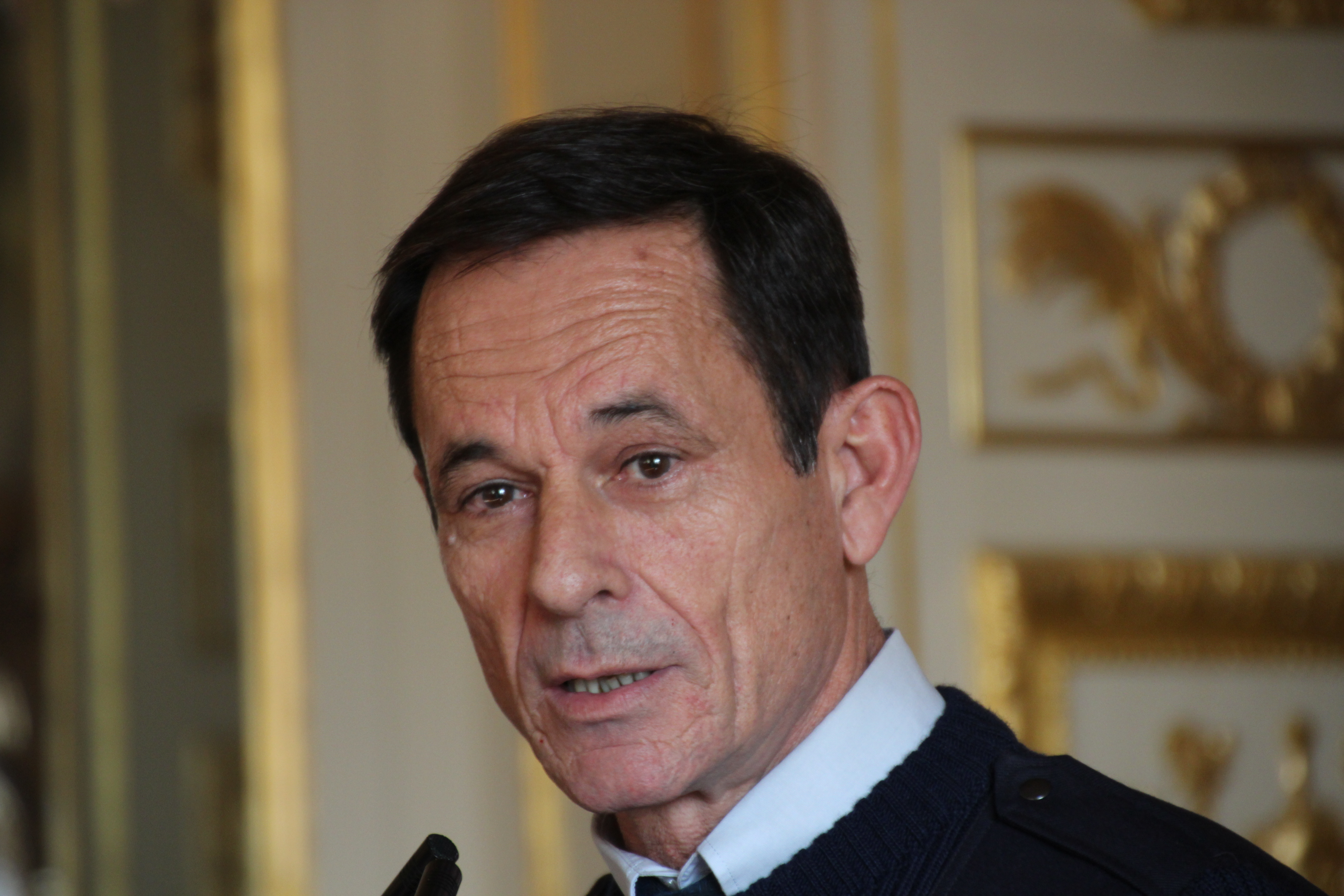
Picture taken during the Patrice Franceschi's reception as Marine writer on February 10, 2014 at the Hôtel de la Marine on the Place de la Concorde in Paris, France.

Patrice Franceschi (born December 18, 1954, in Toulon) is a French adventurer of Corsican descent.

Franceschi is also a writer, a documentary & film maker, a sailor and a pilot. He has been awarded several medals and distinctions. Patrice Franceschi was also at the origins of many humanitarian missions in war zones (Bosnia-Herzegovina, Kurdistan, Somalia, Afghanistan, etc.). He is former chairman of the Société des explorateurs français, and former chairman and co-founder of Solidarités International.

Franceschi is the captain of the 3-masted schooner La Boudeuse, aiming at scientific expeditions related to social evolutions and climate change matters. He is most famous for being the first man to carry a solo around-the-world flight in an Aviasud Sirocco ultralight aeroplane from September 26, 1984, to March 26, 1987. Following this tour of 2 1/2 years (562 hours of flight, across 33 countries), he wrote a book recounting his expedition: La folle équipée.

He also took part in many expeditions, including the project The Spirit of Bougainville, whose first ship La Boudeuse (a Chinese junk, thirty meters long), sank 130 miles east of Malta.

He is the author of numerous books and has directed several films from his expeditions.

== Awards and honours ==
- 2015 Prix Goncourt de la Nouvelle for Première personne du singulier
