= Pierre Boiteau =

French botanist

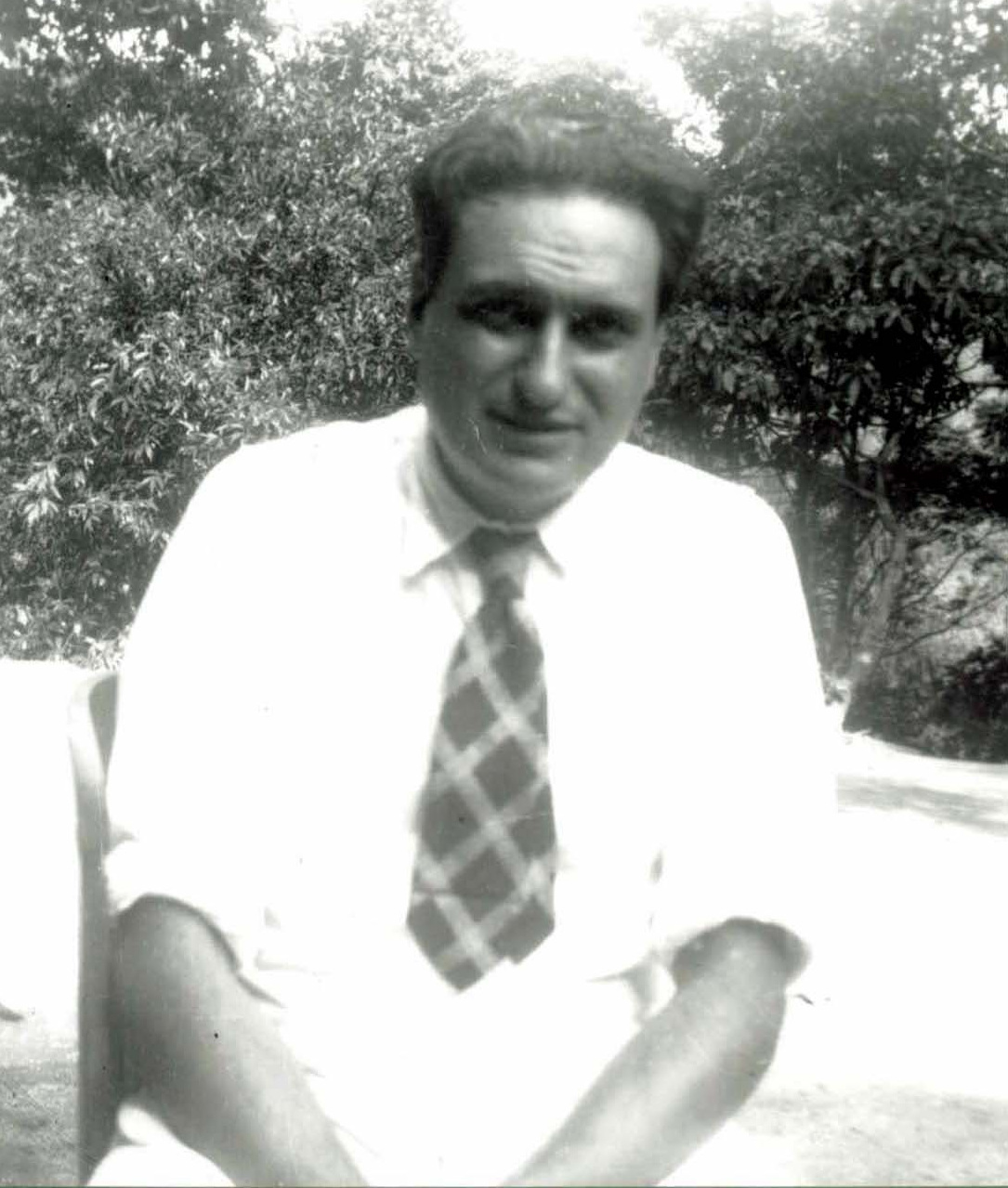
- Born: 3 December 1911; Cognac, France
- Died: 1 September 1980 (aged 68); Orsay, France
- Education: School of Horticulture, Versailles
- Known for: Studies of the botany of Madagascar
- Children: Lucile Boiteau-Allorge
- Scientific career
- Fields: Botany, medicine
- Institutions: Antsirabe, Antananarivo (both Madagascar); French Union, CNRS, Gif-sur-Yvette
- Author abbrev. (botany): Boiteau

Pierre Louis Boiteau was a French botanist, born on 3 December 1911 in Cognac and dying on 1 September 1980 in Orsay, Essonne. One of his daughters, Lucile Boiteau-Allorge, is also a botanist.

== Life ==
After studying at the School of Horticulture in Versailles, Pierre Boiteau left for Madagascar in 1932 to do his military service there, which ended at the end of 1933. He spent much of his life in Madagascar, but returned to France in the last years of his career. He died of cancer in 1980.

== Career in Madagascar ==
In 1934 he started a herbarium. He was initially in charge of the green spaces of Antsirabe and created the Parc de l'Est there. From September 1935, he had a position at the botanical and zoological park of Tsimbazaza in Antananarivo. During this time, he learned the Malagasy language and obtained the higher certificate in it in 1937.

In 1936 Dr. Ch. Grimes asked him to accompany him to the leprosarium of Manankavely, on the road to Tamatave, where speaking Malagasy would allow him to come into contact with a traditional practitioner. He identified six plants used in traditional medicine, including Centella asiatica. His clinical studies started in 1937, as the start of research that would end in 1942 with the identification of asiaticoside, and the development of a healing drug, Madecassol with Albert Rakoto Ratsimamanga. The financial benefits allowed the creation of the Malagasy Institute of Applied Research, which still exists though its two co-founders have died.

With Ratsimamanga he wrote many articles, including the Elements of Malagasy Pharmacopoeia. Only the first volume was published, on account of insufficient funds. In 1979 Boiteau published alone a Précis of Madagascan materia medica.

== Return to France ==
Boiteau was adviser and secretary of the French Union from 1949 to 1958. Between 1949 and 1952 he was a research associate at the CNRS, with Edgar Lederer and André Lwoff as sponsors. Then he was director of the plant identification laboratory at the ICSN-CNRS in Gif-sur-Yvette, Essonne from 1968 until his death.

== Recognition ==
On 1 September 1982, the Madagascar post office released a stamp with the effigy of Pierre Boiteau.
