= 1600–1650 in Western fashion =

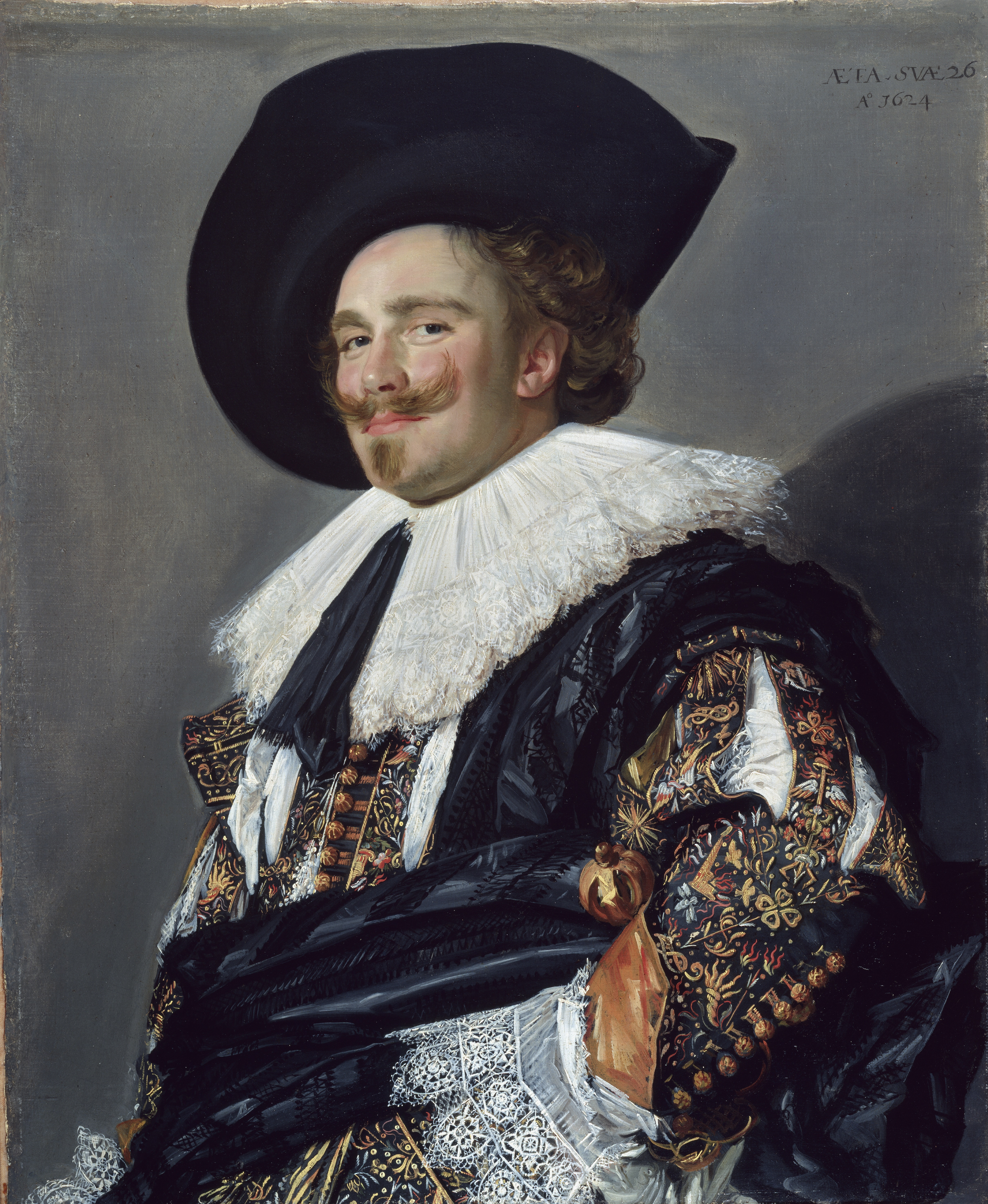
Frans Hals' Laughing Cavalier (in the Wallace Collection) wears a slashed doublet, wide reticella lace collar and cuffs, and a broadbrimmed hat, 1624

Fashion in the period 1600–1650 in Western clothing is characterized by the disappearance of the ruff in favour of broad lace or linen collars. Waistlines rose through the period for both men and women. Other notable fashions included full, slashed sleeves and tall or broad hats with brims. For men, hose disappeared in favour of breeches.

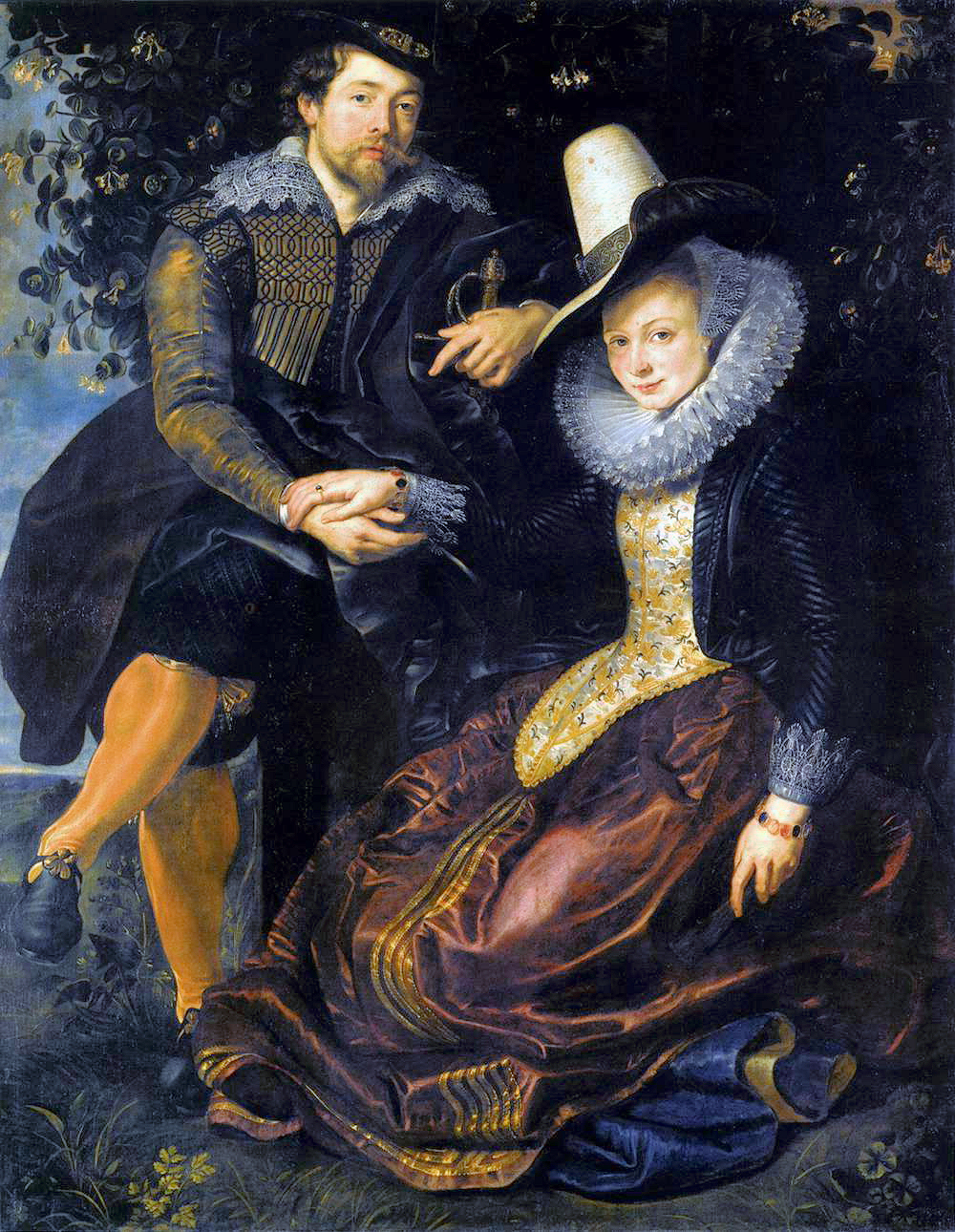
The artist Rubens with his first wife c. 1610. Her long, rounded stomacher and jacket-like bodice are characteristic Dutch fashions.

The silhouette, which was essentially close to the body with tight sleeves and a low, pointed waist until around 1615, gradually softened and broadened. Sleeves became very full, and in the 1620s and 1630s were often paned or slashed to show the voluminous sleeves of the shirt or chemise beneath.

Spanish fashions remained very conservative. The ruff lingered longest in Spain and the Netherlands, but disappeared first for men and later for women in France and England.

The social tensions leading to the English Civil War were reflected in English fashion, with the elaborate French styles popular at the courts of James I and his son Charles I contrasting with the sober styles in sadd colours favoured by Puritans and exported to the early settlements of New England (see below).

In the early decades of the century, a trend among poets and artists to adopt a fashionable pose of melancholia is reflected in fashion, where the characteristic touches are dark colours, open collars, unbuttoned robes or doublets, and a generally disheveled appearance, accompanied in portraits by world-weary poses and sad expressions.

== Fashions influenced by royal courts ==
=== Fabric and patterns ===
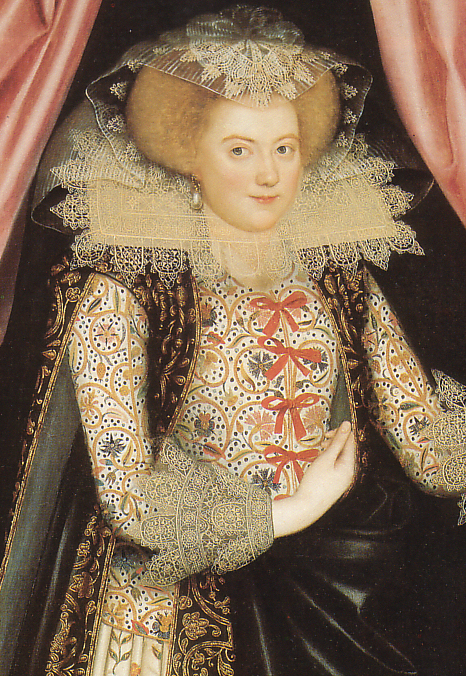
Scrolling floral embroidery decorates this Englishwoman's dress, petticoat, and linen jacket, accented with blue-tinted reticella collar, cuffs, and headdress, c. 1614–18.

Figured silks with elaborate pomegranate or artichoke patterns are still seen in this period, especially in Spain, but a lighter style of scrolling floral motifs, woven or embroidered, was popular, especially in England.

The great flowering of needlelace occurred in this period. Geometric reticella deriving from cutwork was elaborated into true needlelace or punto in aria (called in England "point lace"), which also reflected the popular scrolling floral designs.

In England, embroidered linen silk jackets fastened with ribbon ties were fashionable for both men and women from c. 1600–1620, as was reticella tinted with yellow starch. Overgowns with split sleeves (often trimmed with horizontal rows of braid) were worn by both men and women.

From the 1620s, surface ornament fell out of fashion in favour of solid-colour satins, and functional ribbon bows or points became elaborate masses of rosettes and looped trim.

=== Portraiture and fantasy ===
In England from the 1630s, under the influence of literature and especially court masques, Anthony van Dyck and his followers created a fashion for having one's portrait painted in exotic, historical or pastoral dress, or in simplified contemporary fashion with various scarves, cloaks, mantles, and jewels added to evoke a classic or romantic mood, and also to prevent the portrait appearing dated within a few years. These paintings are the progenitors of the fashion of the later 17th century for having one's portrait painted in undress, and do not necessarily reflect clothing as it was actually worn.

== Women's fashions ==
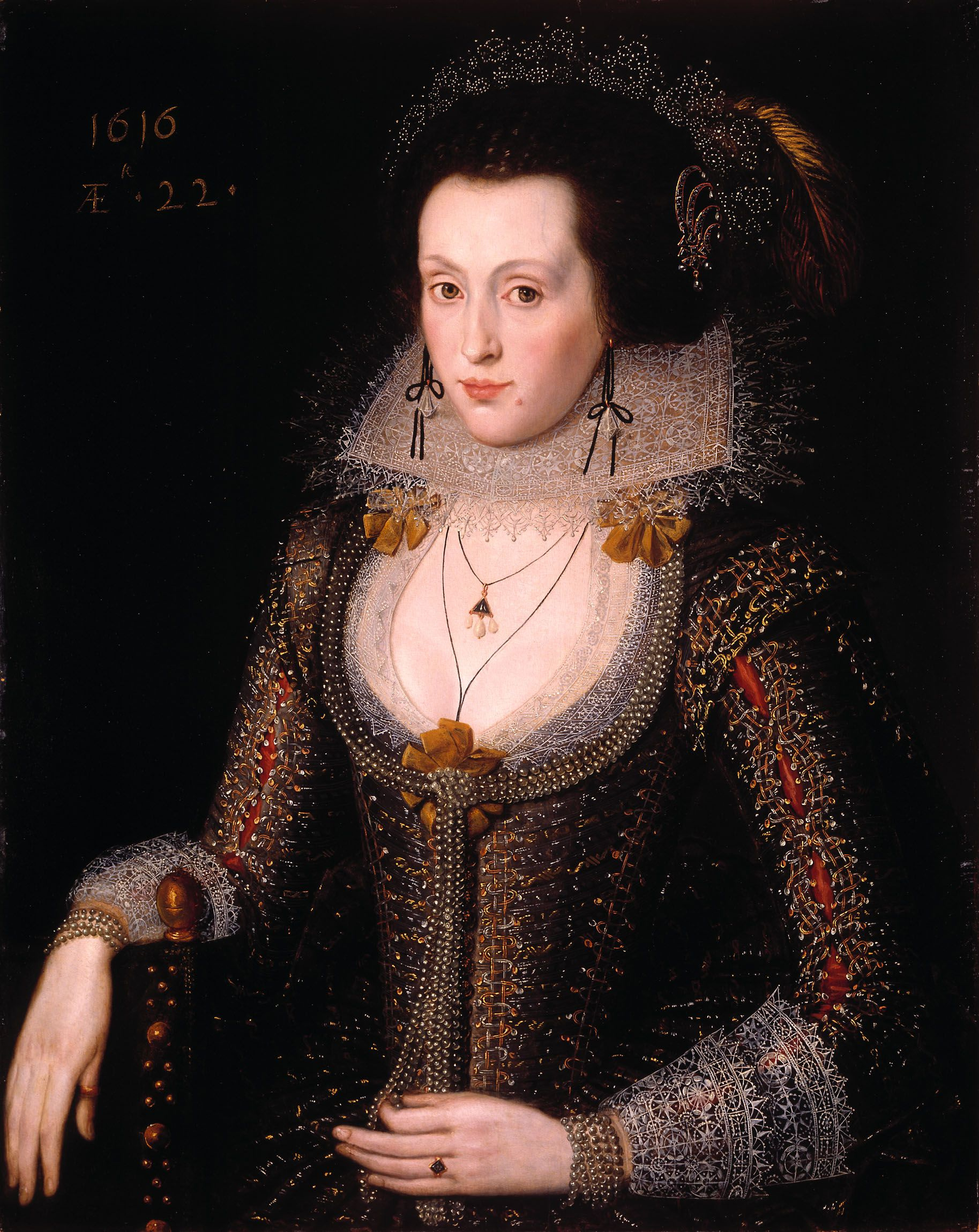
Elizabeth Poulett wears a low rounded neckline and a small ruff paired with a winged collar. Her tight sleeves have pronounced shoulder wings and deep lace cuffs. English court costume, 1616

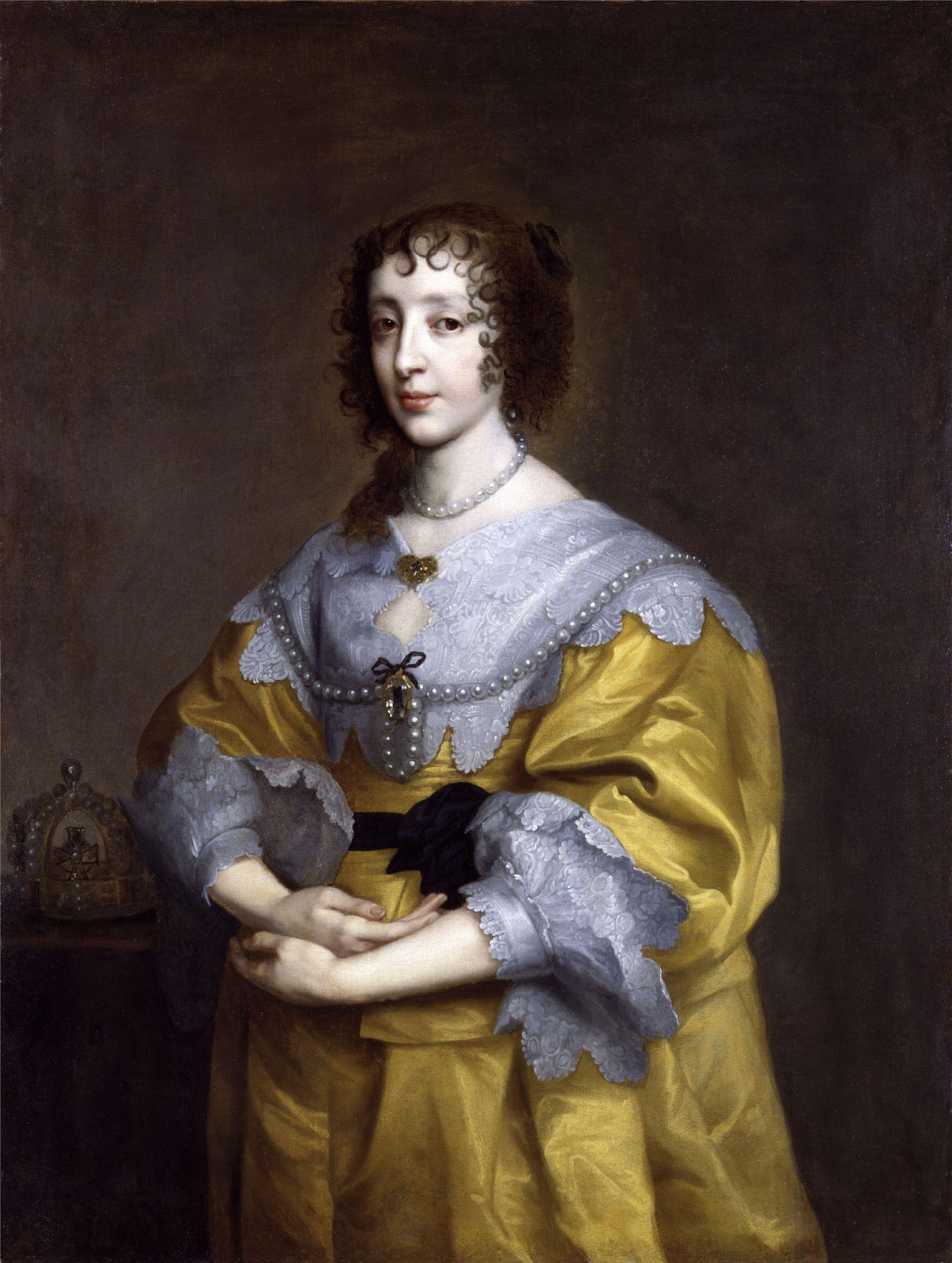
Henrietta Maria, wife of Charles I of England, wears a closed satin high-waisted bodice with tabbed skirts and open three-quarter sleeves over full chemise sleeves. She wears a ribbon sash. C. 1632–1635.

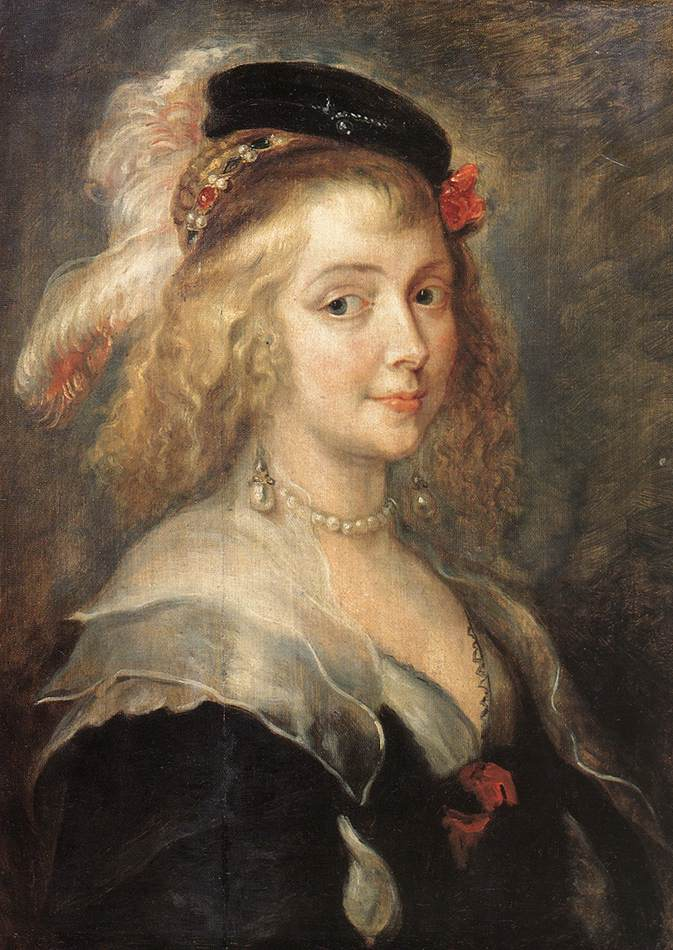
Helena Fourment in the hairstyle and neckline of c. 1630

=== Gowns, bodices, and petticoats ===
In the early years of the new century, fashionable bodices had high necklines or extremely low, rounded necklines, and short wings at the shoulders. Separate closed cartwheel ruffs were sometimes worn, with the standing collar, supported by a small wire frame or supportasse used for more casual wear and becoming more common later. Long sleeves were worn with deep cuffs to match the ruff. The cartwheel ruff disappeared in fashionable England by 1613.

By the mid-1620s, styles were relaxing. Ruffs were discarded in favor of wired collars which were called rebatos in continental Europe and, later, wide, flat collars. By the 1630s and 1640s, collars were accompanied by kerchiefs similar to the linen kerchiefs worn by middle-class women in the previous century; Often the collar and kerchief were trimmed with matching lace.

Bodices were long-waisted at the beginning of the century, but waistlines rose steadily to the mid-1630s before beginning to drop again. In the second decade of the 17th century, short tabs developed attached to the bottom of the bodice covering the bum-roll which supported the skirts. These tabs grew longer during the 1620s and were worn with a stomacher which filled the gap between the two front edges of the bodice. By 1640, the long tabs had almost disappeared and a longer, smoother figure became fashionable: The waist returned to normal height at the back and sides with a low point at the front.

The long, tight sleeves of the early 17th century grew shorter, fuller, and looser. A common style of the 1620s and 1630s was the virago sleeve, a full, slashed sleeve gathered into two puffs by a ribbon or other trim above the elbow.

In France and England, lightweight bright or pastel-coloured satins replaced dark, heavy fabrics. As in other periods, painters tended to avoid the difficulty of painting striped fabrics; it is clear from inventories that these were common. Short strings of pearls were fashionable.

Unfitted gowns (called nightgowns in England) with long hanging sleeves, short open sleeves, or no sleeves at all were worn over the bodice and skirt and tied with a ribbon sash at the waist. In England of the 1610s and 1620s, a loose nightgown was often worn over an embroidered jacket called a waistcoat and a contrasting embroidered petticoat, without a farthingale. Black gowns were worn for the most formal occasions; they fell out of fashion in England in the 1630s in favour of gowns to match the bodice and petticoat, but remained an important item of clothing on the Continent.

At least in the Netherlands the open-fronted overgown or vlieger was strictly reserved for married women. Before marriage the bouwen, "a dress with a fitted bodice and a skirt that was closed all round" was worn instead; it was known in England as a "Dutch" or "round gown".

Skirts might be open in front to reveal an underskirt or petticoat until about 1630, or closed all around; closed skirts were sometimes carried or worn looped up to reveal a petticoat.

Corsets were shorter to suit the new bodices, and might have a very stiff busk in the center front extending to the depth of the stomacher. Skirts were held in the proper shape by a padded roll or French farthingale holding the skirts out in a rounded shape at the waist, falling in soft folds to the floor. The drum or wheel farthingale was worn at the English court until the death of Anne of Denmark in 1619.

=== Hairstyles and headdresses ===
To about 1613, hair was worn feathered high over the forehead. Married women wore their hair in a linen coif or cap, often with lace trim. Tall hats like those worn by men were adopted for outdoor wear.

In a characteristic style of 1625–1650, hair was worn in loose waves to the shoulders on the sides, with the rest of the hair gathered or braided into a high bun at the back of the head. A short fringe or bangs might be worn with this style. Very fashionable married women abandoned the linen cap and wore their hair uncovered or with a hat.

=== Style gallery 1600–1620 ===
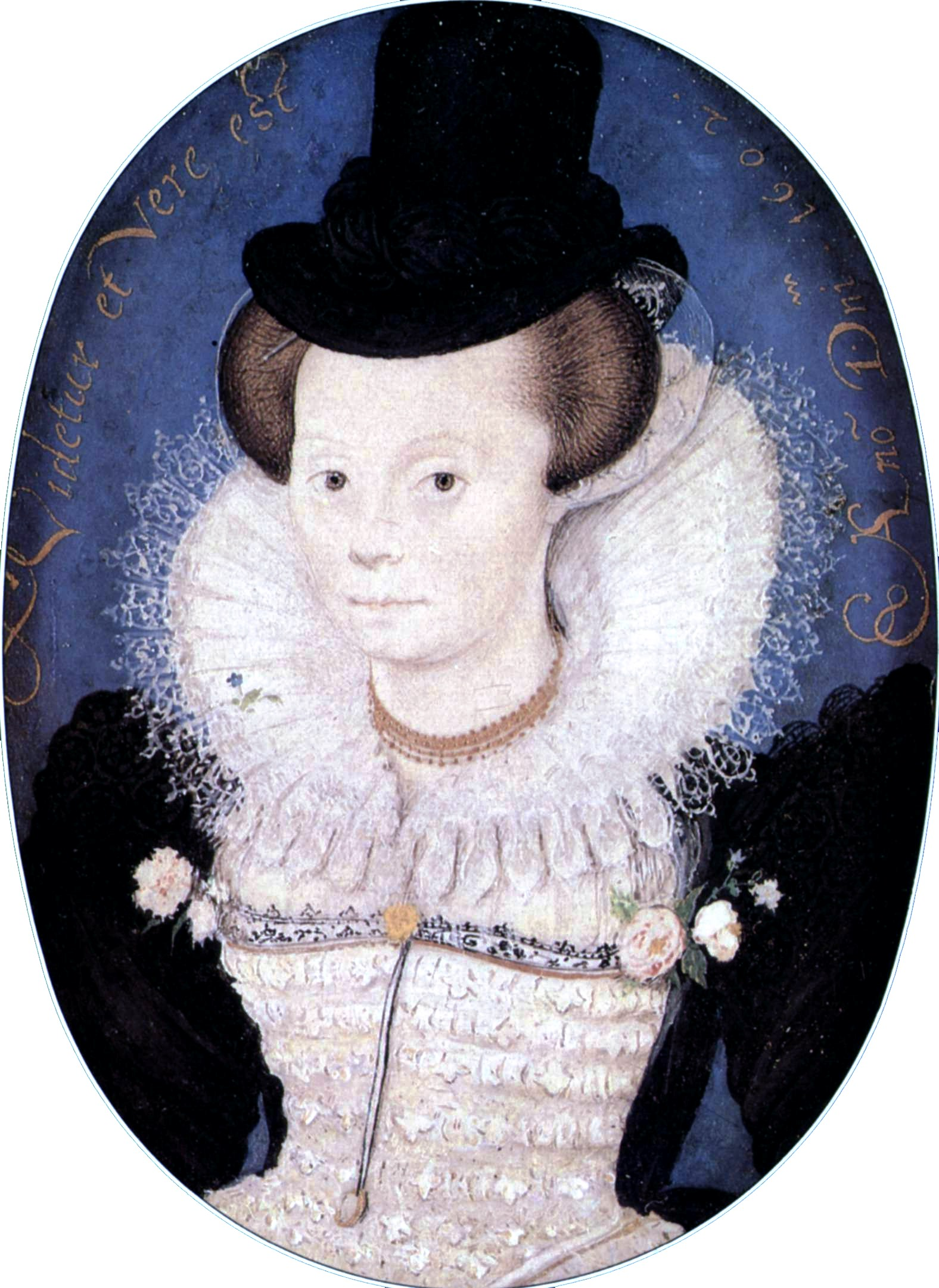
1 – 1602

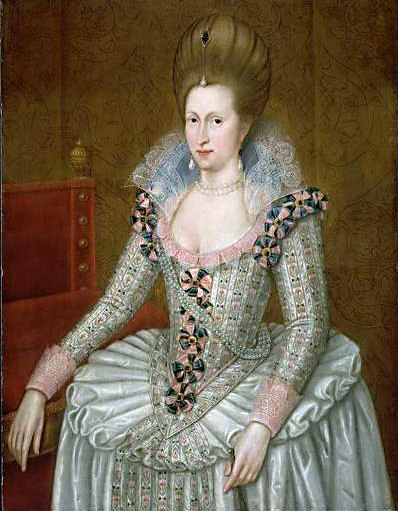
2 – 1605

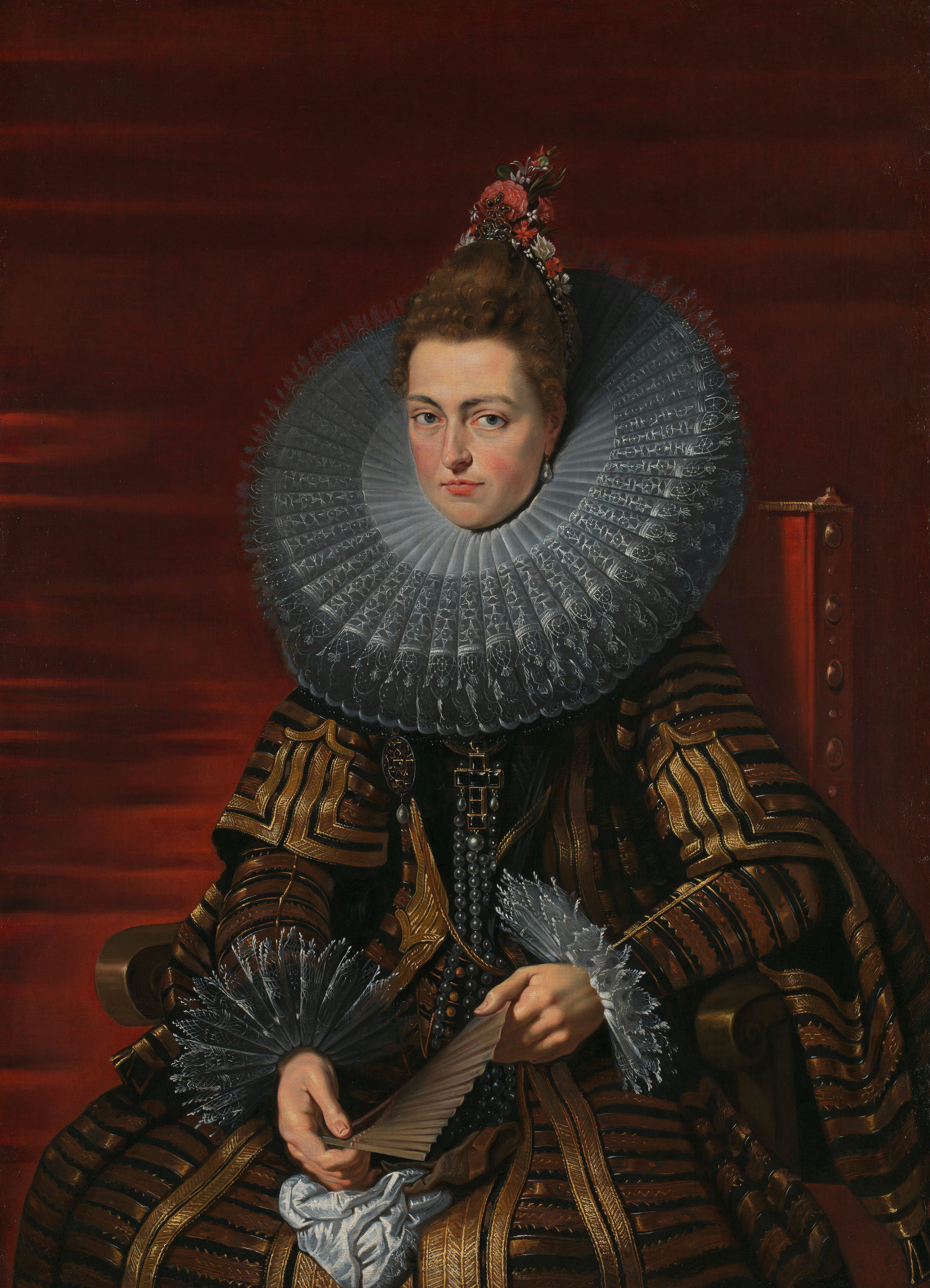
3 – 1609

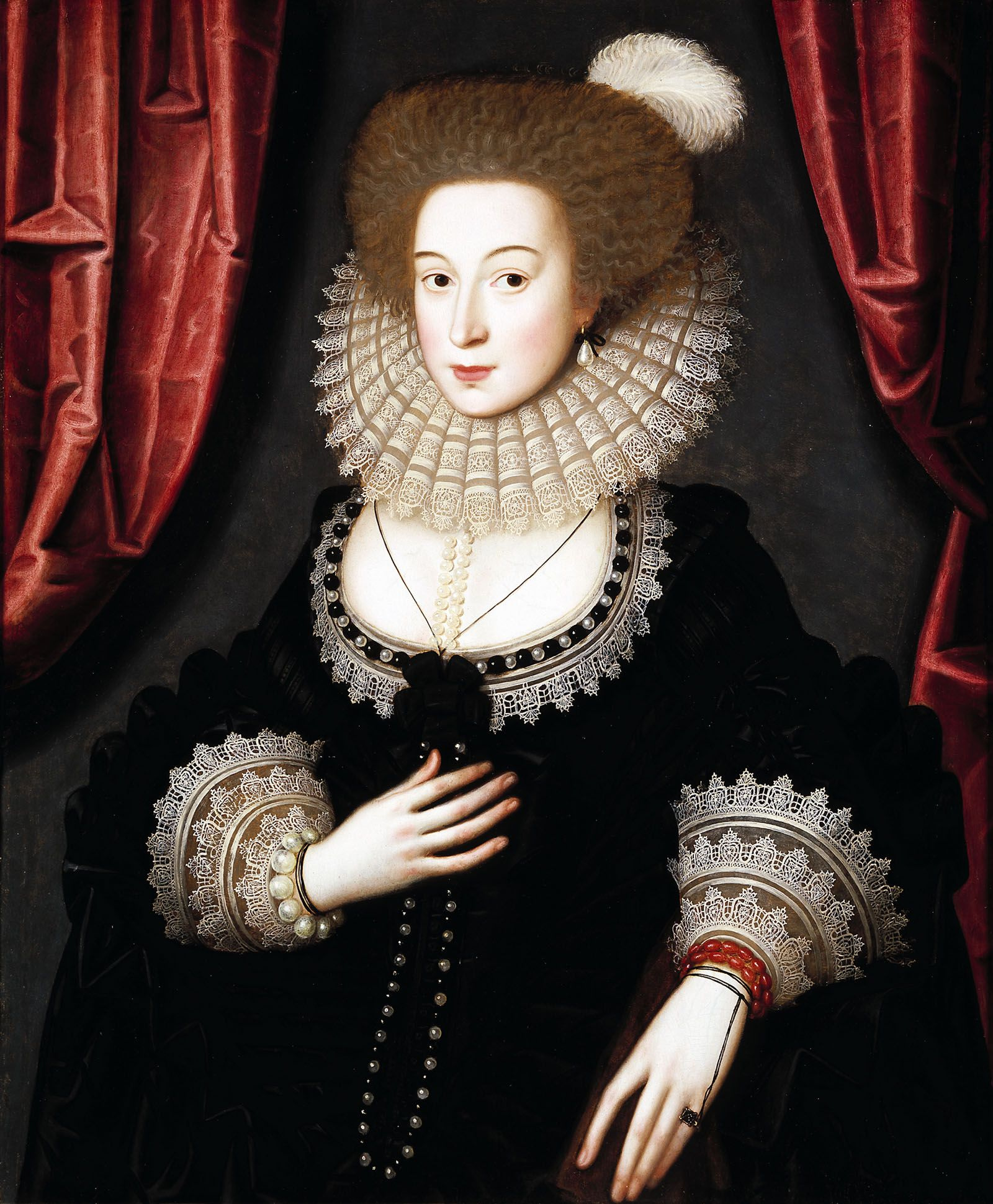
4 – 1610s

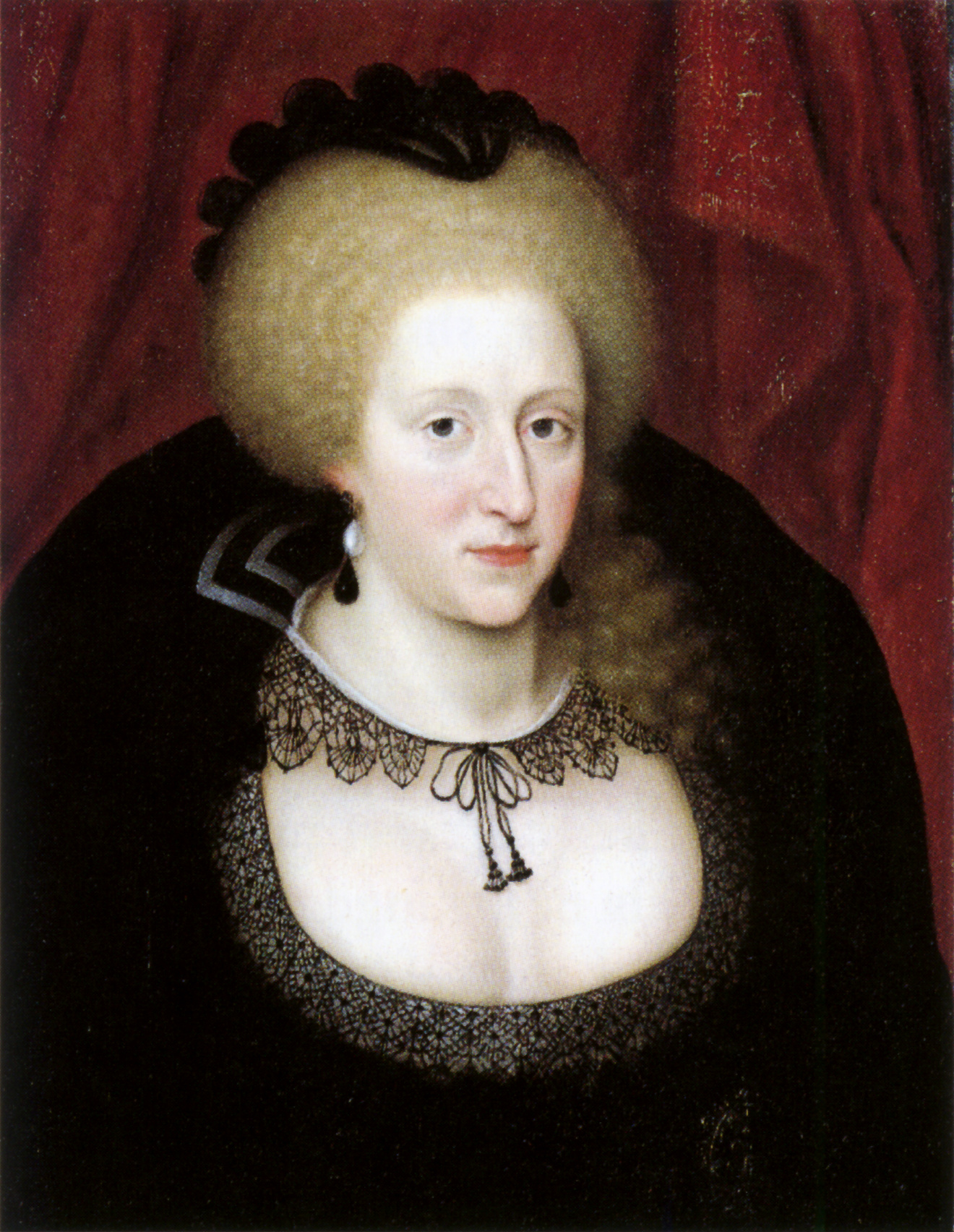
5 – 1612

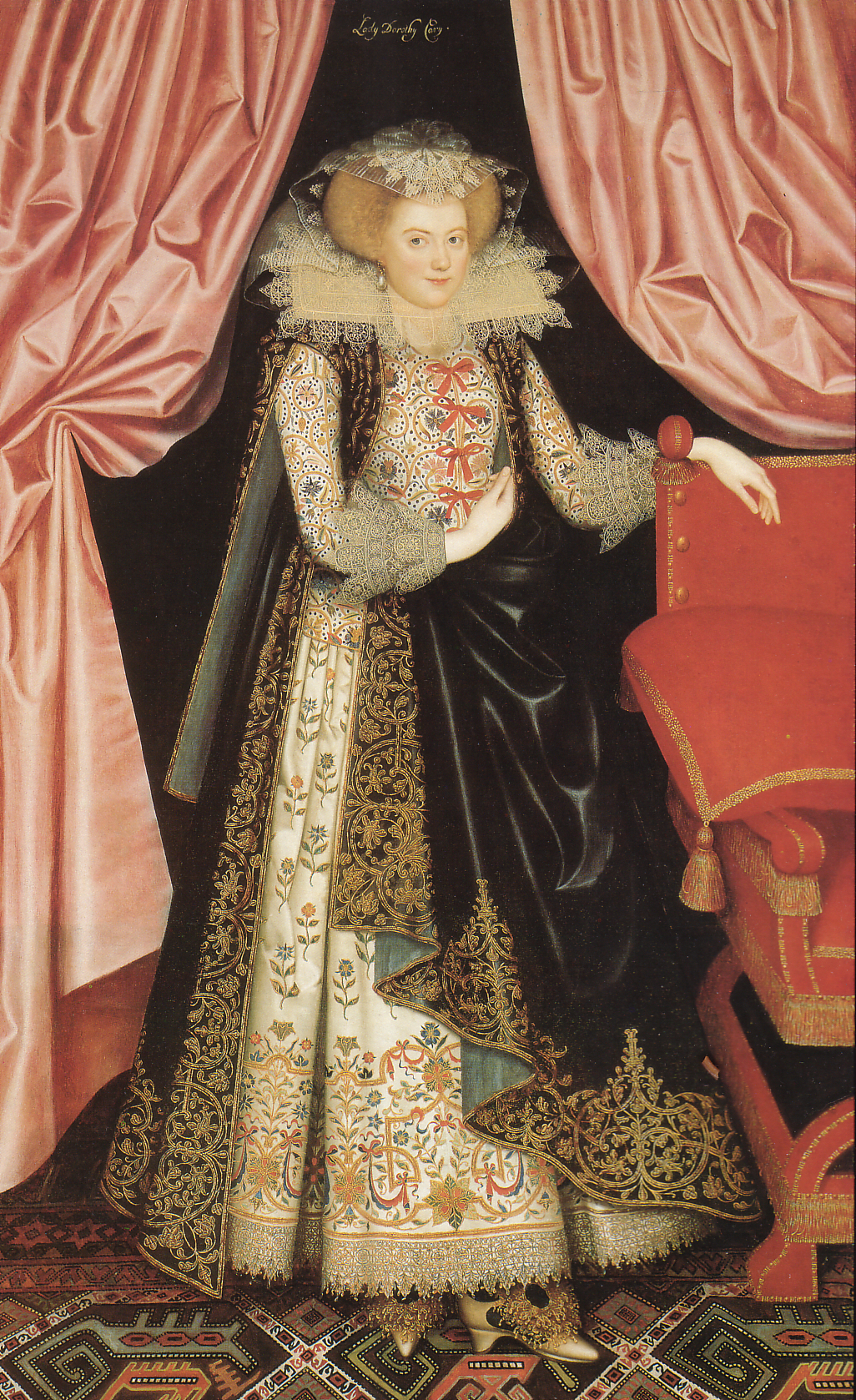
6 – 1614–18

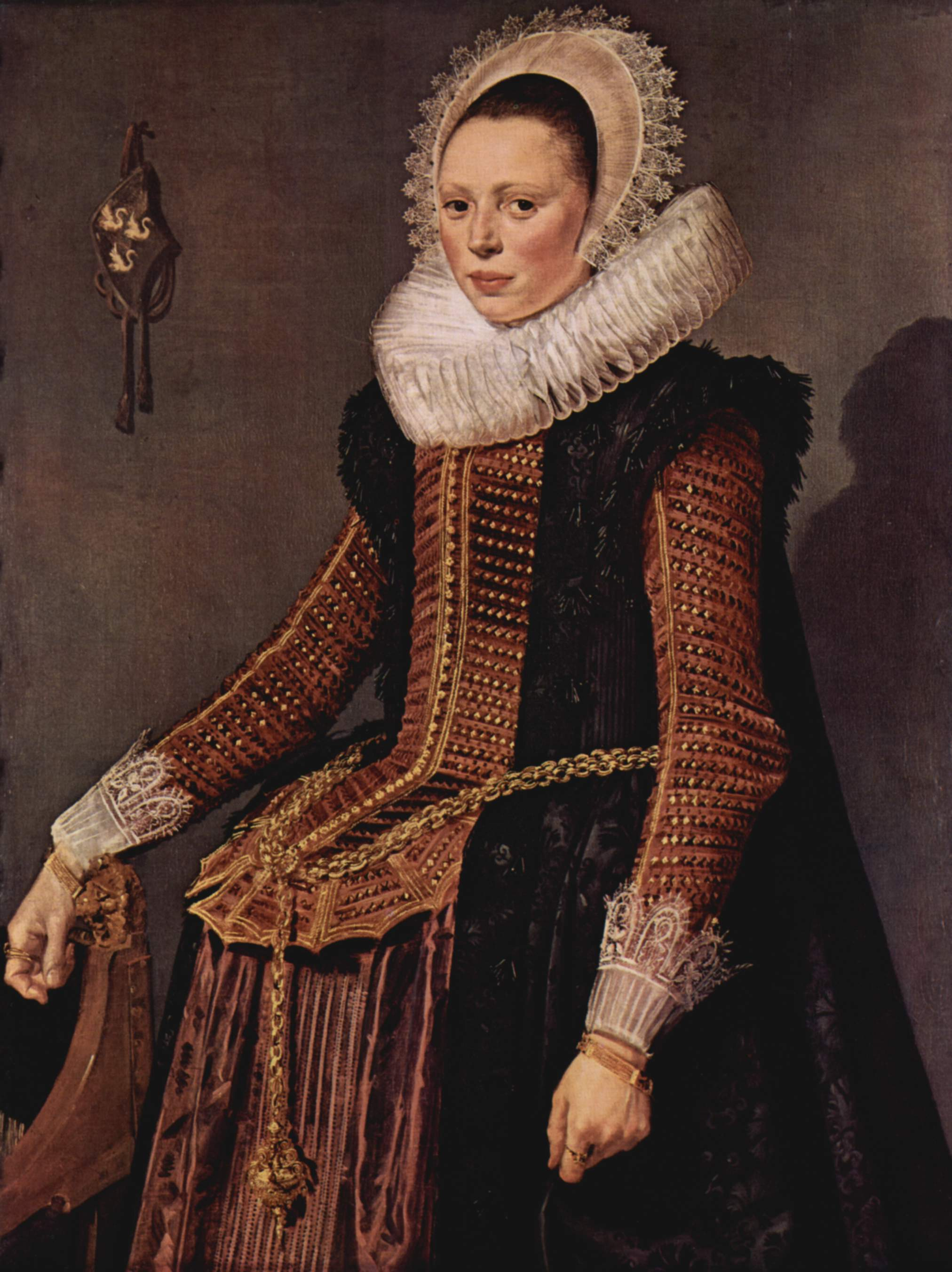
7 – 1618–20

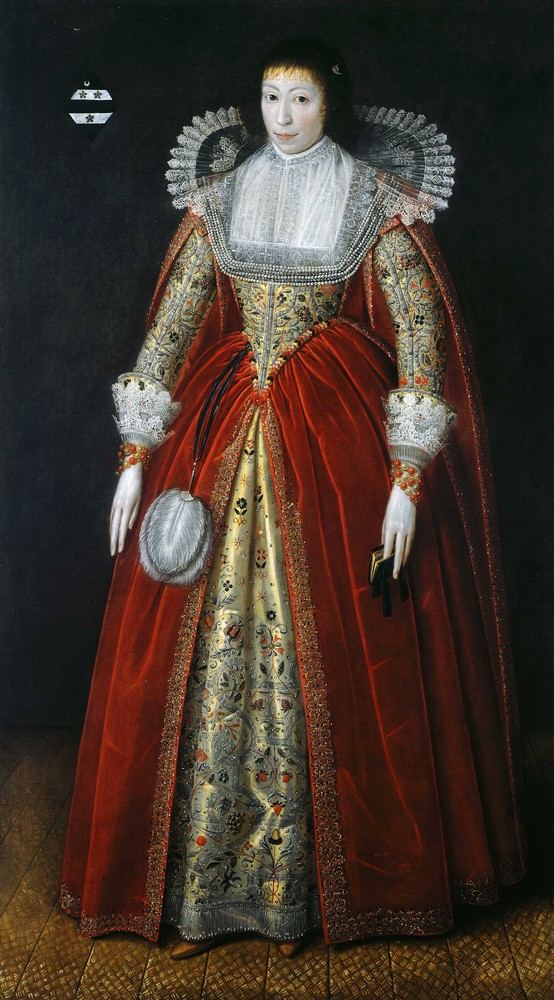
8 c. 1620
1. Hilliard's Unknown Woman of 1602 wears typical Puritan fashion of the early years of the century. Her tall black felt hat with a rounded crown is called a capotain and is worn over a linen cap. She wears a black dress and a white stomacher over a chemise with blackwork embroidery trim; her neckline is filled in with a linen partlet.
2. Anne of Denmark wears a bodice with a low, round neckline and tight sleeve, with a matching petticoat pinned into flounces on a drum or cartwheel farthingale, 1605. The high-fronted hairstyle was briefly fashionable. The jewels of Anne of Denmark are well-documented and depicted in her portraits.
3. Isabella Clara Eugenia of Spain, Regent of the Netherlands, wears a cartwheel ruff and wide, flat ruffles at her wrists. Her split-sleeved dress in the Spanish fashion is trimmed with wide bands of braid or fabric, 1609.
4. Mary Radclyffe in the very low rounded neckline and closed cartwheel ruff of c.1610. The black silk strings on her jewelry were a passing fashion.
5. Anne of Denmark wears mourning for her son, Henry, Prince of Wales, 1612. She wears a black wired cap and black lace.
6. An Englishwoman (traditionally called Dorothy Cary, Later Viscountess Rochford) wears an embroidered linen jacket with ribbon ties and embroidered petticoat under a black dress with hanging sleeves lined in gray. Her reticella lace collar, cuffs, and hood are tinted with yellow starch.
7. Frans Hals' young woman wears a chain girdle over her black vlieger open-fronted gown, reserved for married women, and an elongated bodice with matching tight sleeves and petticoat. She is wearing a padded roll to hold her skirt in the fashionable shape. Dutch, 1618–20.
8. Elizabeth, Lady Style of Wateringbury wears an embroidered jacket-bodice and petticoat under a red velvet dress. She wears a sheer partlet over an embroidered high-necked chemise, c. 1620.

=== Style gallery 1620s ===
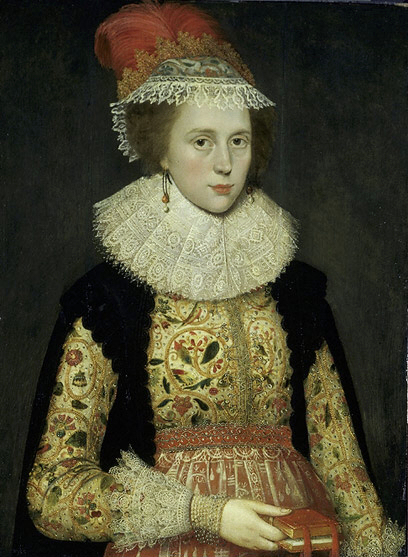
1 – c. 1620

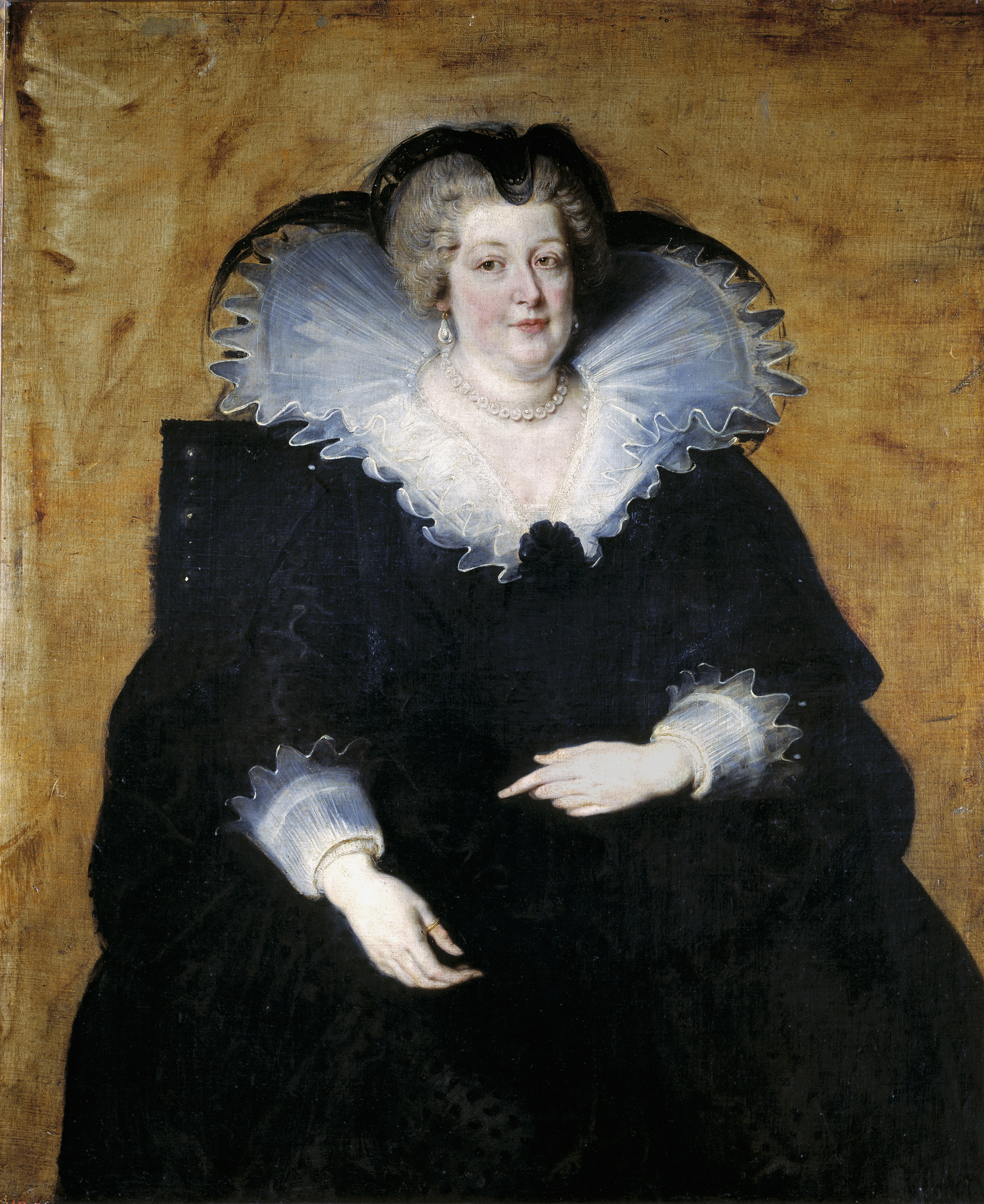
2 – 1620–21

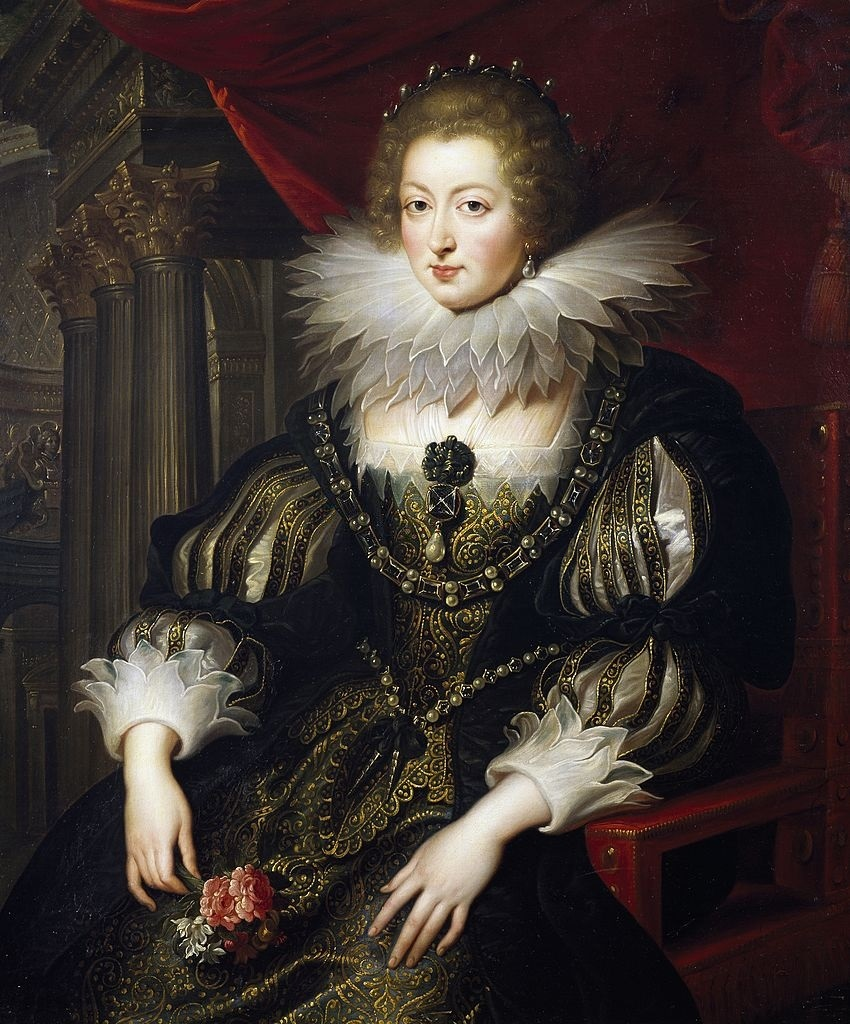
3 – 1620s

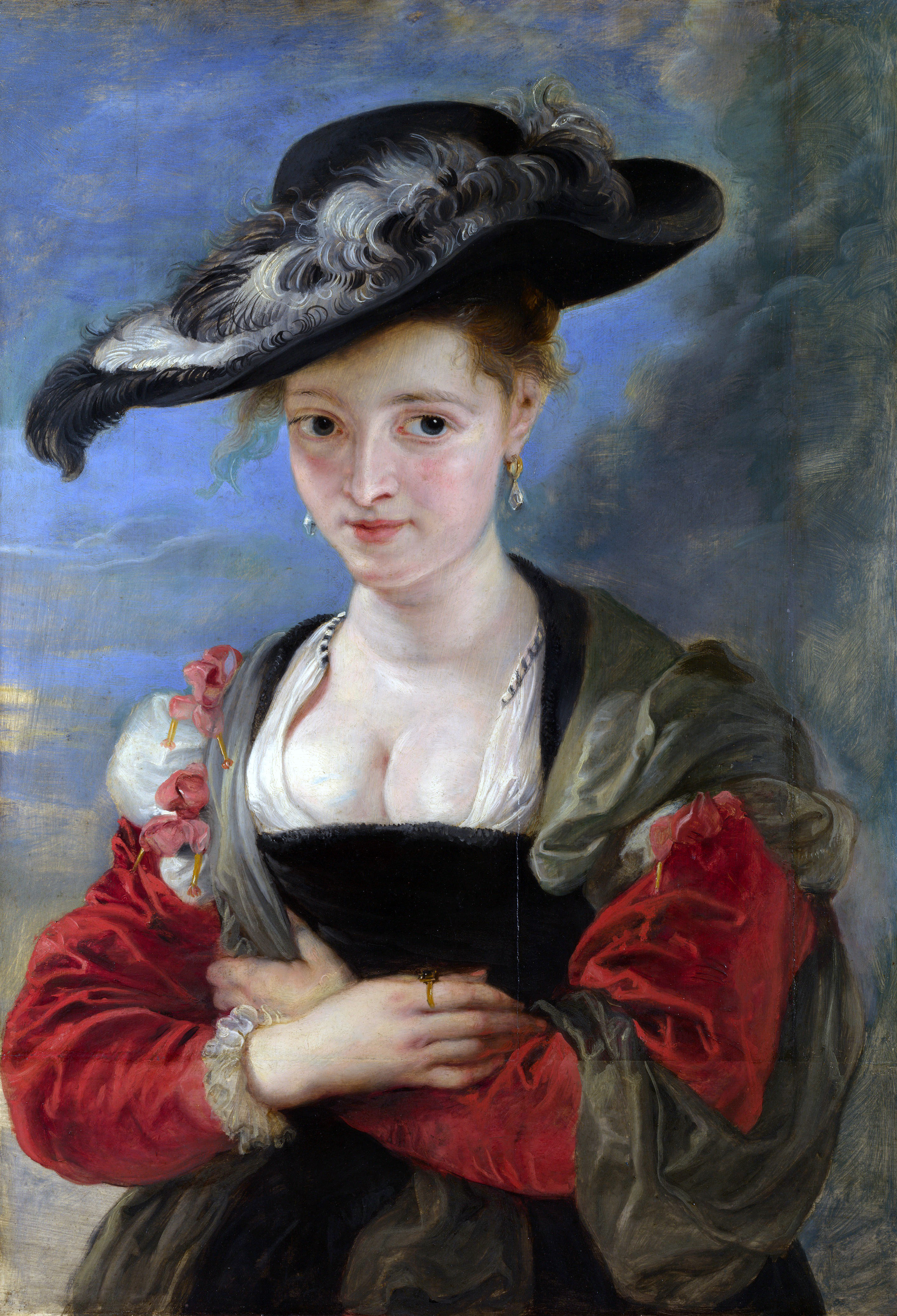
4 – 1625

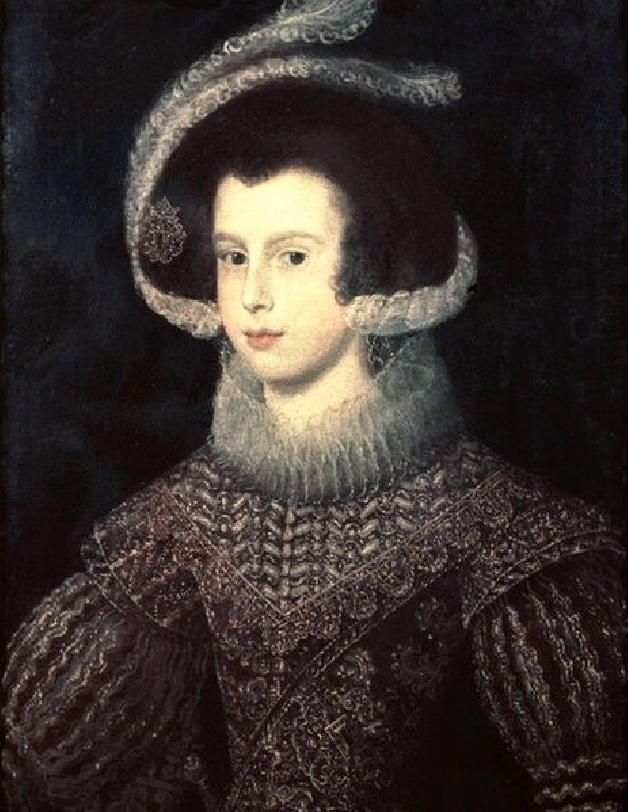
5 – 1623–26

6 – 1623–26

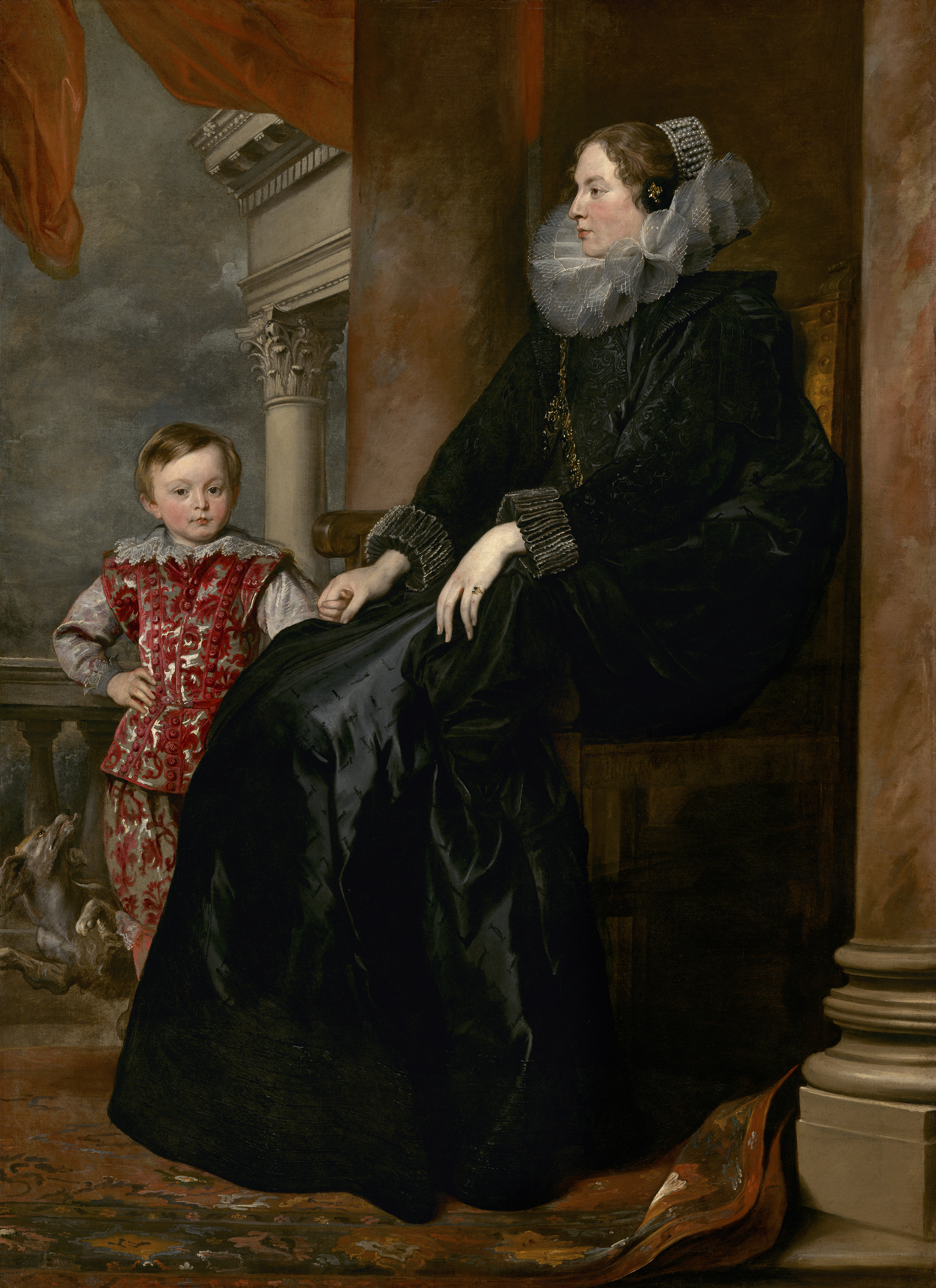
7 – c. 1626

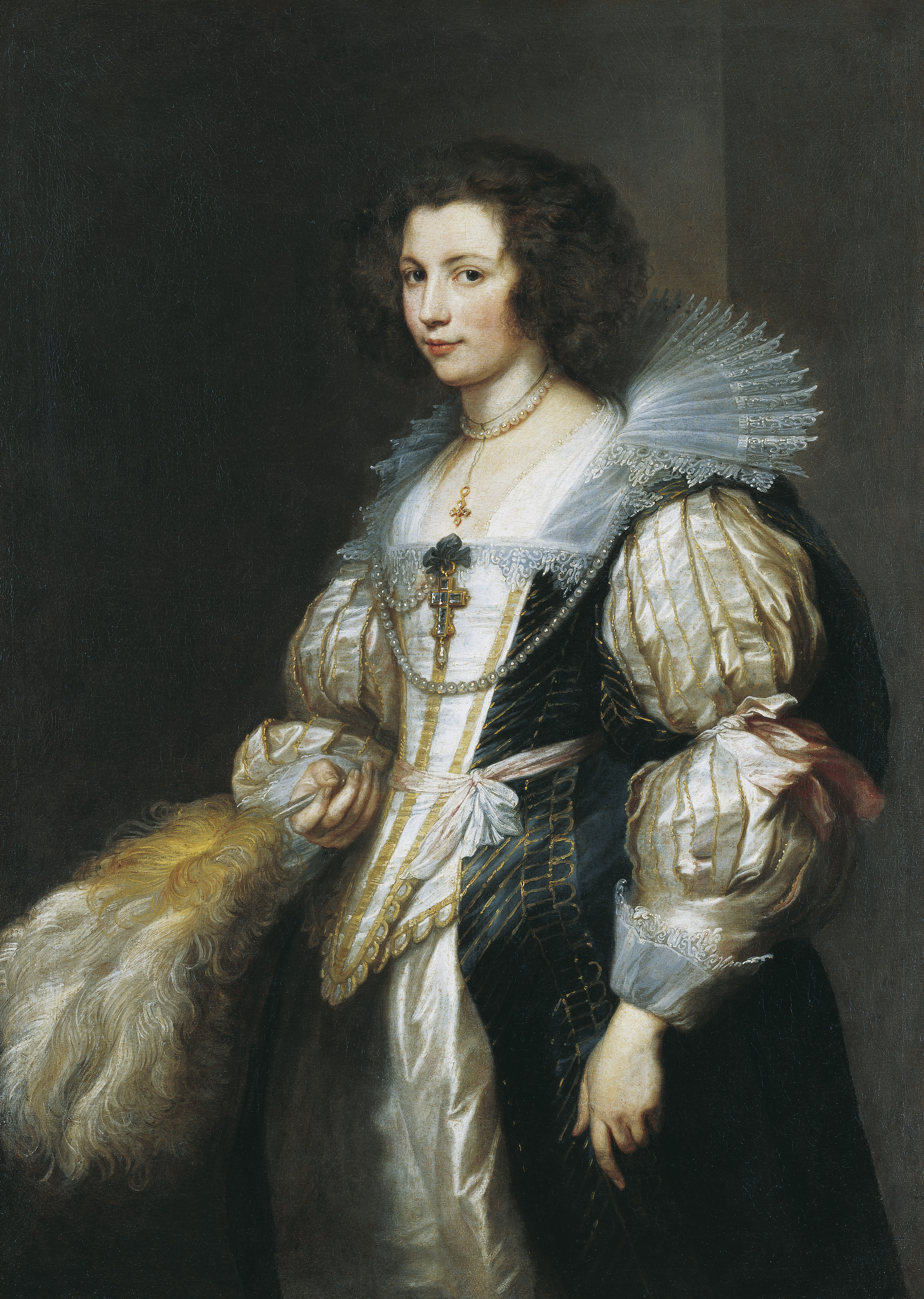
8 – c. 1629–30
1. Margaret Laton wears a black gown over an embroidered linen jacket tucked into the newly fashionable high-waisted petticoat of c. 1620. She wears a sheer apron or overskirt, a falling ruff, and an embroidered cap with lace trim. The jacket itself is in the longer fashion of the previous decade.
2. Marie de' Medici in widowhood wears black with a black wired cap and veil, c. 1620–21.
3. Anne of Austria, Queen of France, wears an open bodice over a stomacher and virago sleeves, with a closed ruff. Note looser cuffs. C. 1621–25.
4. Susanna Fourment wears an open high-necked chemise, red sleeves tied on with ribbon points, and a broad-brimmed hat with plumes, 1625.
5. Élisabeth de France, Queen of Spain, wears her hair in a popular style at the Spanish court, c. 1625.
6. Isabella Brandt wears a black gown over a gold bodice and sleeves and a striped petticoat, 1623–26.
7. Paola Adorno, Marchesa Brinole-Sale wears a black gown and a sheer ruff with large, soft figure-of-eight pleats seen in Italian portraits of this period. Her hair is caught in a cylindrical cap or caul of pearls. Genoa, c. 1626.
8. Marie-Louise de Tassis wears a short-waisted gown with a sash over a tabbed bodice with a long stomacher and matching petticoat and virago sleeves, c. 1629–30.

=== Style gallery 1630s ===
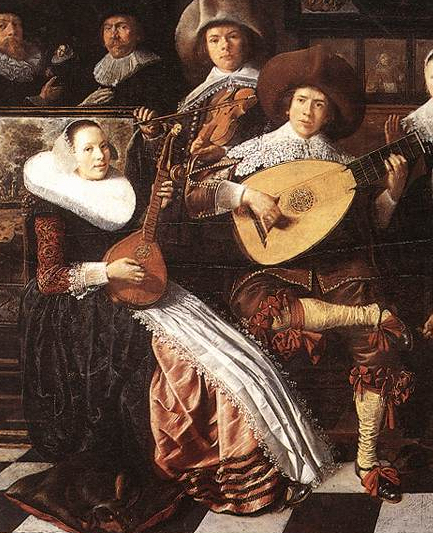
1 – 1630

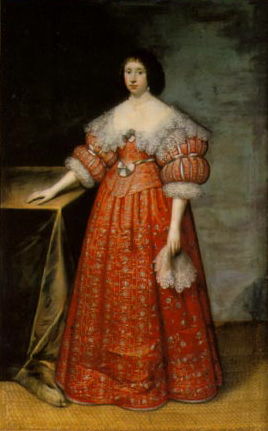
2 – 1630

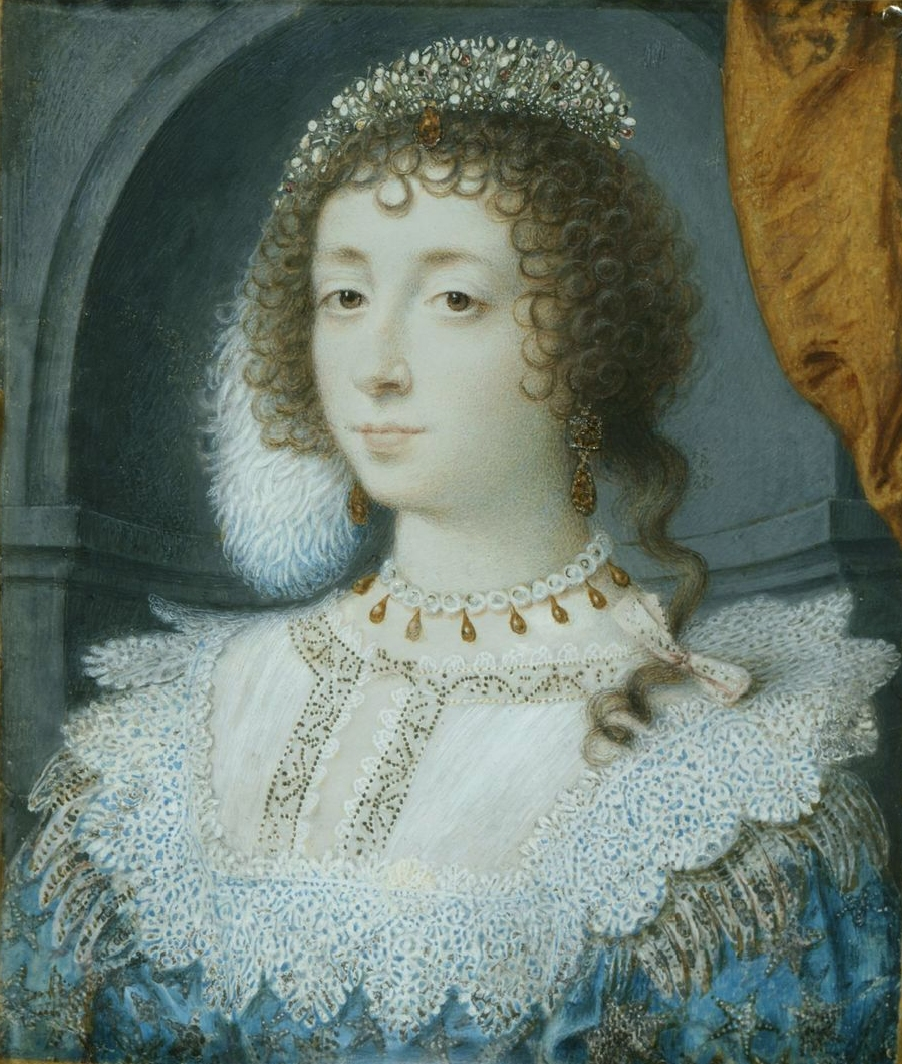
3 – c. 1632

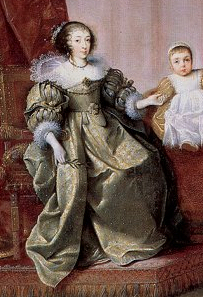
4 – 1632

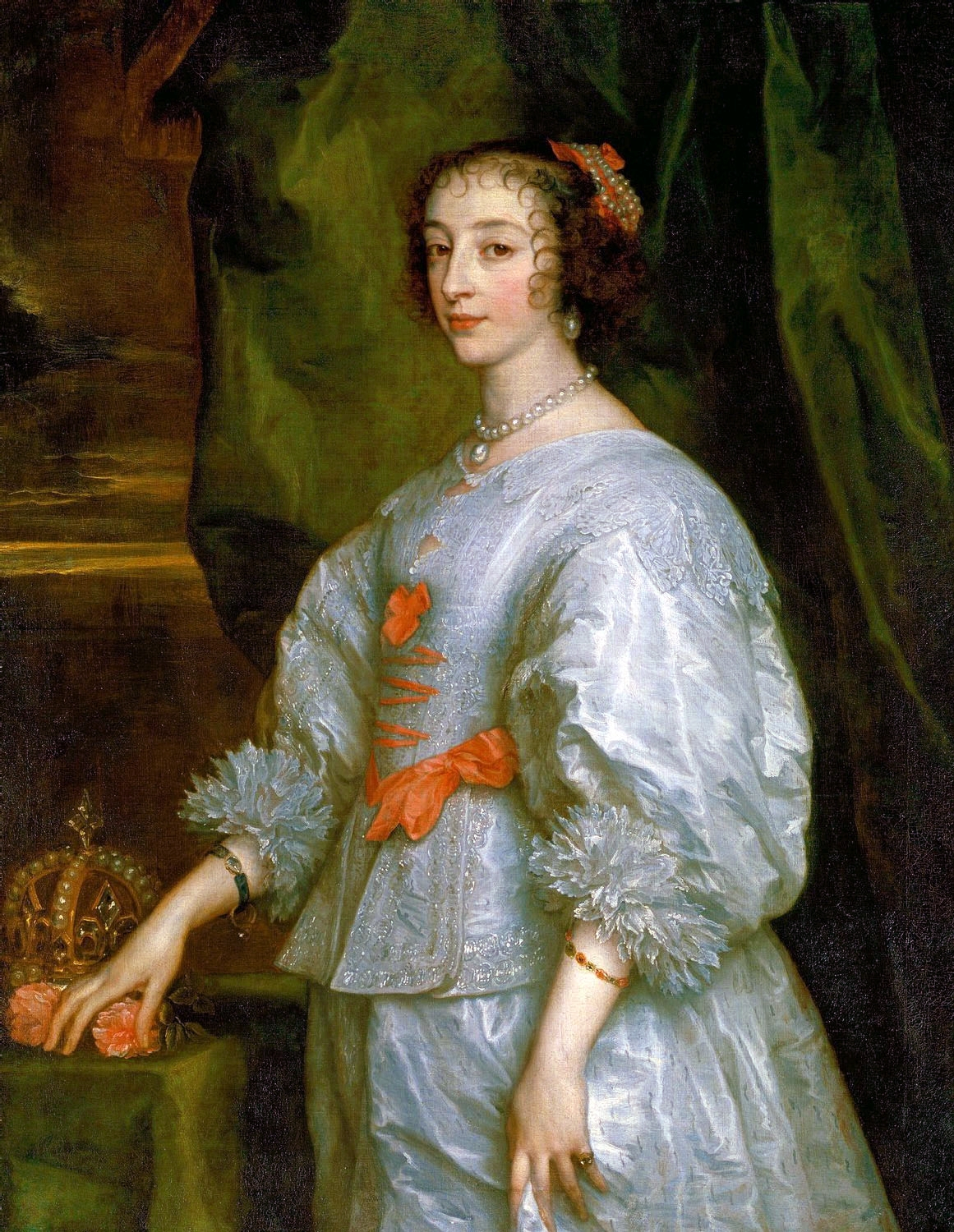
5 – 1632

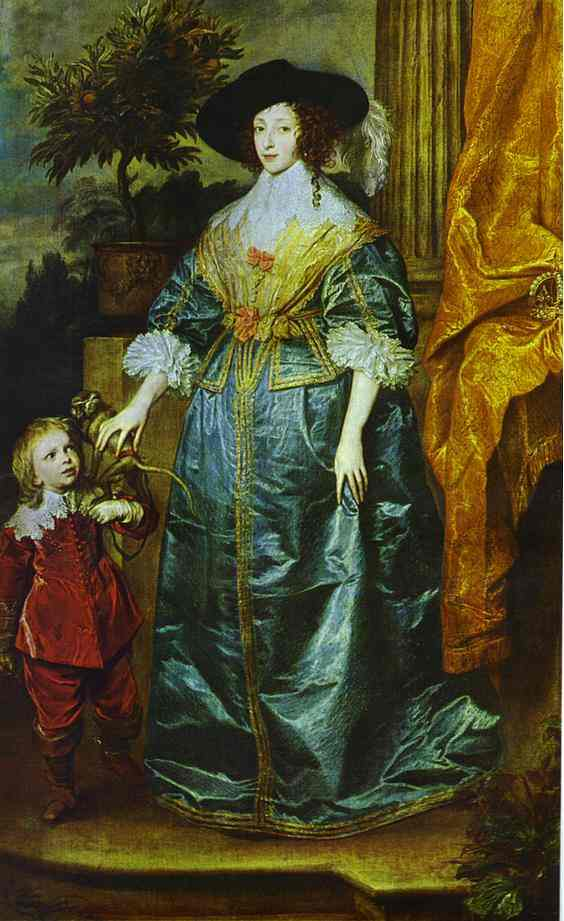
6 – 1633

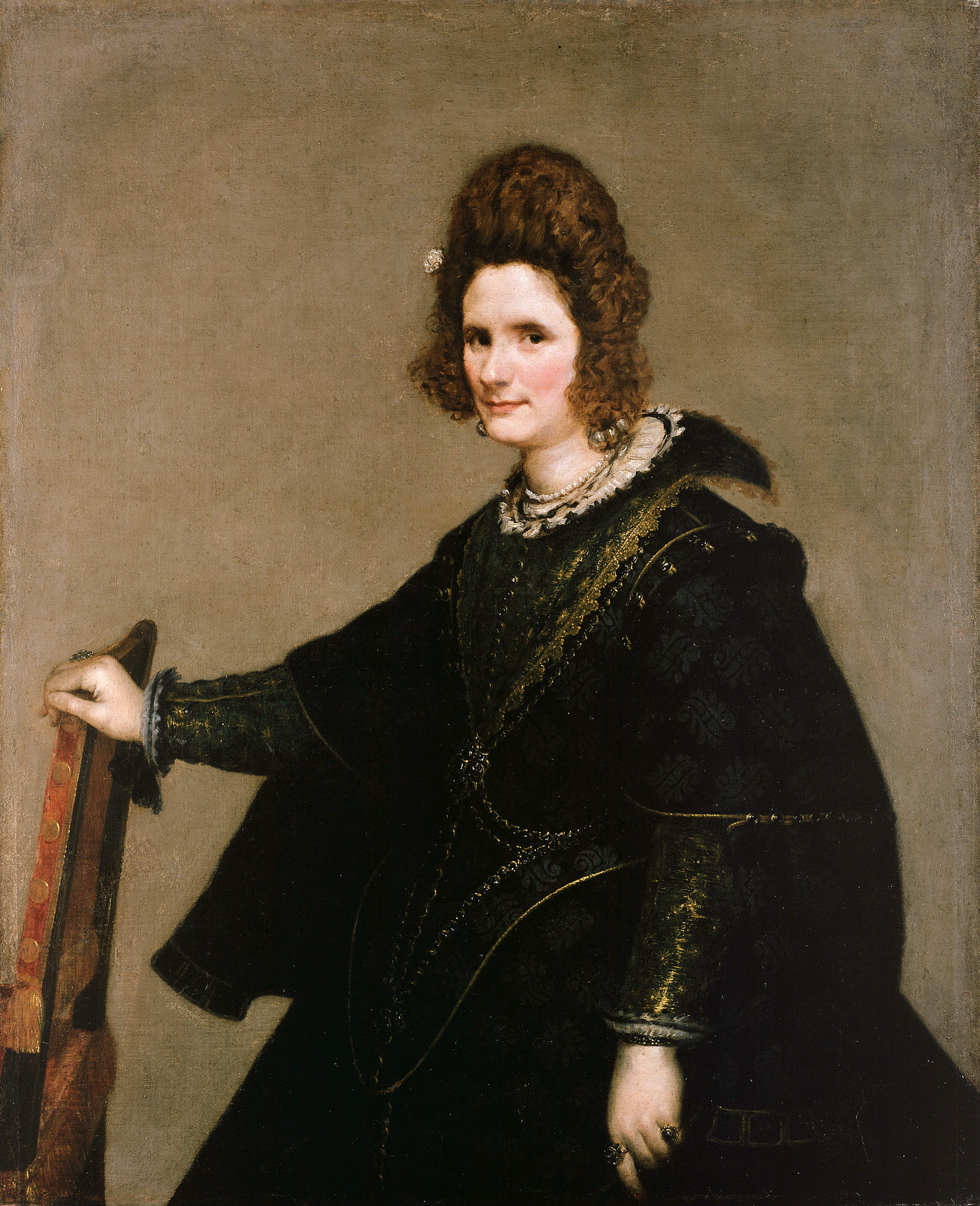
7 – 1635

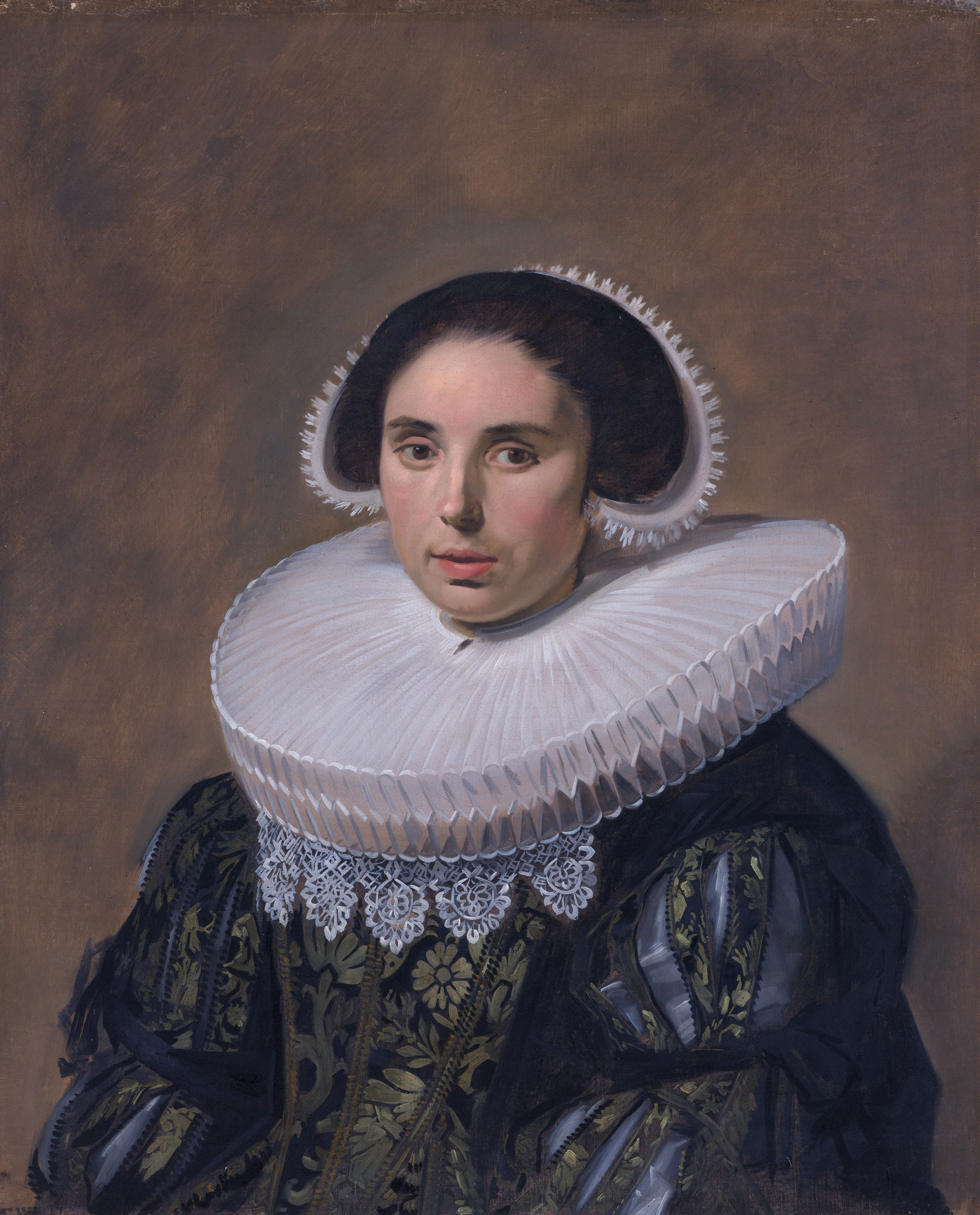
8 – 1635

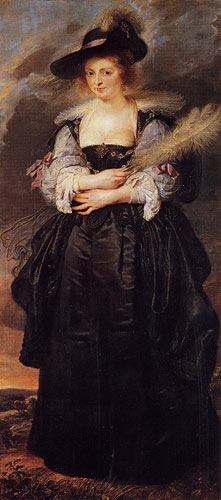
9 – 1638
1. Large ruffs remained part of Dutch fashion long after they had disappeared in France and England. The dark gown has short puffed sleeves and is worn over tight undersleeves and a pink petticoat trimmed with rows of braid at the hem. The lace-edged apron shows creases from starching and ironing, 1630.
2. Portrait of an unknown woman wearing the informal English fashion of a brightly coloured bodice and petticoat without an overgown. Her bodice has deep tabs at the waist and virago sleeves, 1630.
3. Henrietta Maria as Divine Beauty in the masque Tempe Restored wears a high-necked chemise, a lace collar, and a jeweled cap with a feather, 1632. Masquing costumes such as this one, designed by Inigo Jones, are often seen in portraits of this period.
4. Henrietta Maria wears the formal English court costume of a gown with short open sleeves over a matching bodice with virago sleeves and a simple petticoat, 1632.
5. Henrietta Maria wears a white satin tabbed bodice with full sleeves trimmed with silver braid or lace and a matching petticoat. Her bodice is laced up with a coral ribbon over a stomacher. A matching ribbon is set in a V-shape at her front waist and tied in a bow to one side. She wears a lace-trimmed smock or partlet with a broad, square collar. A ribbon and a string of pearls decorate her hair, 1632.
6. Henrietta Maria's riding costume consists of a jacket-bodice of blue satin with long tabbed skirts and a matching long petticoat. She wears a broad-brimmed hat with ostrich plumes, 1633.
7. A Lady from Spanish court wears an elegant, black dress. Its simplicity is a testament to the austerity of the Spanish court; however, her high hair is quite fashionable, as well as the mass of curls on both sides of her face c. 1635.
8. Sara Wolphaerts van Diemen wears a double cartwheel ruff that remained popular in the Netherlands through the period. She wears a black gown with a brocaded stomacher and virago sleeves, and a white linen cap, 1635.
9. Helena Fourment wears a black robe, bodice, and petticoat worn with an open-necked chemise with a broad, starched lace collar, gray satin sleeves tied with rose-coloured ribbons, and a broad-brimmed black hat cocked up on one side and decorated with a hatband and plumes, 1638.

=== Style gallery 1640s ===
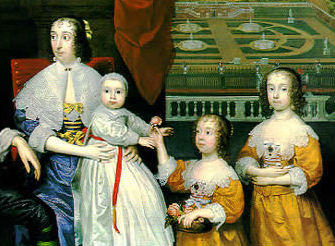
1 – 1640

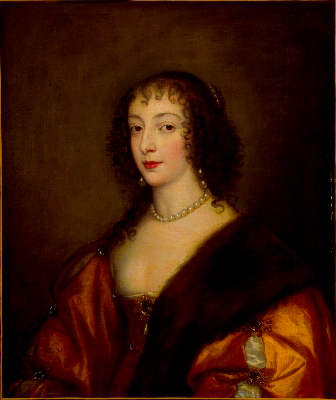
2 – c. 1640

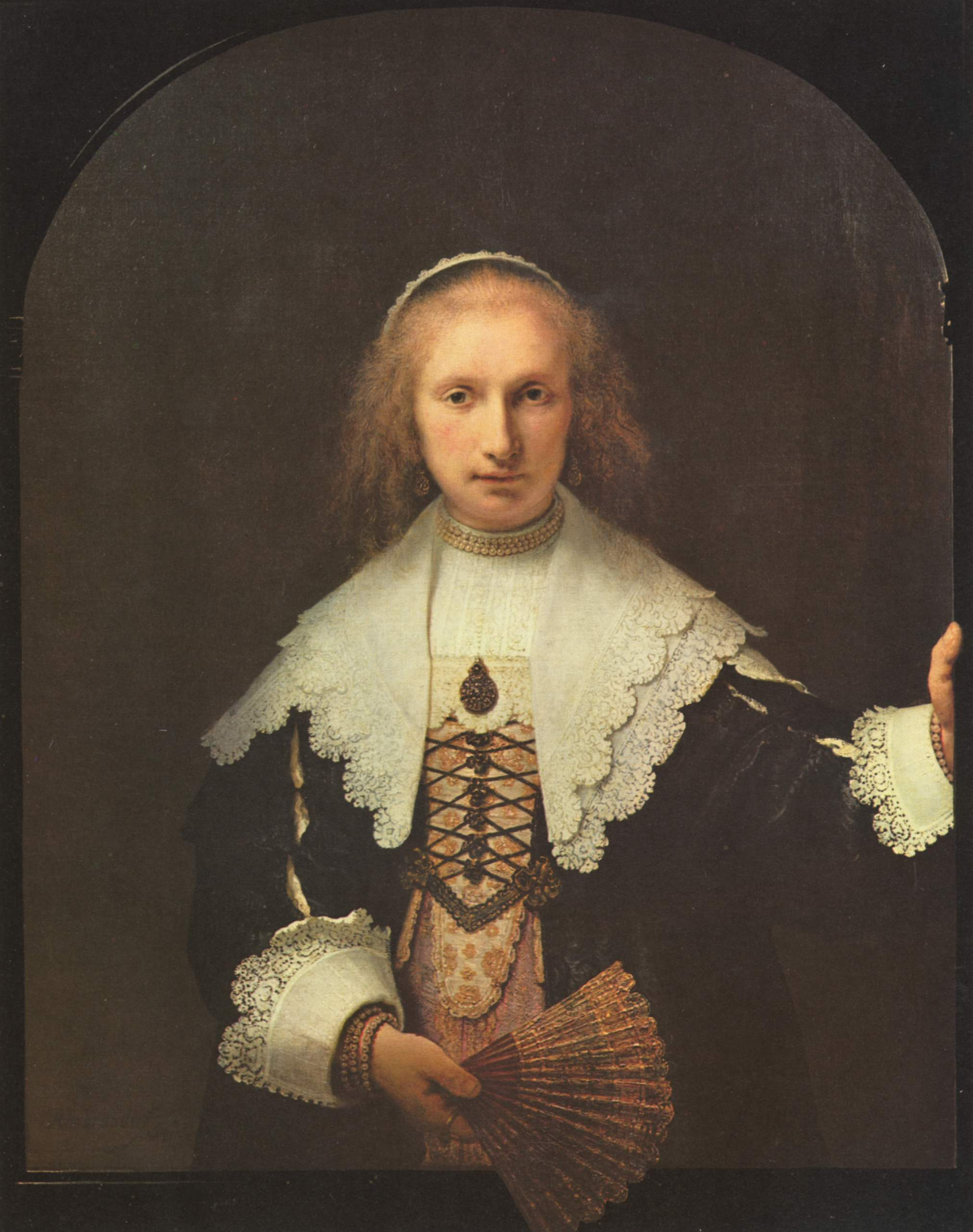
3 – 1641

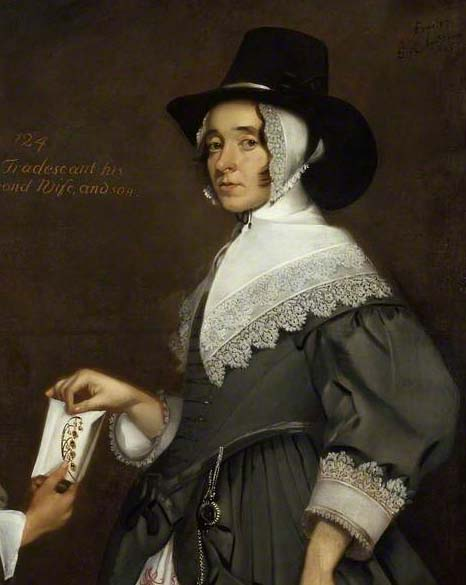
4 – 1640s

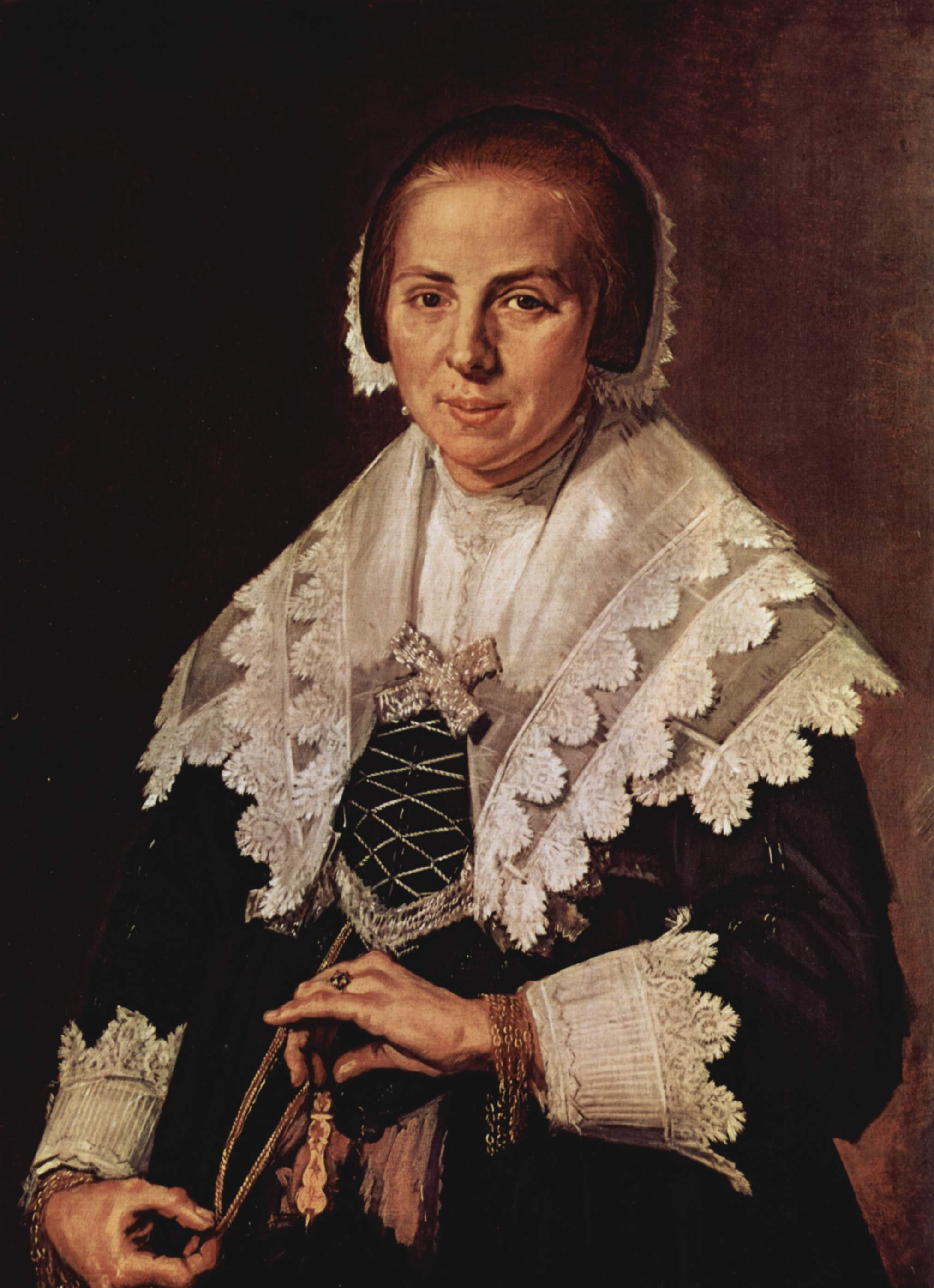
5 – 1643

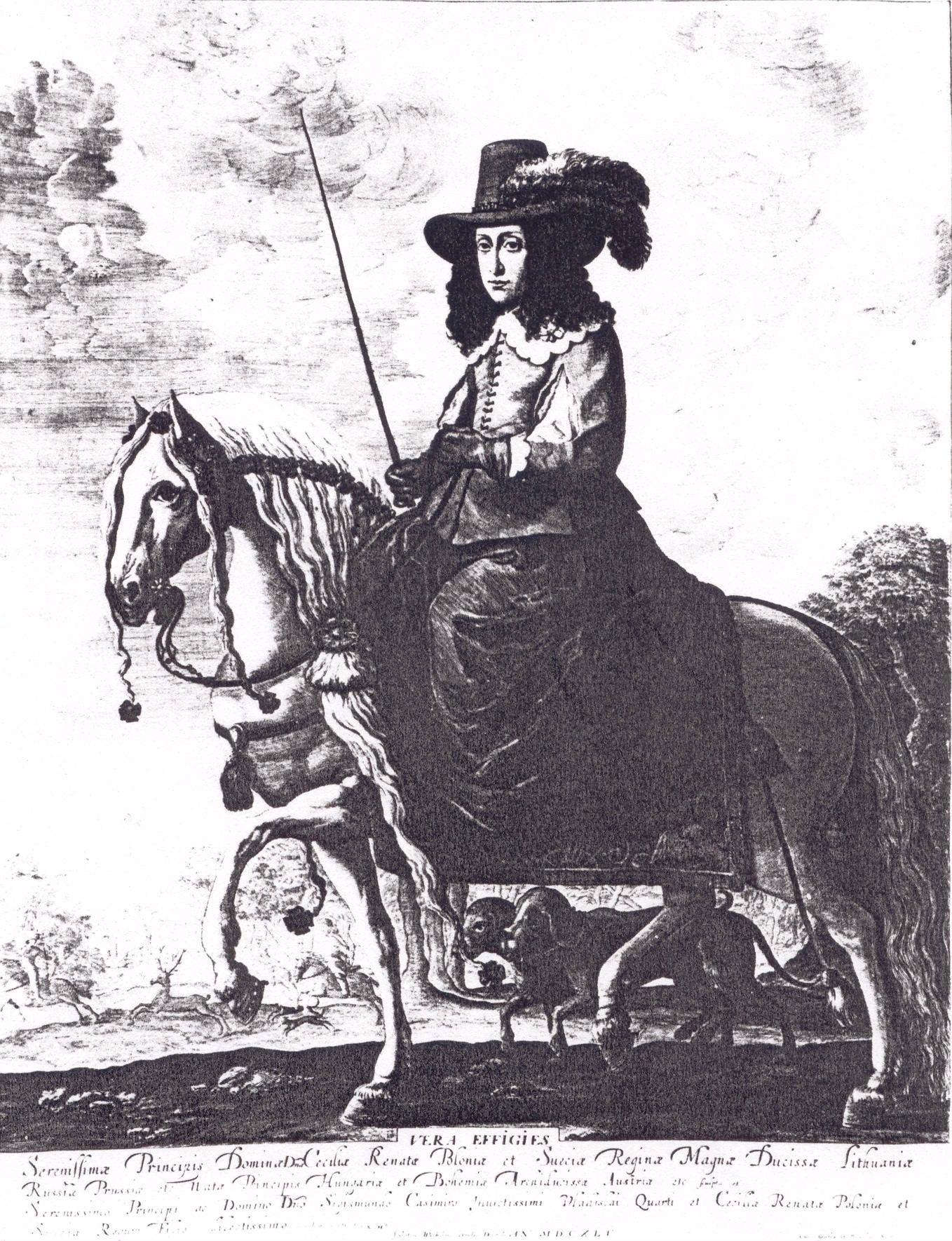
6 - 1645

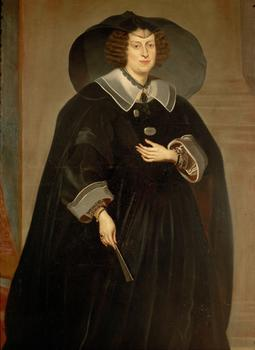
7 - c. 1648

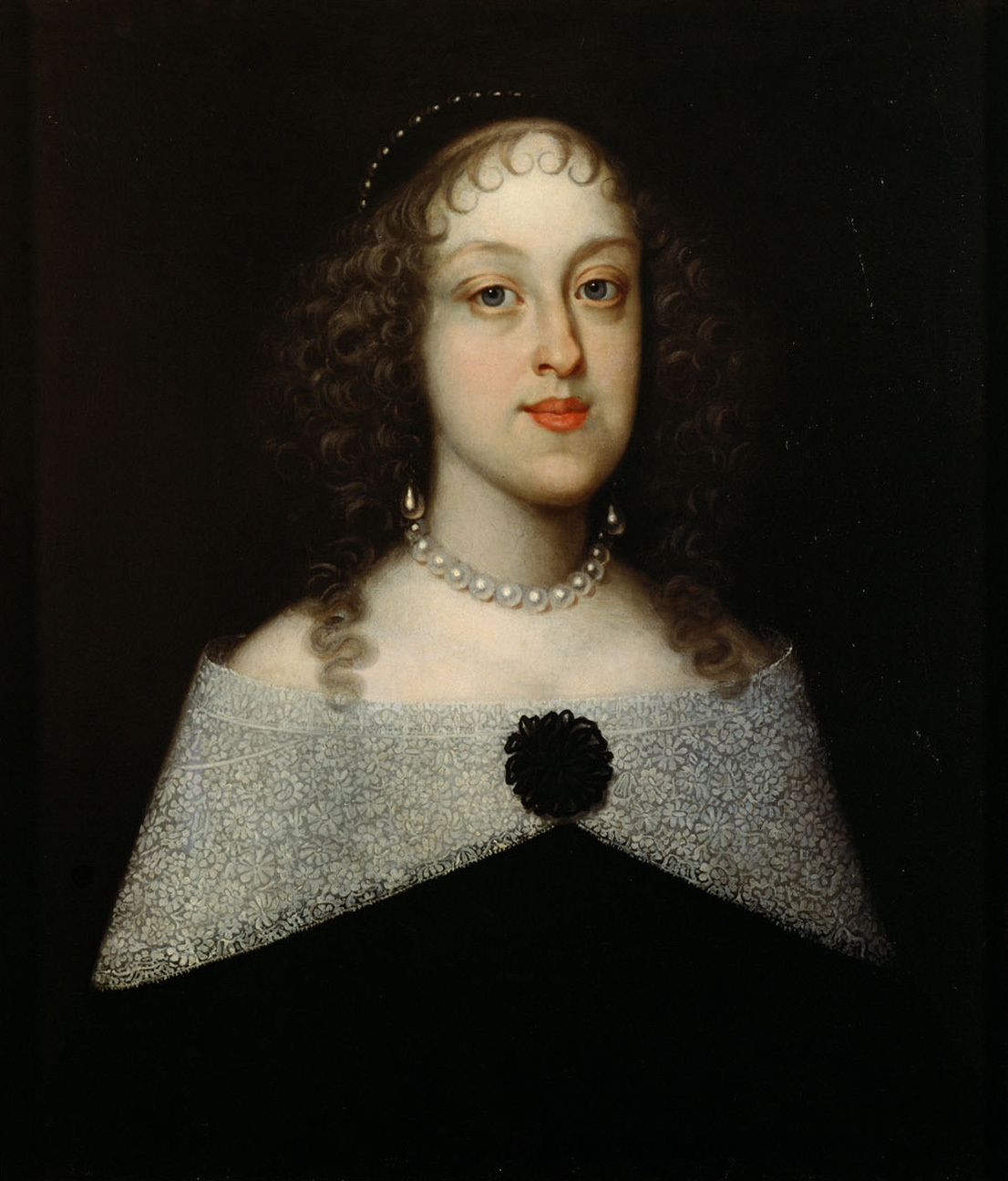
8 - c. 1648

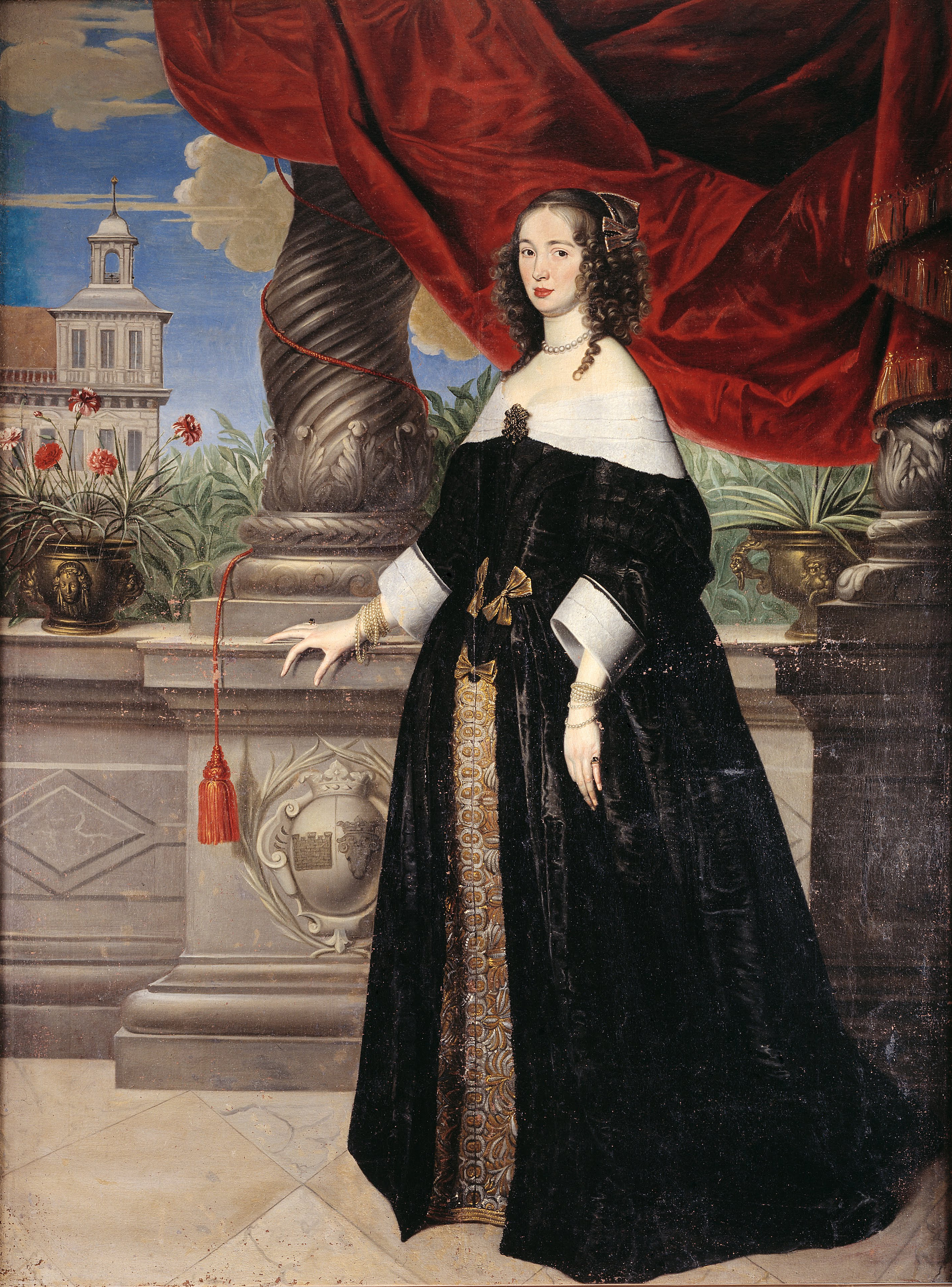
9 - 1649
1. Elizabeth, Lady Capel wears a bright blue bodice and petticoat with yellow ribbons and a lace-trimmed kerchief pinned at her neck. Her daughters Mary and Elizabeth wear gold-coloured bodices and petticoats, 1640.
2. Portrait of Henrietta Maria in the style of Van Dyck shows her in a flame-colored satin gown without a collar or kerchief. She wears a fur piece draped over her shoulder, 1640.
3. Agatha Bas wears a pointed stomacher under a front-lacing, high-waisted black gown. Her matching linen kerchief, collar and cuffs are trimmed with lace, and she wears a high-necked chemise or partlet, the Netherlands, 1641.
4. Hester Tradescant's costume is trimmed in lace in keeping with her station, but she wears the closed linen cap or coif, tall hat, unrevealing neckline, and sober colours favoured by Puritans, c. 1645. Her long-fronted bodice and open skirt are conservative fashions at this date.
5. Dutch fashions of the 1640s feature modest, high-necked chemises, broad linen collars with matching kerchiefs and deep cuffs, and lavish use of bobbin lace.
6. Engraving of Cecylia Renata, Queen of Poland in riding dress (doublet, skirt, and hat), 1645.
7. Claudia de' Medici as a widow, in mourning dress (black cap, veil, and cloak) c. 1648.
8. Archduchess Isabella Klara wears her lace collar or tucker off-the-shoulderGerman-Swedish noblewomanAnna Margareta von Haugwitz.

== Men's fashions ==
=== Shirts, doublets, and jerkins ===
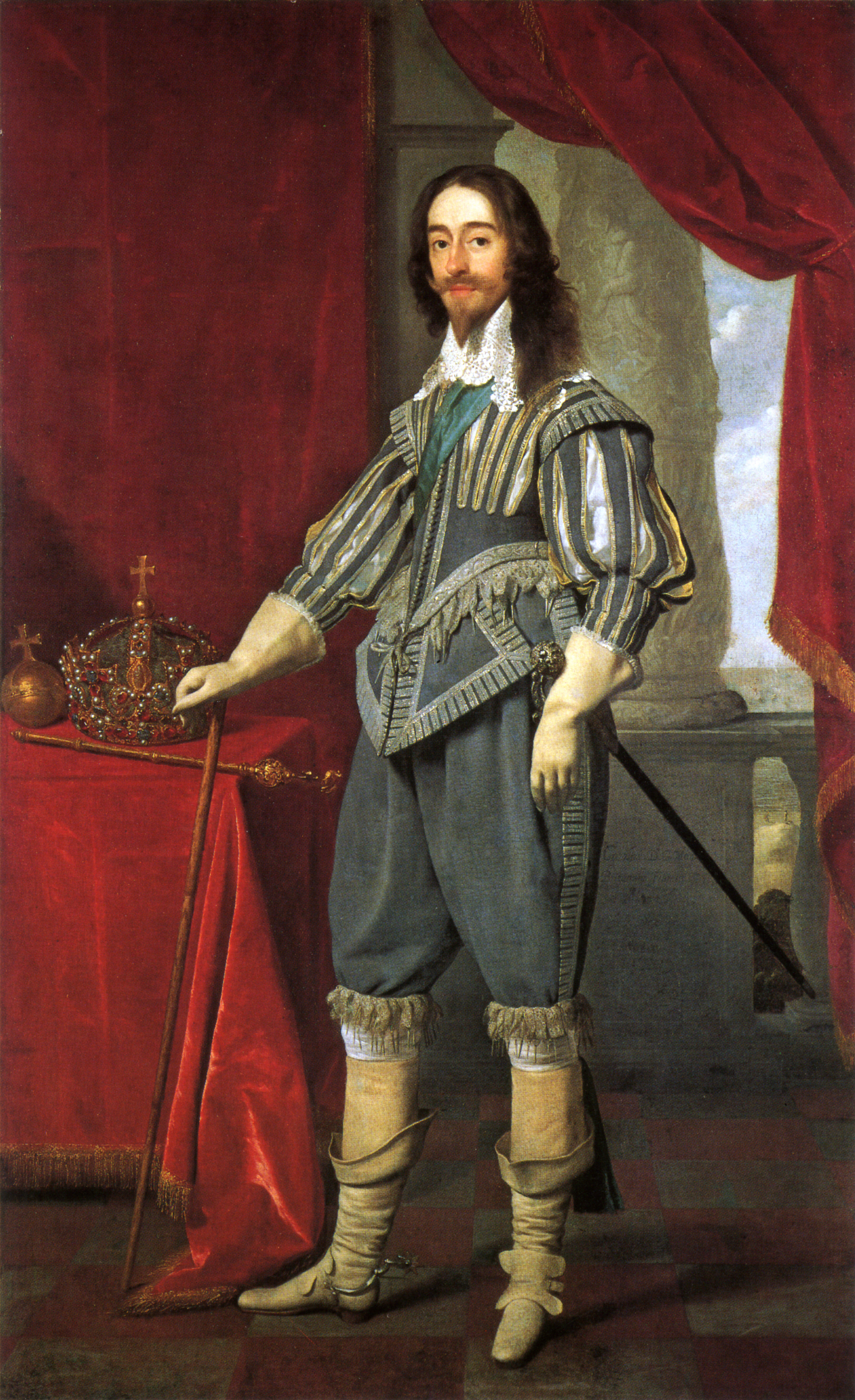
Charles I wears a slashed doublet with paned sleeves, breeches, and tall narrow boots with turned-over tops, 1631.

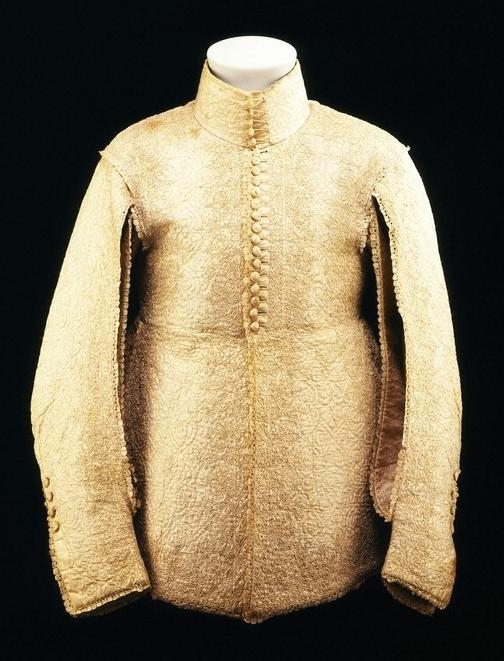
Doublet of embroidered glazed linen, 1635–40, V&A Museum no. 177–1900.

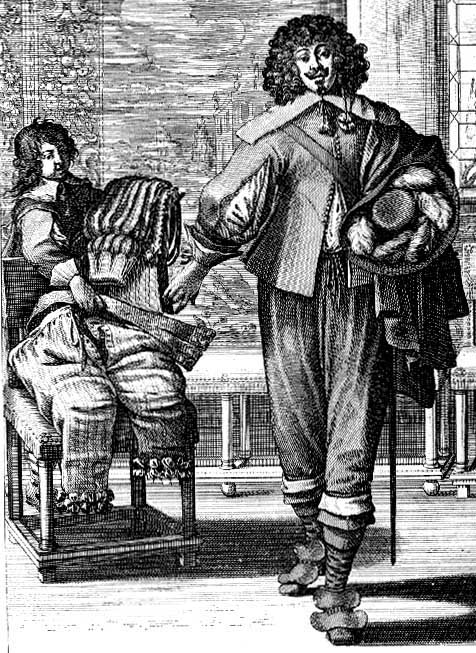
The result of the Edict of 1633: the French courtier abandons his paned sleeves and ribbons for plainer styles. He has a lovelock, in his hair which can be seen hanging in front of his left shoulder.

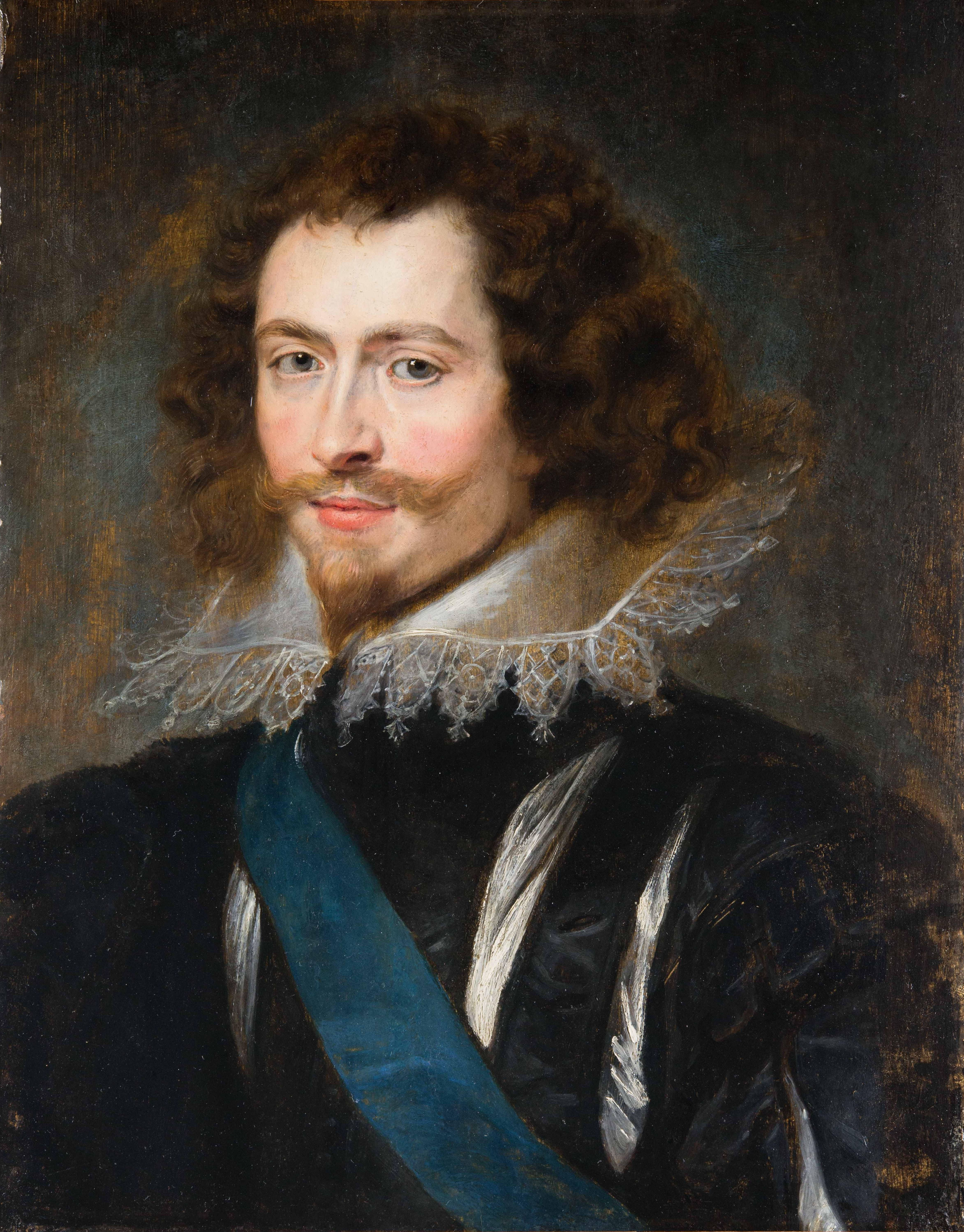
The Duke of Buckingham wears a wired collar with lace trim and a slashed doublet and sleeves. His hair falls in loose curls to his collar, c. 1625.

Linen shirts had deep cuffs. Shirt sleeves became fuller throughout the period. To the 1620s, a collar wired to stick out horizontally, called a whisk, was popular. Other styles included an unstarched ruff-like collar and, later, a rectangular falling band lying on the shoulders. Pointed Van Dyke beards, named after the painter Anthony van Dyck, were fashionable, and men often grew a large, wide moustache, as well. Doublets were pointed and fitted close to the body, with tight sleeves, to about 1615. Gradually waistlines rose and sleeves became fuller, and both body and upper sleeves might be slashed to show the shirt beneath. By 1640, doublets were full and unfitted, and might be open at the front below the high waist to show the shirt.

Sleeveless leather jerkins were worn by soldiers and are seen in portraits, but otherwise the jerkin rapidly fell out of fashion for indoor wear.

=== Hose and breeches ===
G Paned or pansied trunk hose or round hose, padded hose with strips of fabric (panes) over a full inner layer or lining, were worn early in the period, over cannions, fitted hose that ended above the knee. Trunk hose were longer than in the previous period, and were pear-shaped, with less fullness at the waist and more at mid-thigh.

Slops or galligaskins, loose hose reaching just below the knee, replaced all other styles of hose by the 1620s, and were now generally called breeches. Breeches might be fastened up the outer leg with buttons or buckles over a full lining.

From 1600 to c. 1630, hose or breeches were fastened to doublets by means of ties or points, short laces or ribbons pulled through matching sets of worked eyelets. Points were tied in bows at the waist and became more elaborate until they disappeared with the very short waisted doublets of the late 1630s. Decorated metal tips on points were called aiguillettes or aiglets, and those of the wealthy were made of precious metals set with pearls and other gemstones.

Spanish breeches, rather stiff ungathered breeches, were also popular throughout the era.

=== Outerwear ===
Gowns were worn early in the period, but fell out of fashion in the 1620s.

Short cloaks or capes, usually hip-length, often with sleeves, were worn by fashionable men, usually slung artistically over the left shoulder, even indoors; a fashion of the 1630s matched the cape fabric to the breeches and its lining to the doublet. Long cloaks were worn for inclement weather.

=== Hairstyles and Headgear ===
Early in the period, hair was worn collar-length and brushed back from the forehead; very fashionable men wore a single long strand of hair called a lovelock over one shoulder. Hairstyles grew longer through the period, and long curls were fashionable by the late 1630s and 1640s, pointing toward the ascendance of the wig as the standard wardrobe in the 1660s. King Louis XIII (1601–1643) started to pioneer wig-wearing during this period in 1624 when he had prematurely begun to bald.

Pointed beards and wide mustaches were fashionable.

To about 1620, the fashionable hat was the capotain, with a tall conical crown rounded at the top and a narrow brim. By the 1630s, the crown was shorter and the brim was wider, often worn cocked or pinned up on one side and decorated with a mass of ostrich plumes.

Close-fitting caps called coifs or biggins were worn only by young children and old men under their hats or alone indoors.

=== Style gallery 1600s–1620s ===
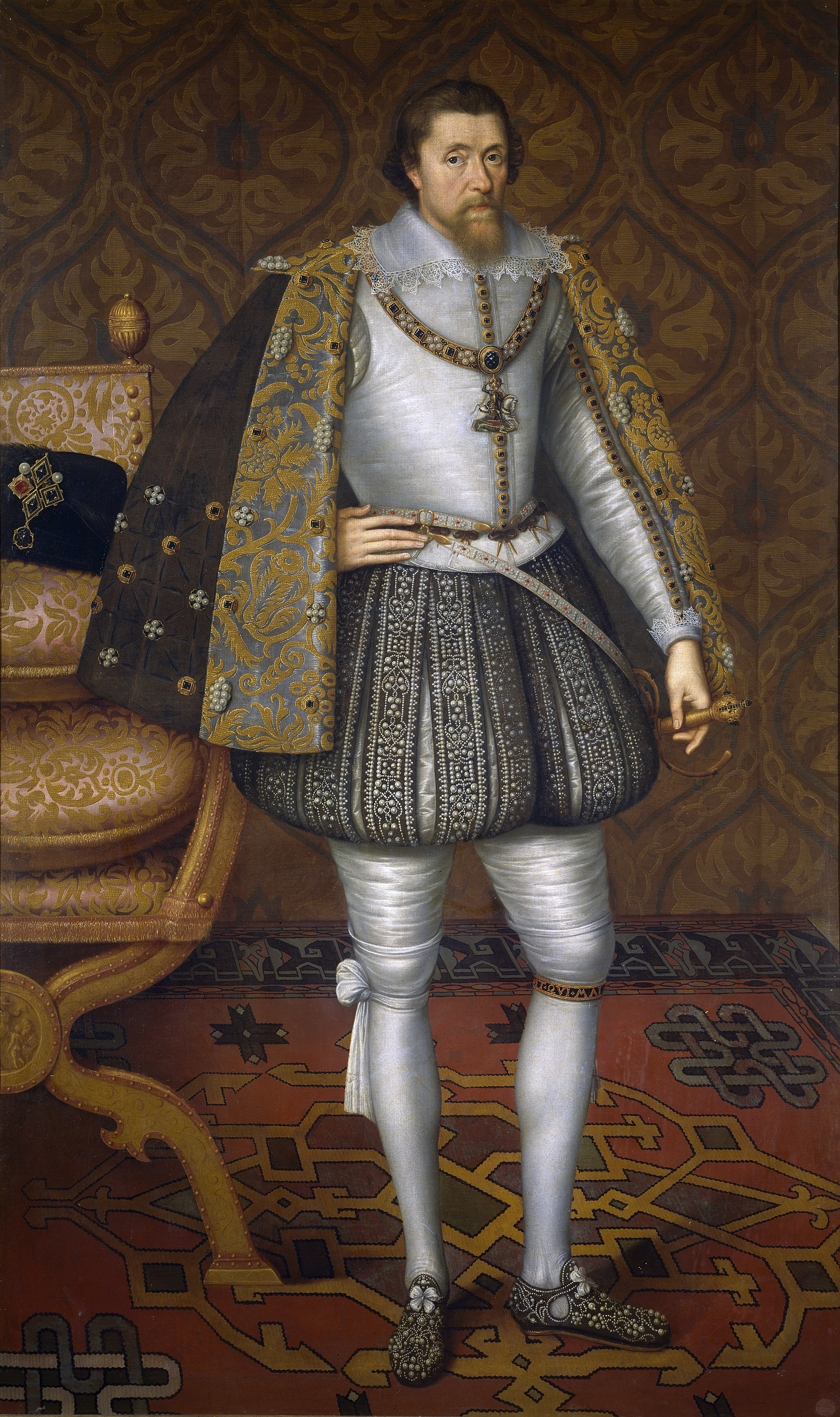
1 – 1603–10

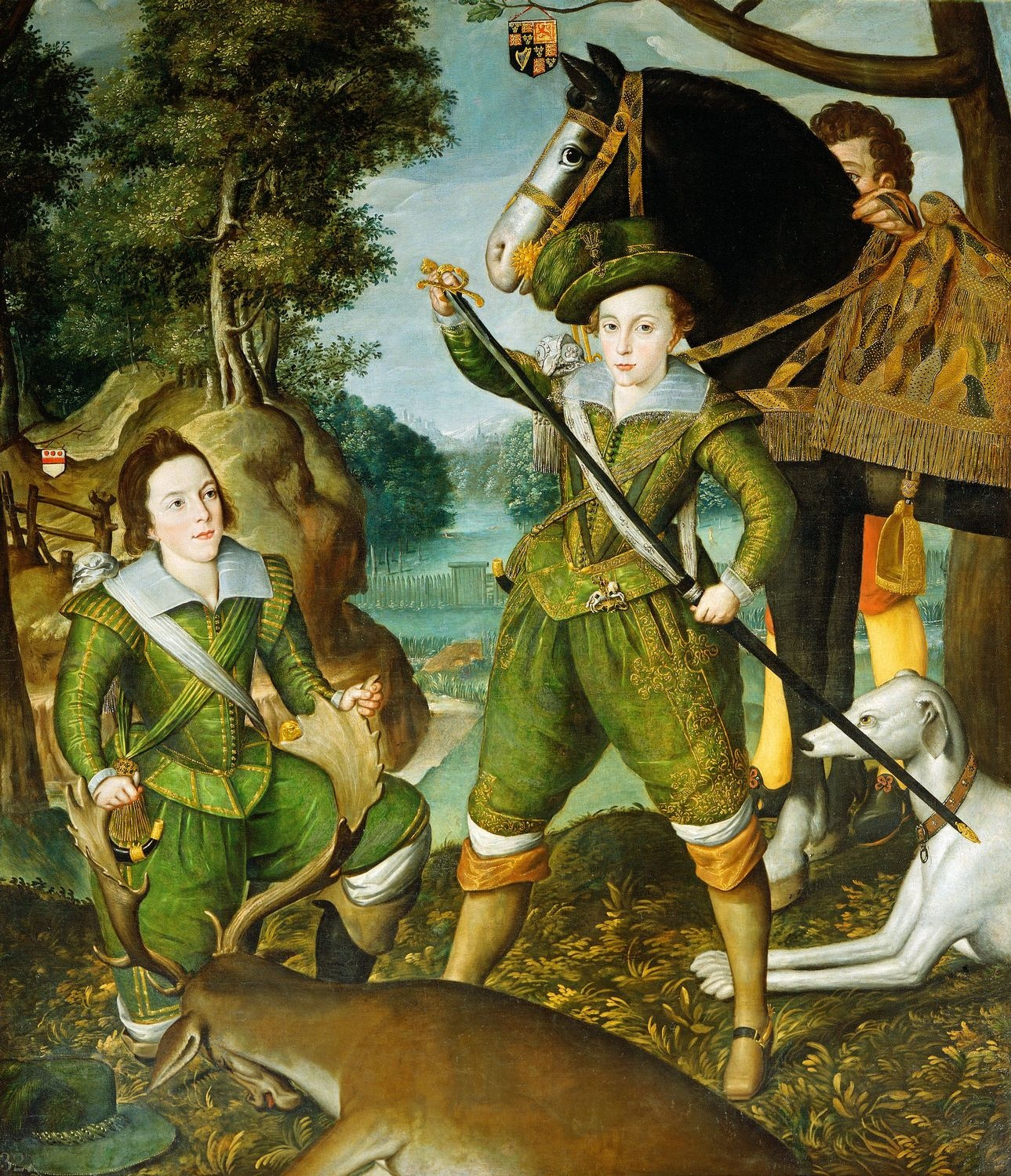
2 – 1606–09

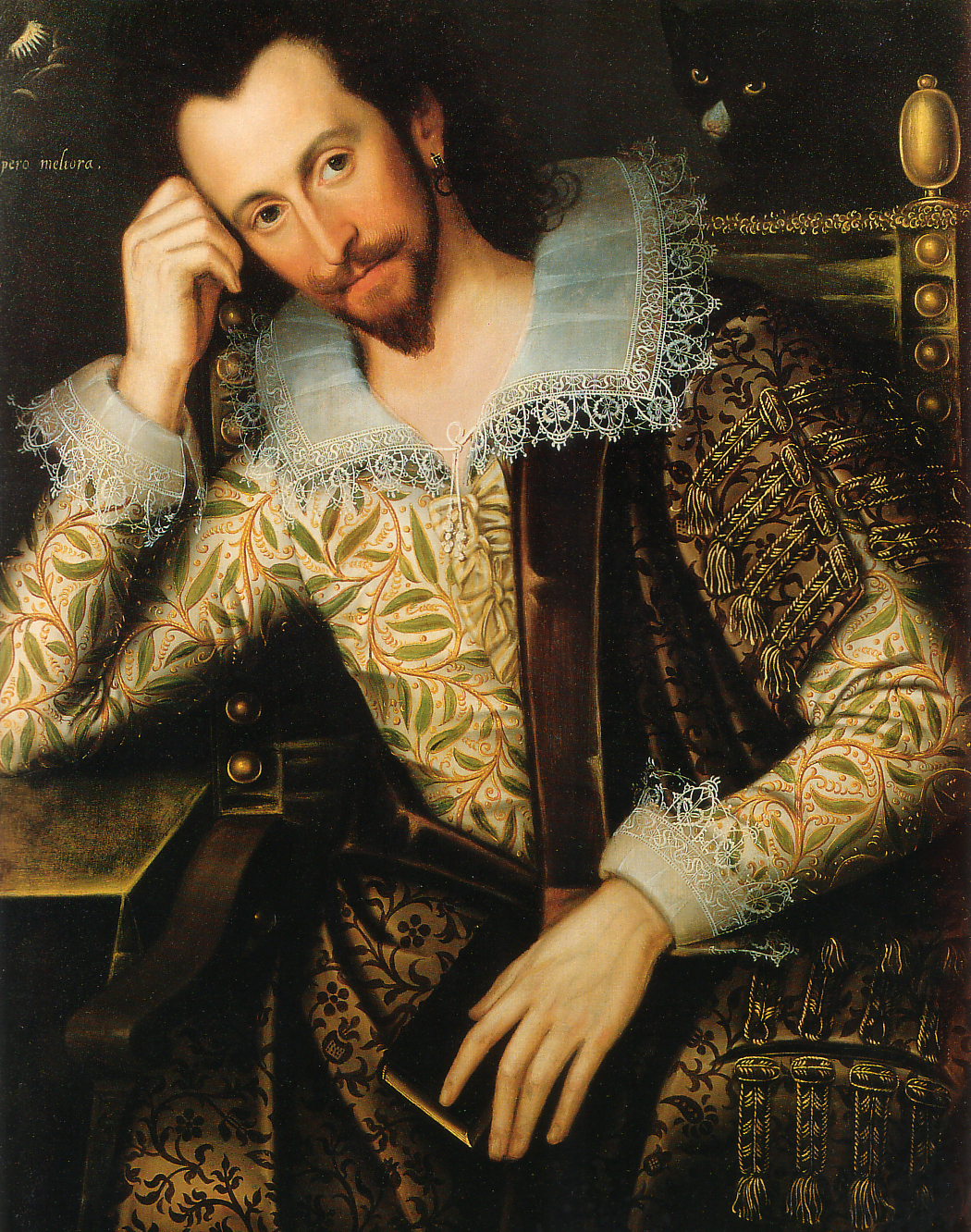
3 – c. 1610

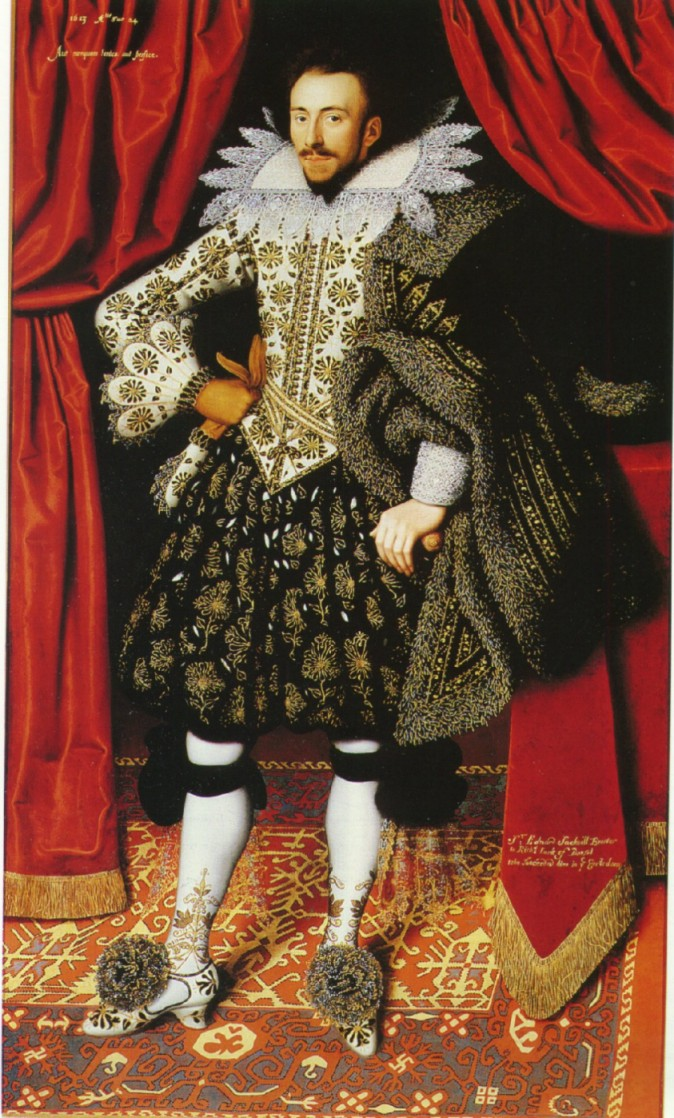
4 – 1613

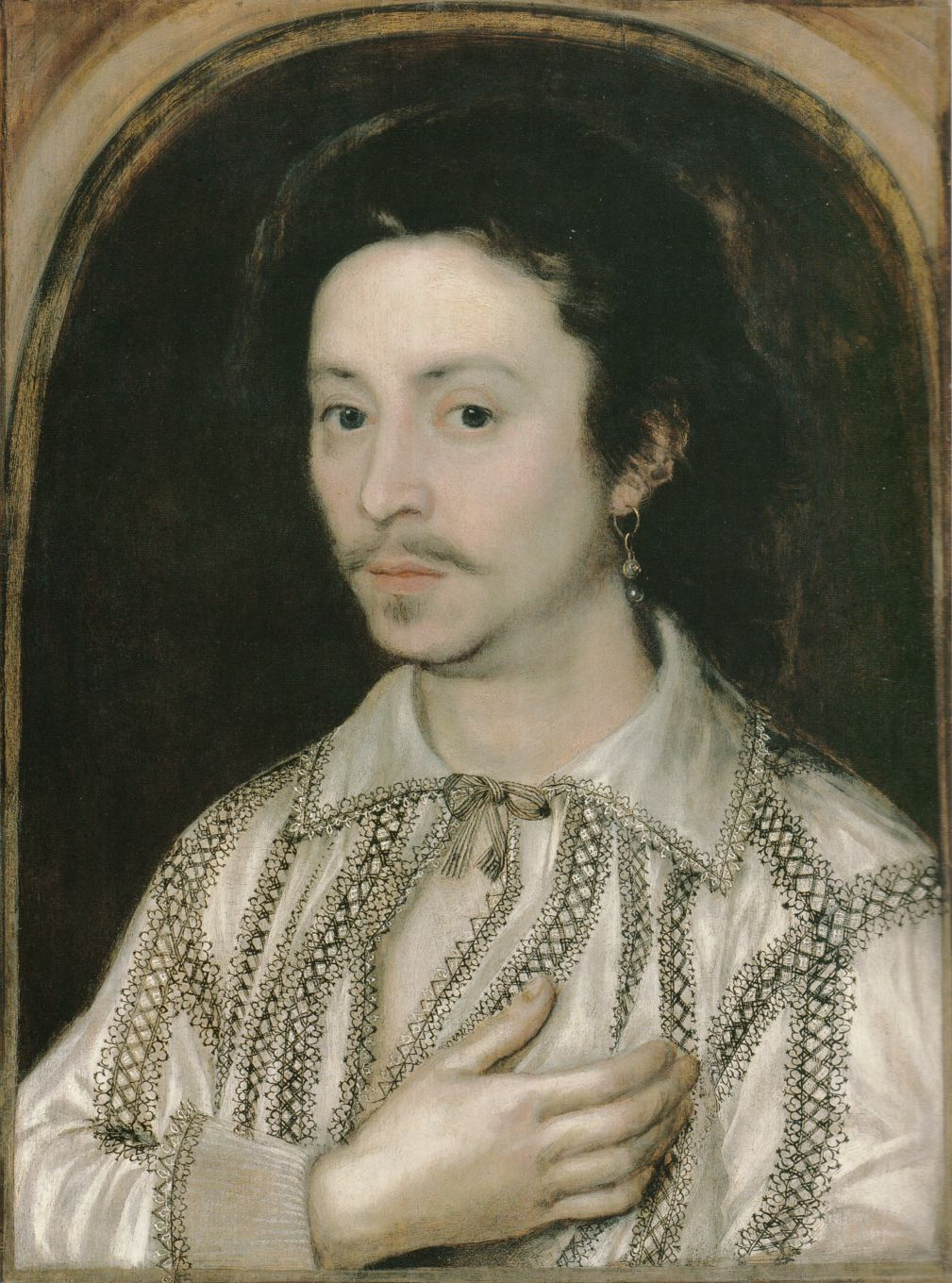
5 - 1615

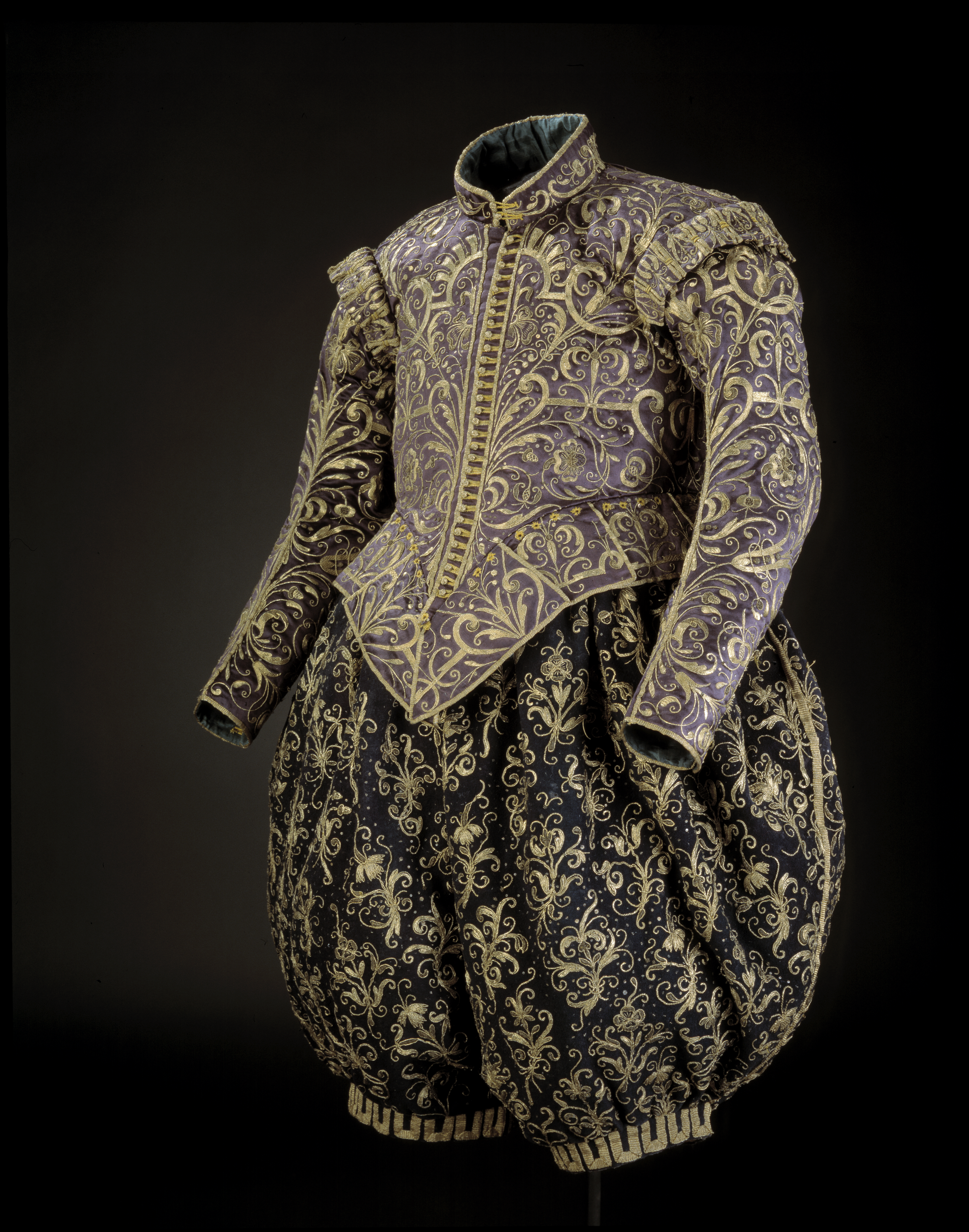
6 - 1620

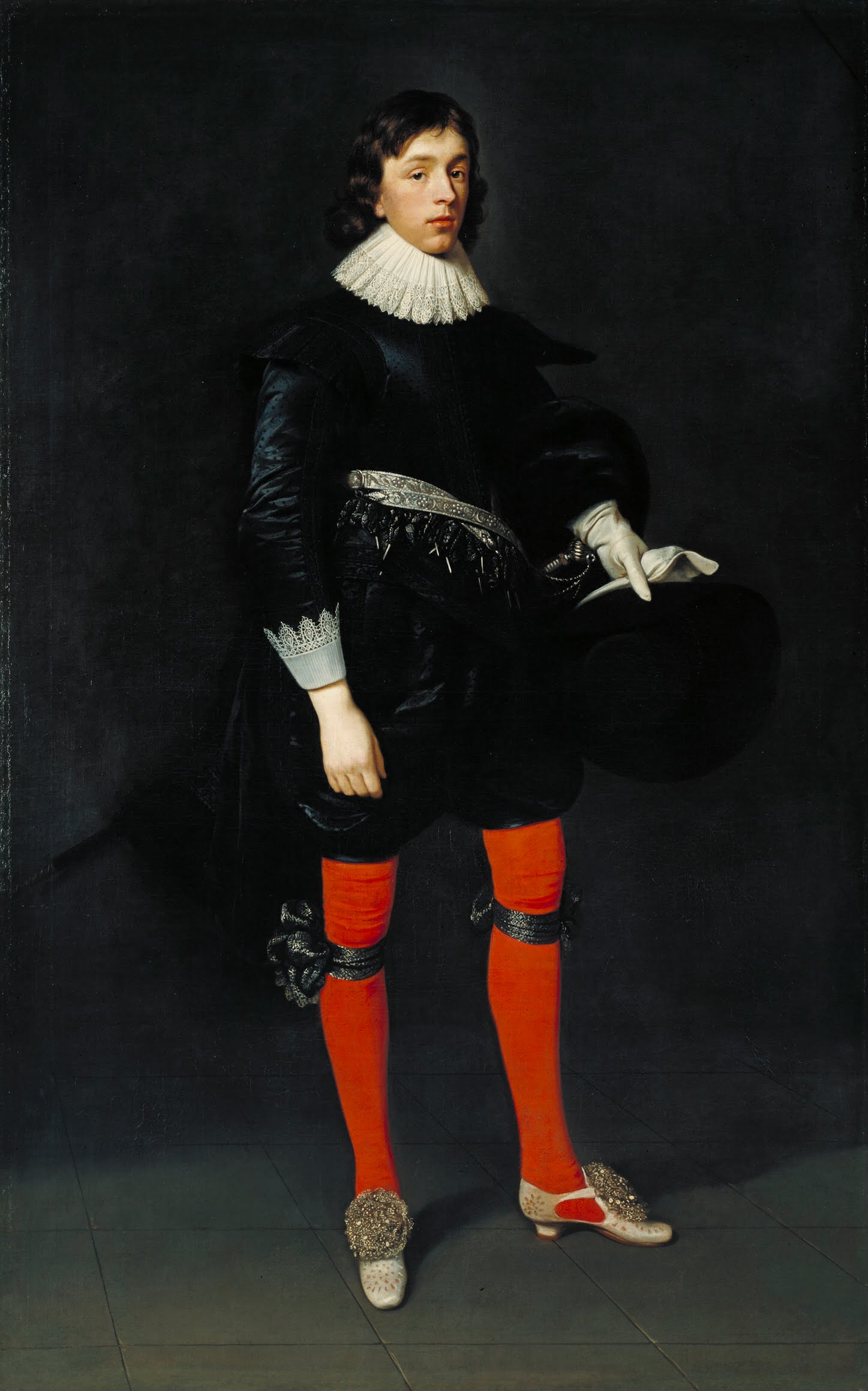
7 – 1623

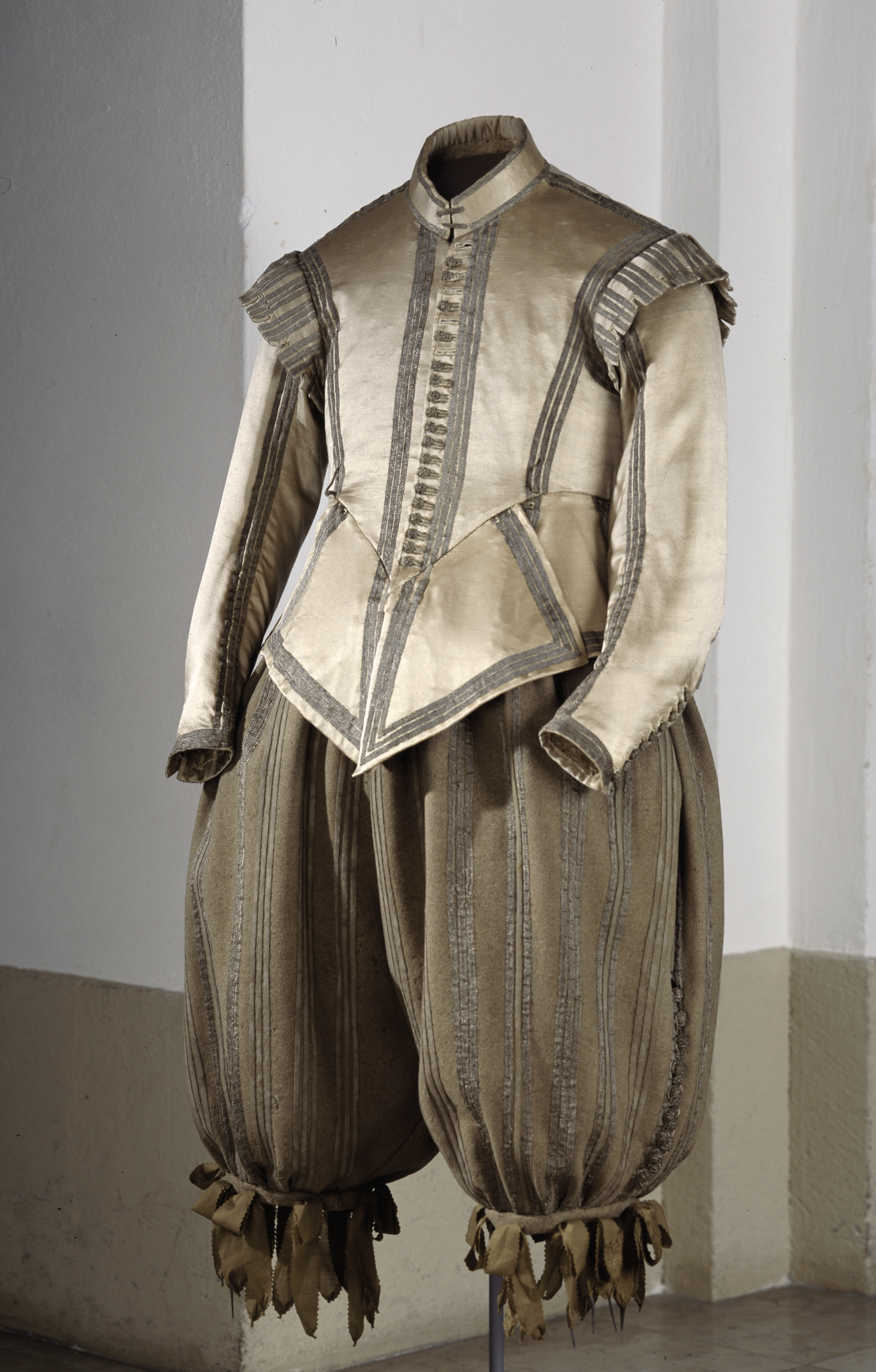
8 – 1627

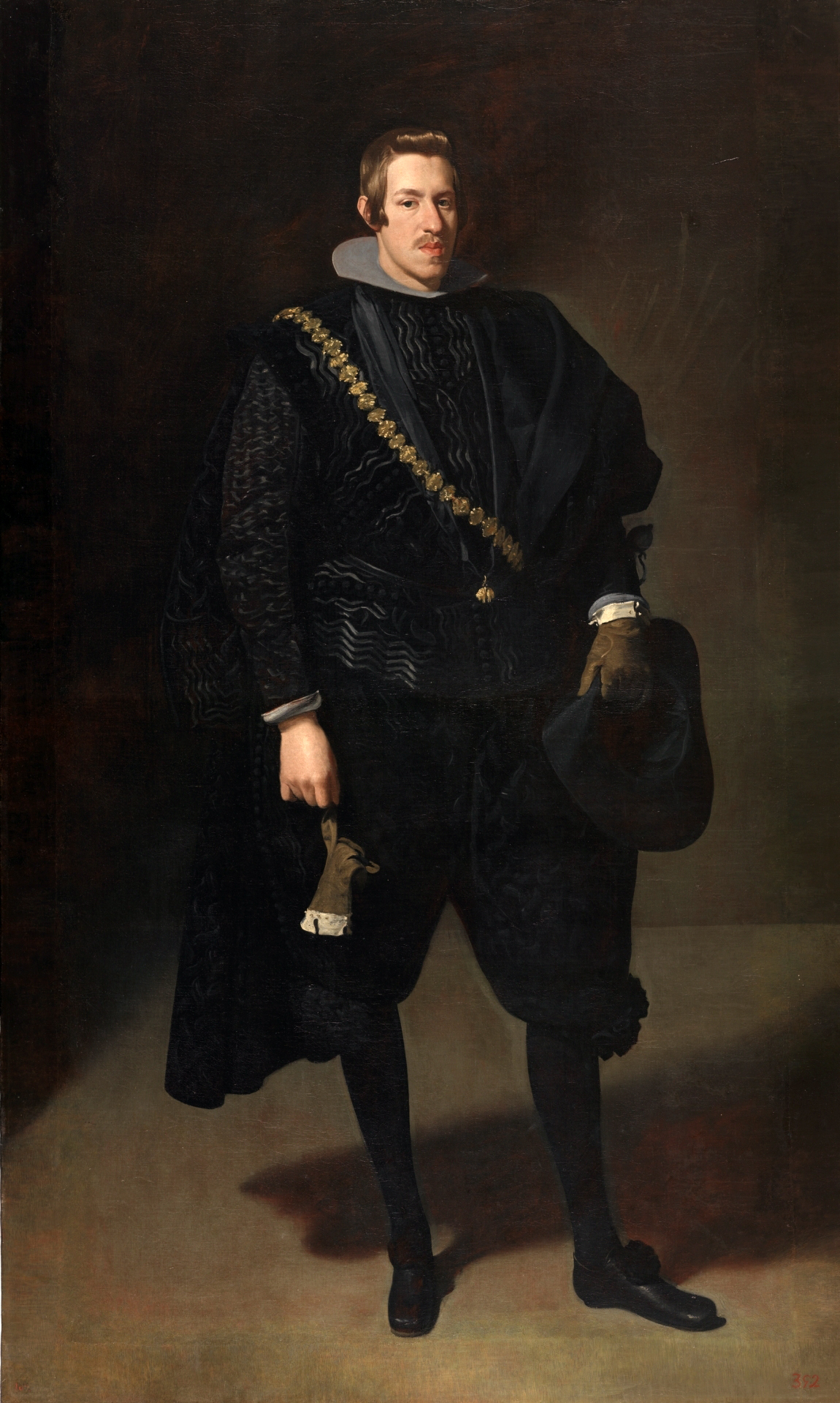
9 – 1628

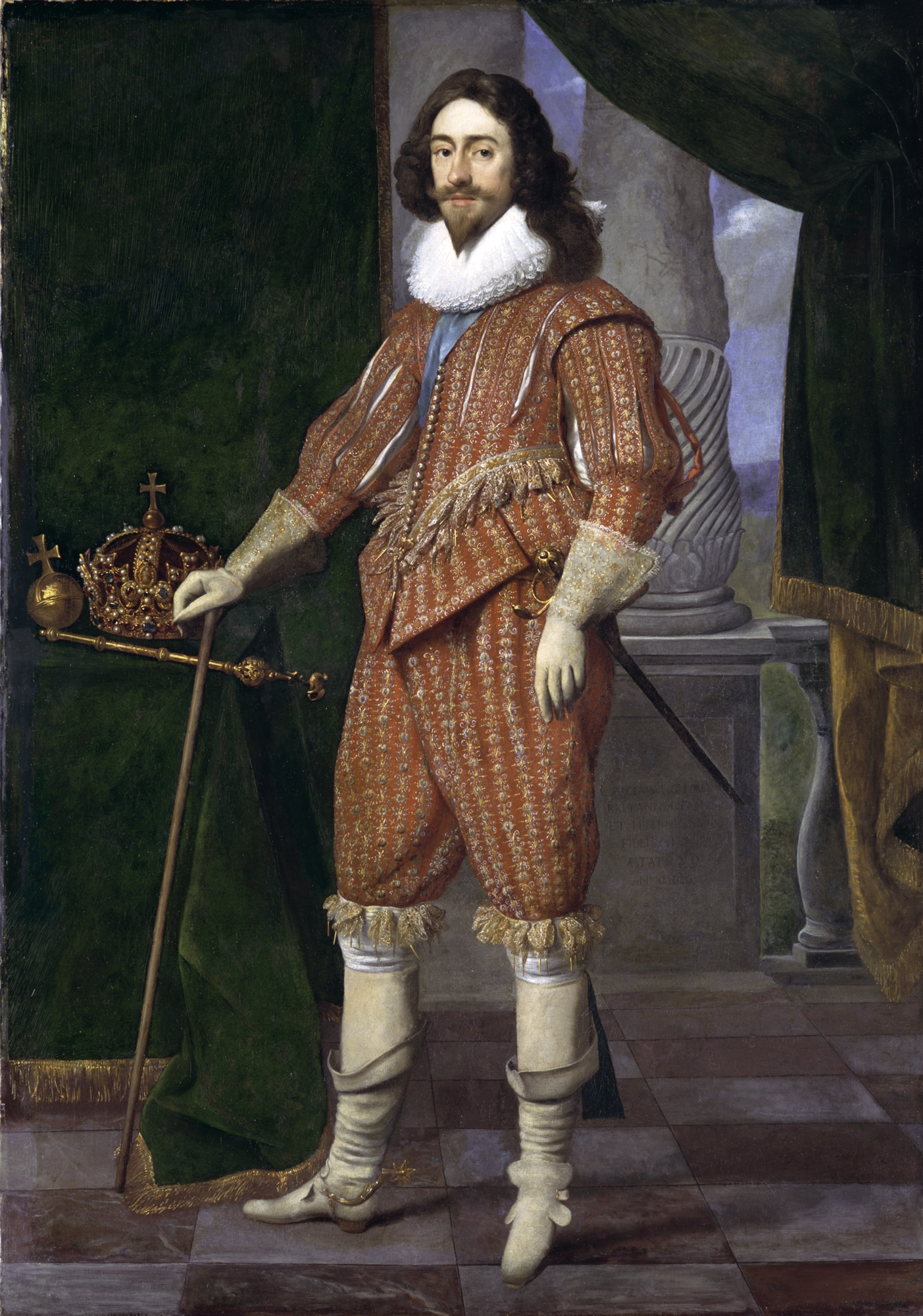
10 – 1629

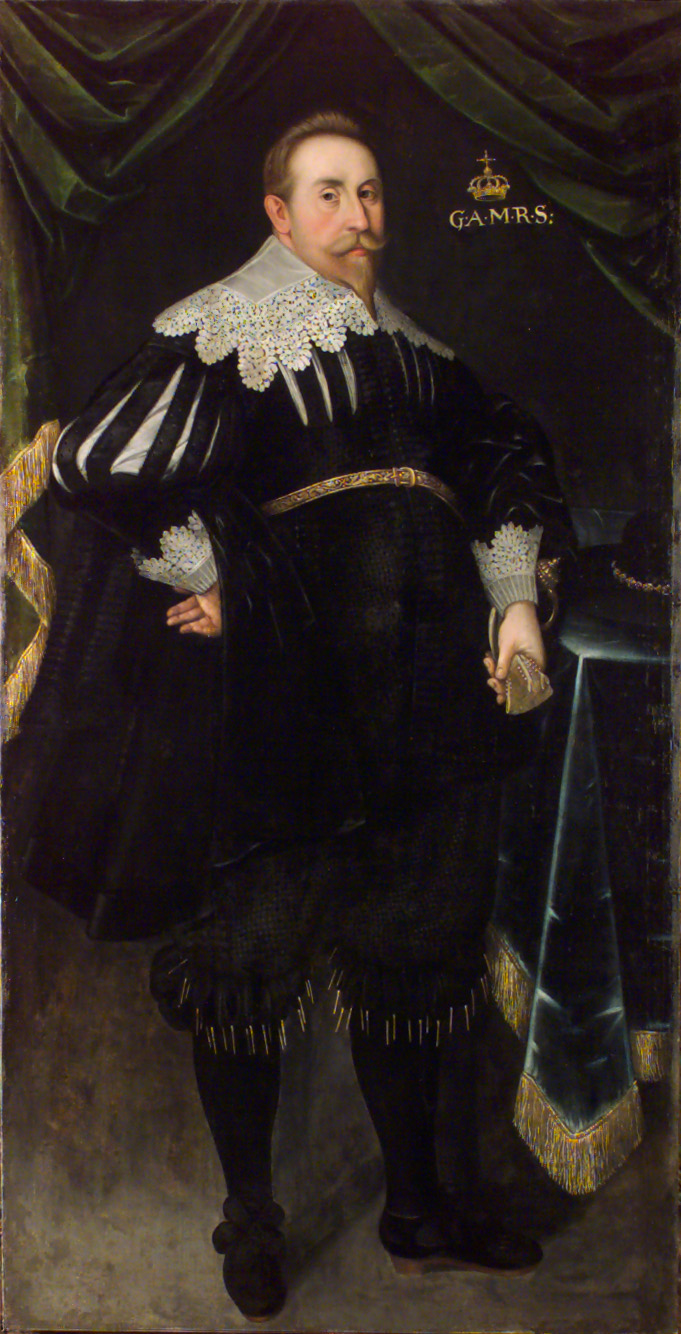
11 - 1630
1. James VI and I, 1603–1610, wears a satin doublet, wired whisk, short cape, and hose over cannions. Narrow points are tied in bows at his waist. He wears the garter and collar of the Order of the Garter.
2. The young Henry, Prince of Wales and his companion wear doublets with wide wings and tight sleeves, and matching full breeches with soft pleats at the waist. For hunting, they wear plain linen shirts with flat collars and short cuffs at the wrist. Their soft boots turn down into cuffs below the knee, and are worn with linen boot hose. The prince wears a felt hat with a feather, 1606–09.
3. Peter Saltonstall, in a fashionably melancholic pose c. 1610, wears an embroidered linen jacket under a brown robe with split sleeves. The robe sleeves have buttons and parallel rows of fringed braid that make button loops. The flat pleats or darts that shape his sheer collar and cuffs are visible. He wears an earring hung by a black cord.
4. Richard Sackville, 3rd Earl of Dorset wears elaborate clothing, probably for the wedding of the King's daughter Elizabeth in 1613 (see notes on image page). His doublet, shoes, and the cuffs of his gloves are embroidered to match, and he wears a sleeved cloak on one arm and very full hose.
5. Actor Nathan Field in a shirt decorated with blackwork embroidery, 1615.
6. Gustav II Adolf, Wedding attire from the wedding of Gustav II Adolf and Maria Eleonora 1620.
7. James Hamilton wears the unstarched ruff that became popular in England in the 1620s. His hose reach to the lower thigh and are worn with scarlet stockings and heeled shoes, 1623.
8. Silk doublet and wadmal breeches worn by Gustav II Adolf, 1627.
9. Don Carlos of Spain wears a black patterned doublet with full black breeches, black stockings, and flat black shoes with roses. He carried a wide-brimmed black hat, 1628.
10. Charles I. By the 1620s, doublets were still pointed but the waistline was rising above long tabs or skirts. Sleeves are slashed to the elbow and tight below. Points are more elaborate bows, and hose have completed the transition to breeches.
11. Gustav II Adolf, King of Sweden (1611–1632) wears the Swedish Protestant fashions of the 17th century. Boots adorned with flowers, doublet, cuffs and sheer collar.

=== Style gallery 1630s–1640s ===
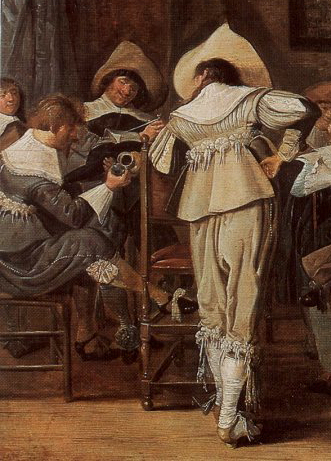
1 – 1630s

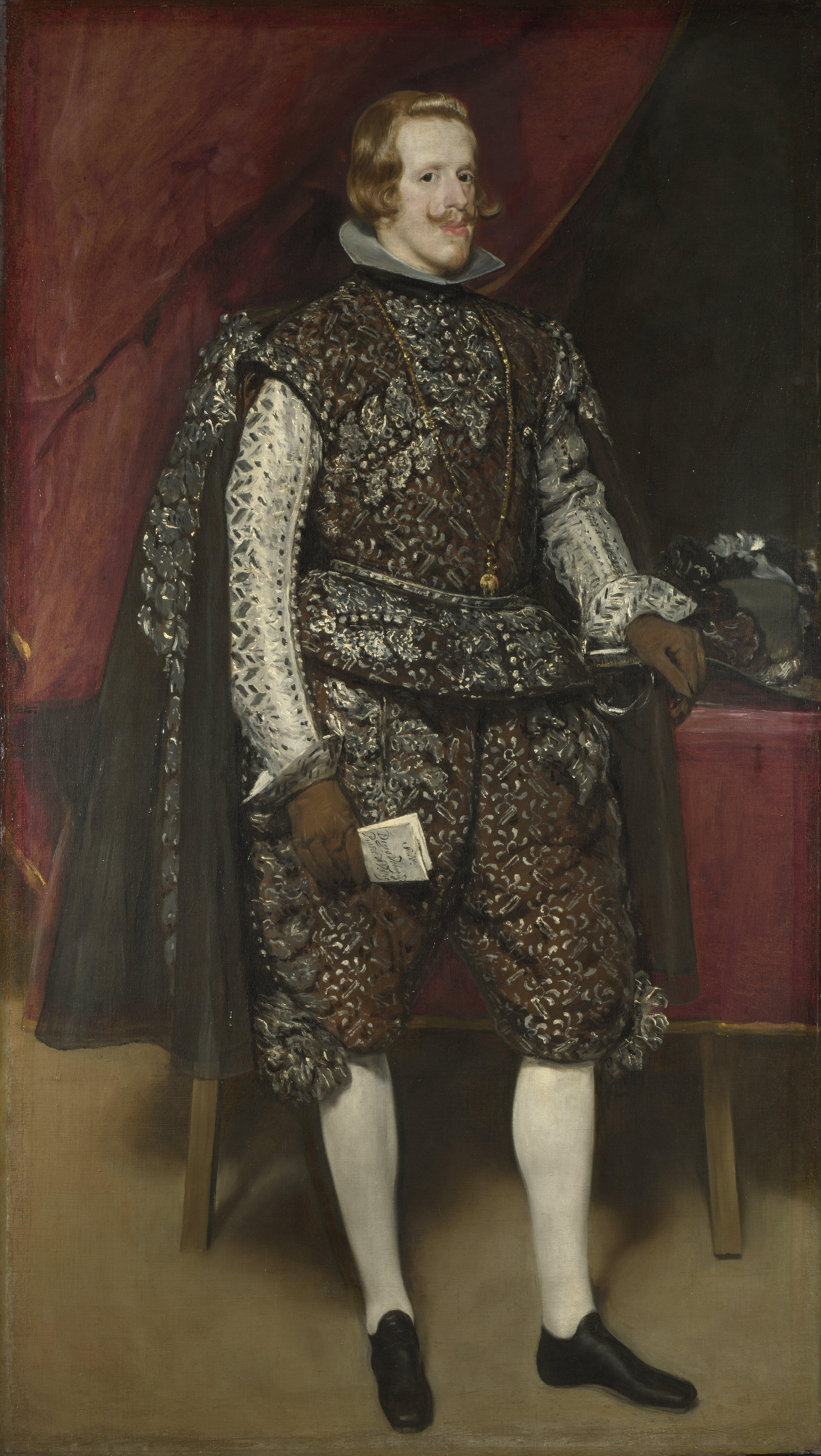
2 – 1631–32

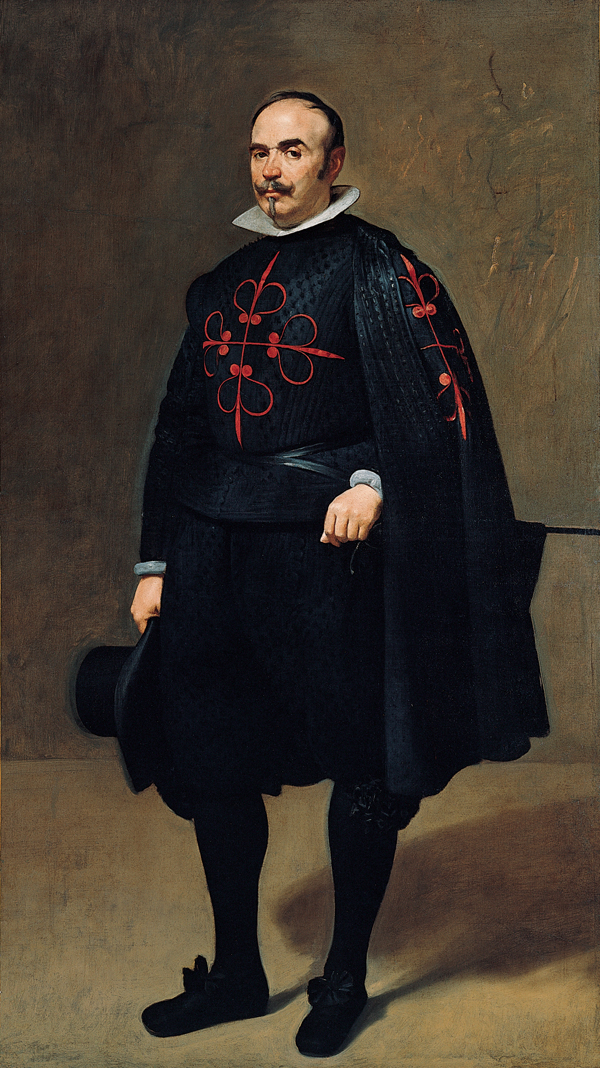
3 – 1632

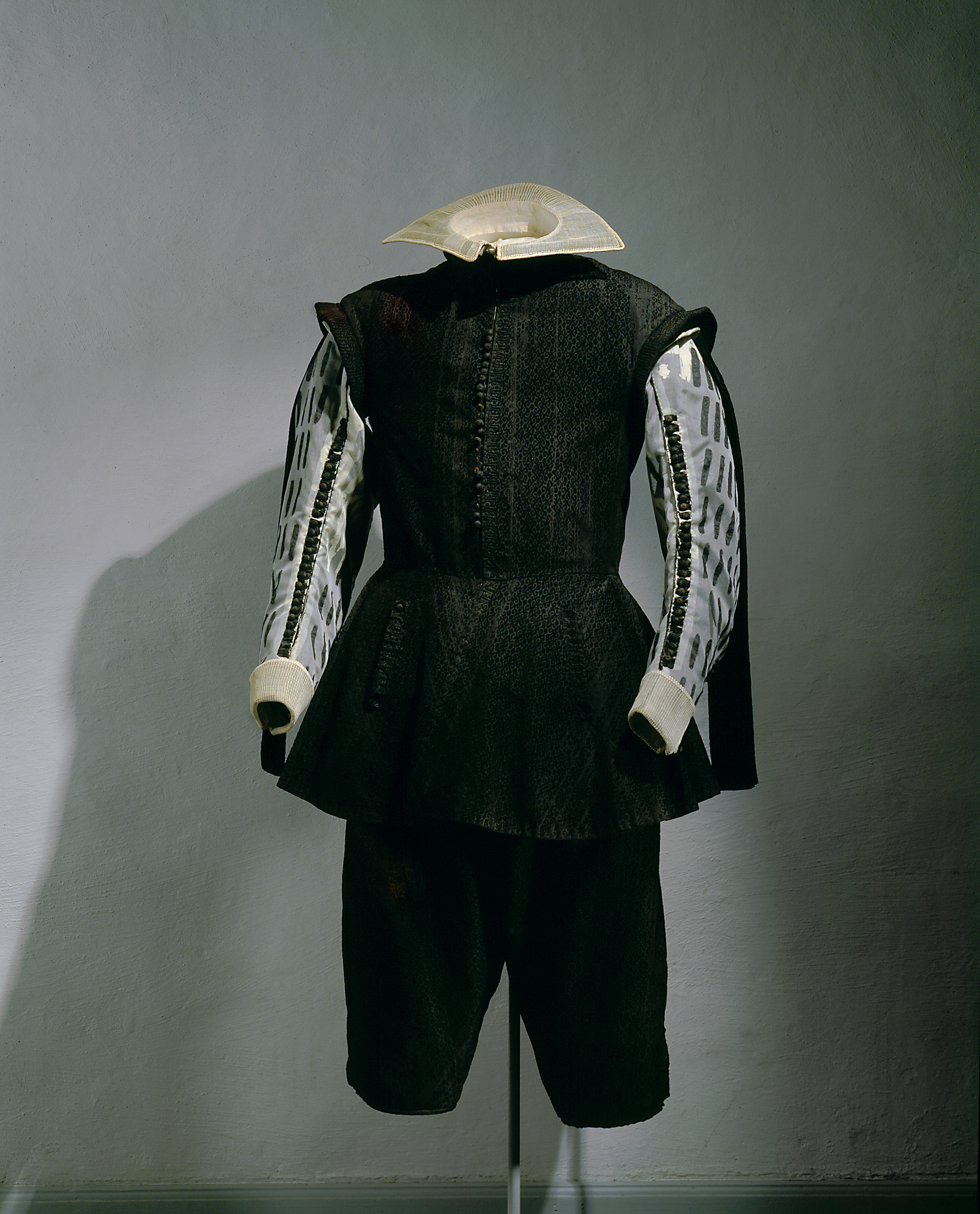
4 – 1630s or 1640s

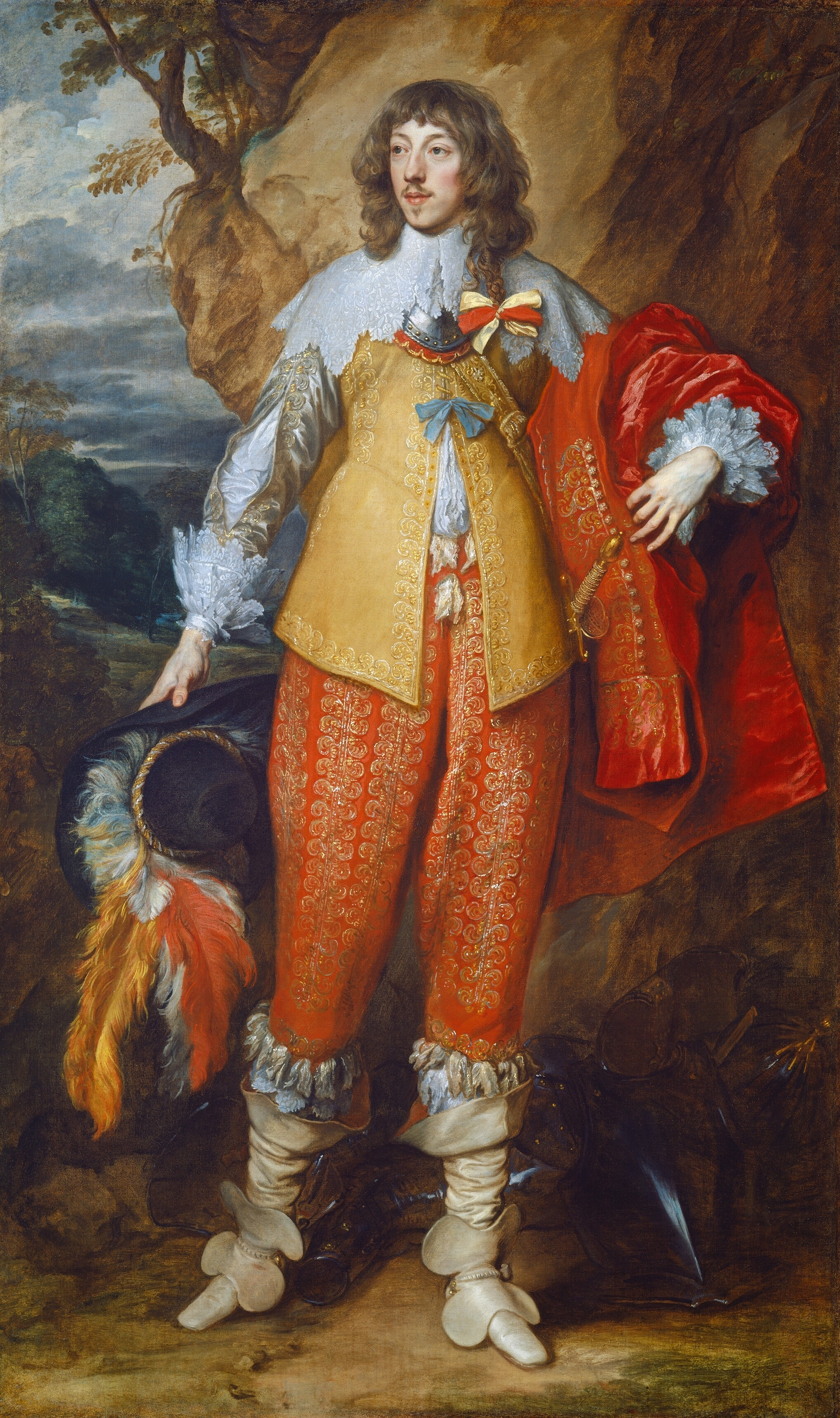
5 – 1634

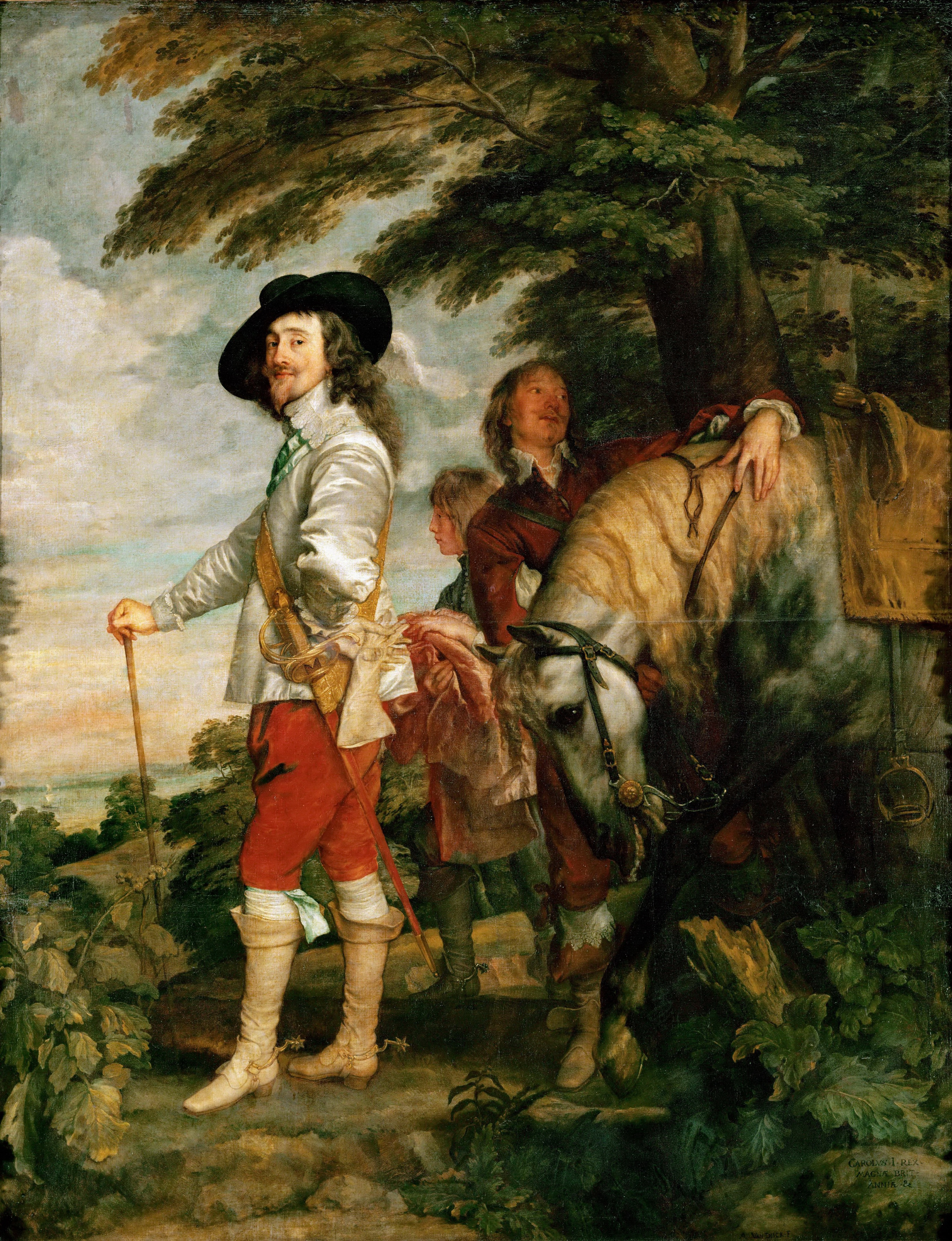
6 – 1635

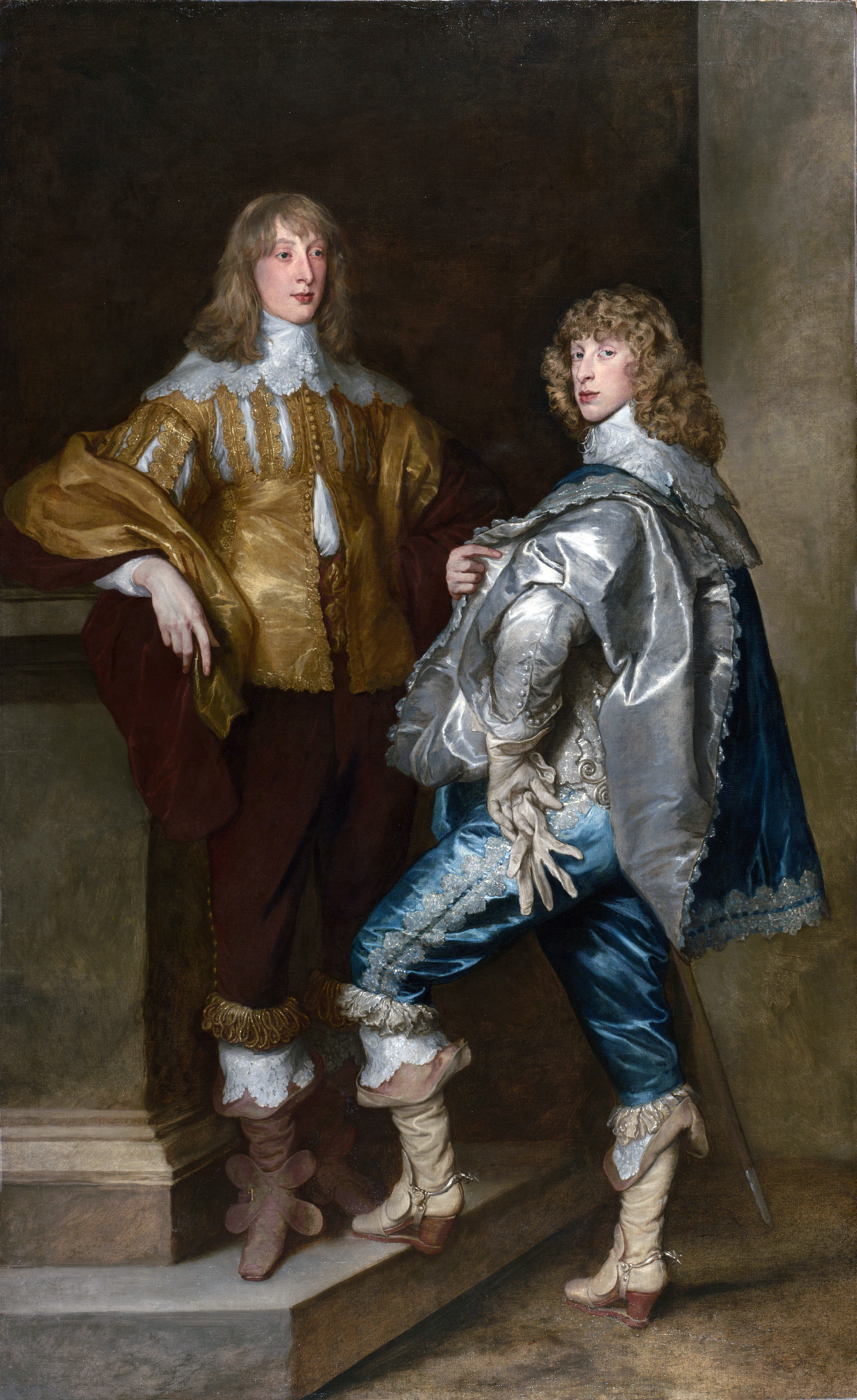
7 – c. 1638

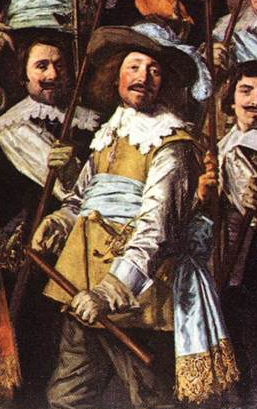
8 – 1639

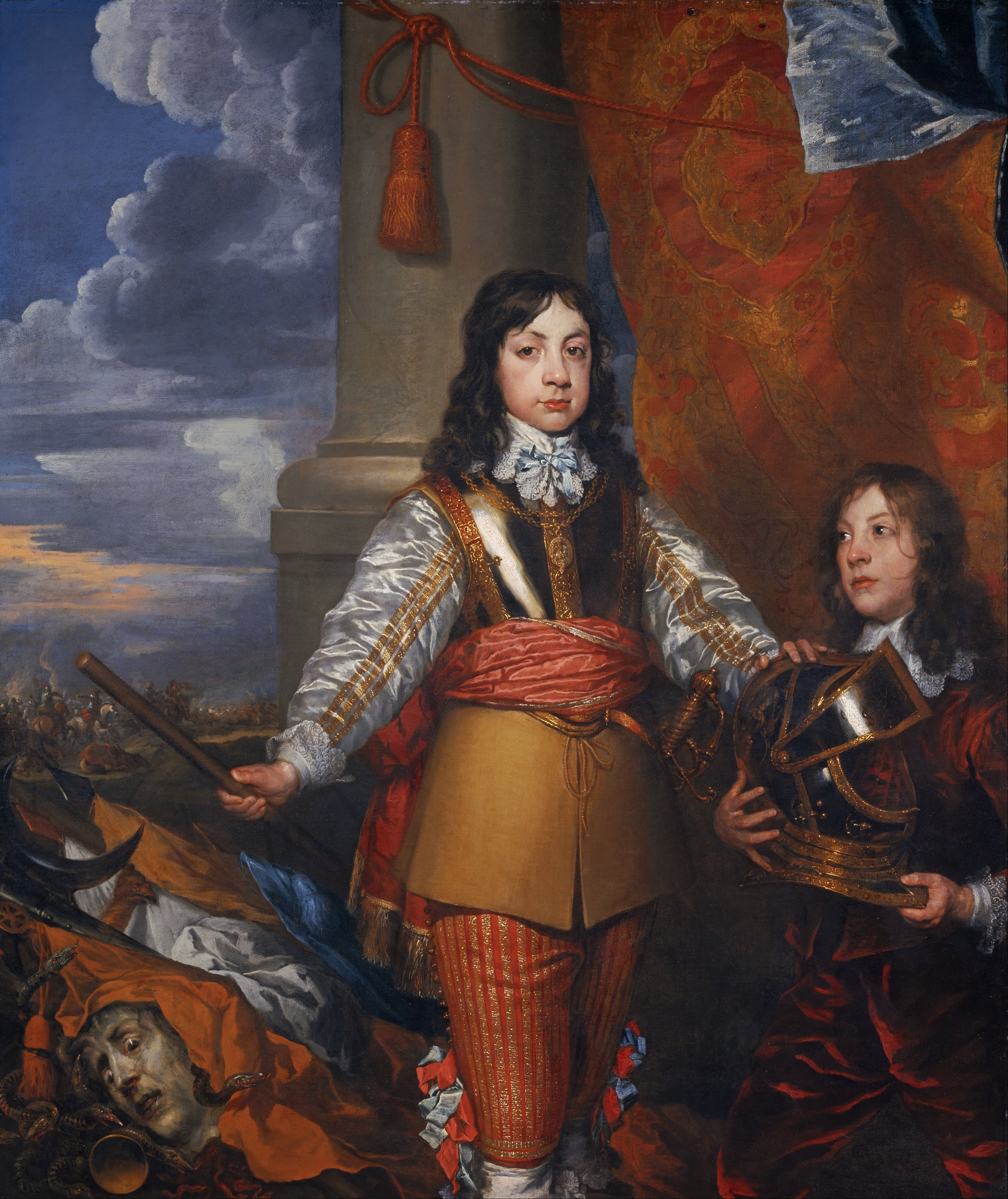
9 – 1642

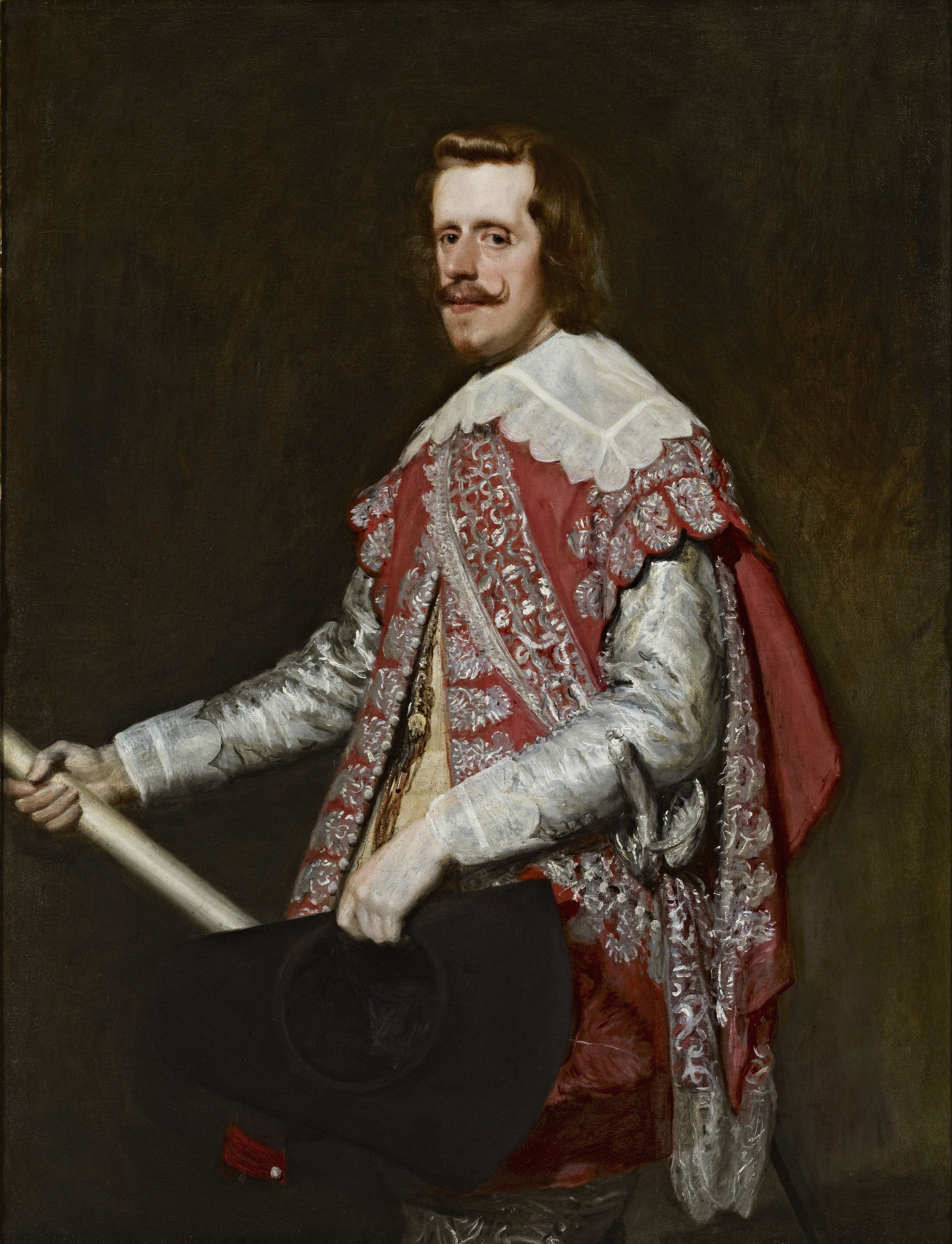
10 – 1644
1. Dutch fashion. The short-waisted doublet is slashed across the back. Points have elaborate ribbon rosettes (note matching points at hem of breeches).
2. Philip IV of Spain wears breeches and doublet of brown and silver and a dark cloak all trimmed with silver lace. His sleeves are white and he wears white stockings, plain black shoes, and brown leather gloves, 1631–32.
3. Don Pedro de Barberana y Aparregui wears conservative Spanish fashion 1632.
4. Spanish custume worn by Nils Brahe, from 1630s or 1640s including a golilla, a stiff linen collar projecting at right angles from the neck.
5. Henri II of Lorraine, Duke de Guise, in the buff leather jerkin and gorget (neck armor) of a soldier. His jerkin is open from the mid-chest, and his breeches match his cape, 1634.
6. Charles I's doublet of 1635 is shorter waisted, and points have disappeared. He wears a broad-brimmed hat and boots.
7. Royalist style: Brothers Lord John Stuart and Lord Bernard Stuart wear contrasting satin doublets and breeches, satin-lined short cloaks, and high collars with lavish lace scallops. Their high-heeled boots have deep cuffs and are worn over boot hose with lace tops, c. 1638.
8. A Dutch civic guardsman wears a short-waisted leather buff jerkin and a broad sash, both fashionable among soldiers. 1639.
9. The young Charles, Prince of Wales, (later Charles II) wears a soldier's buff jerkin, sash, and half armor over a fashionable doublet and breeches trimmed with ribbon bows.
10. Philip IV of Spain in military dress, 1644, wears a broad linen collar and matching cuffs. His sleeved short gown or cassock of red with metallic embroidery is worn over a buff jerkin and silver-gray sleeves. He carries a broad-brimmed black hat cocked on one side.

== Footwear ==
Heeled shoes with shoe roses

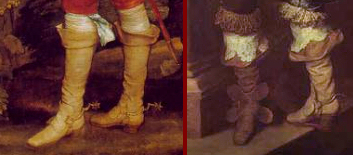
Boots with boothose, early (left) and late (right) 1630s

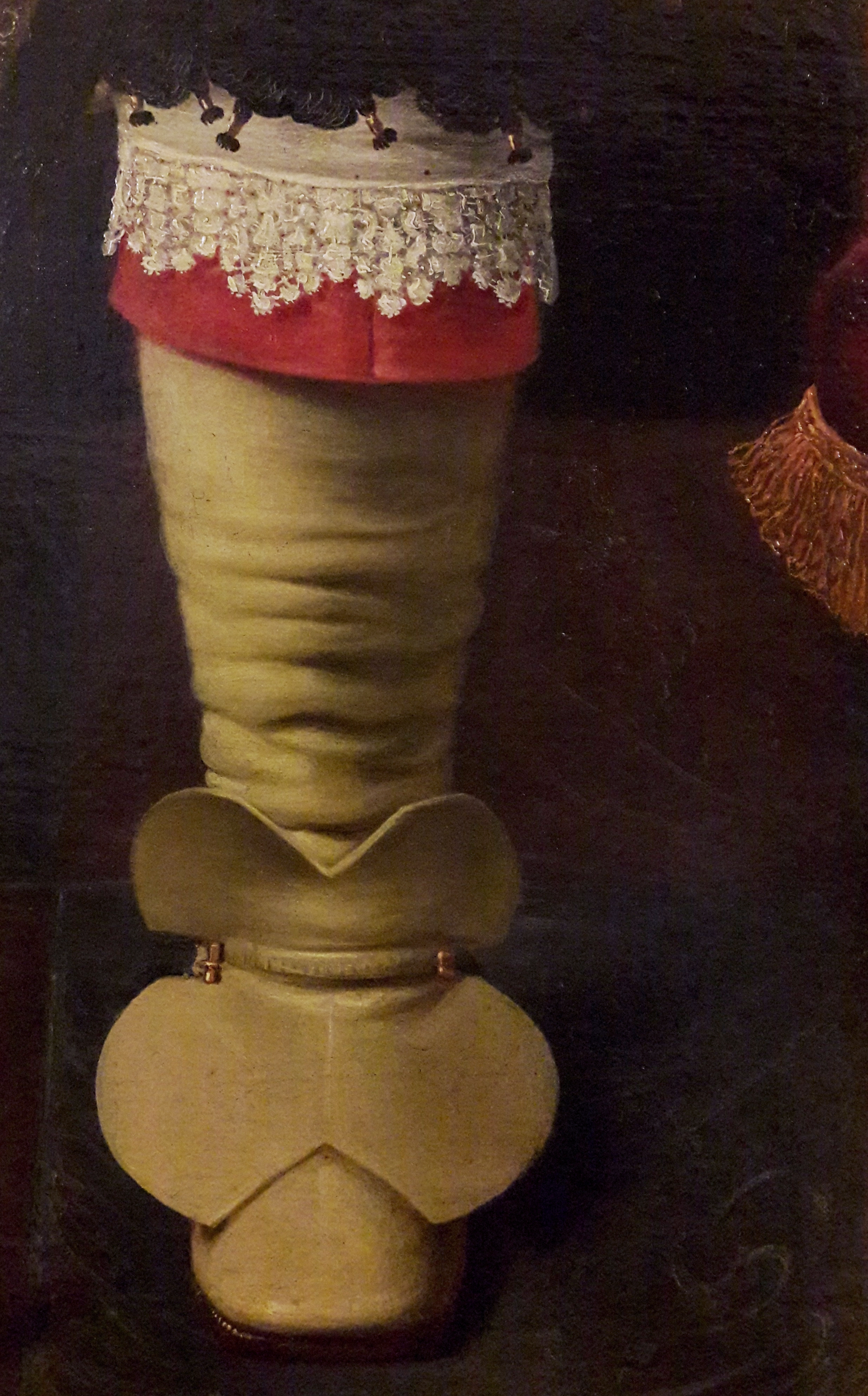
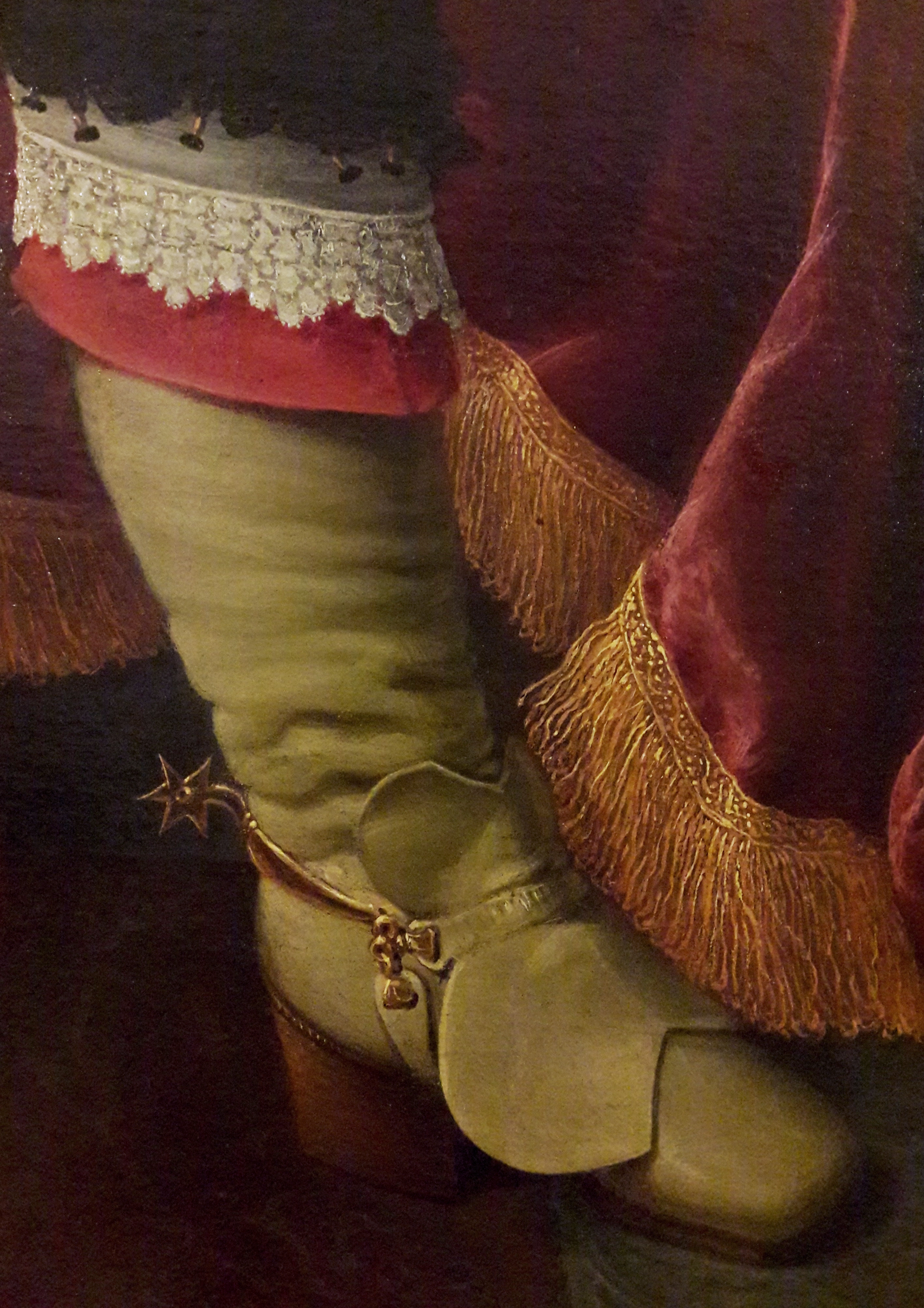
Bucket heeled boots with butterflies and spurs of King Ladislaus IV of Poland, c. 1640; butterflies were meant to reduce chafing from the spur straps

Flat shoes were worn to around 1610, when a low heel became popular. The ribbon tie over the instep that had appeared on late sixteenth century shoes grew into elaborate lace or ribbon rosettes called shoe roses that were worn by the most fashionable men and women.

Backless slippers called pantofles were worn indoors.

By the 1620s, heeled boots became popular for indoor as well as outdoor wear. The boots themselves were usually turned down below the knee; boot tops became wider until the "bucket-top" boot associated with The Three Musketeers appeared in the 1630s. Spurs straps featured decorative butterfly-shaped spur leathers over the instep.

Wooden clogs or pattens were worn outdoors over shoes and boots to keep the high heels from sinking into soft dirt.

Stockings had elaborate clocks or embroidery at the ankles early in the period. Boothose of stout linen were worn under boots to protect fine knitted stockings; these could be trimmed with lace.

== Children's fashion ==
Toddler boys wore gowns or skirts and doublets until they were breeched.

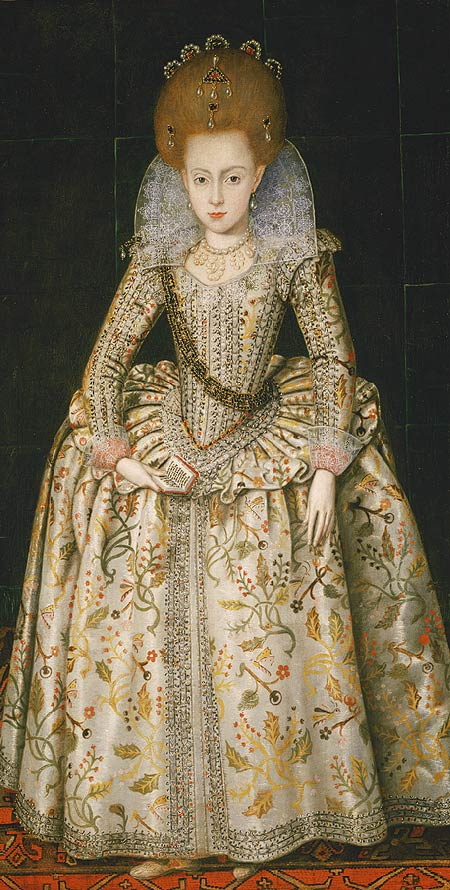
1 – English, 1606

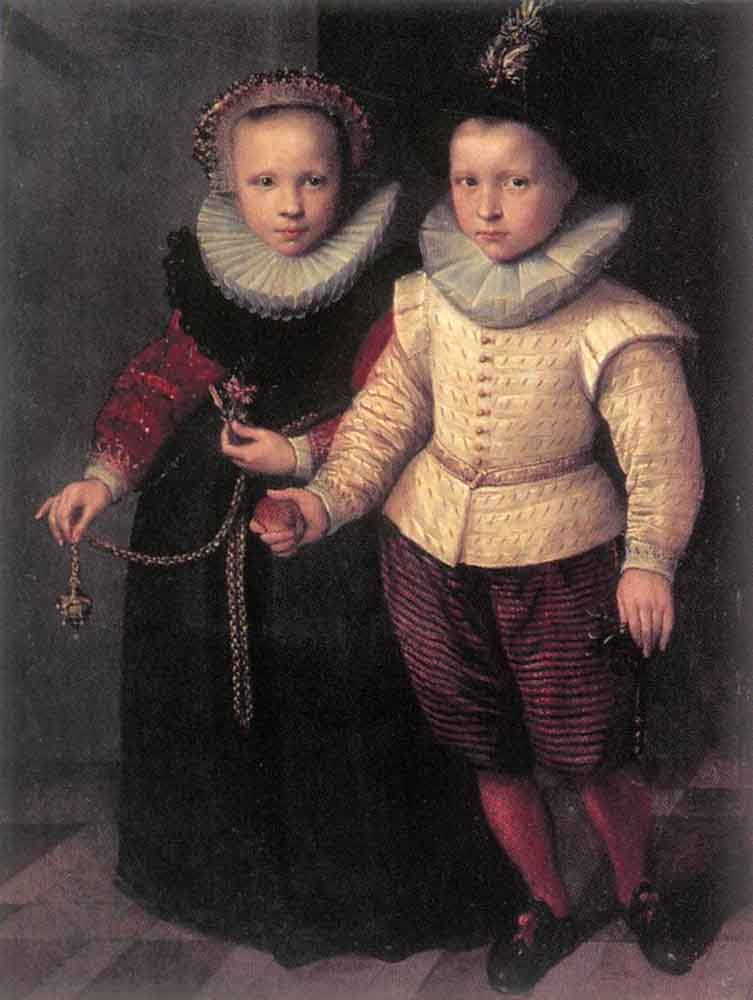
2 – Dutch, 1st Qtr 17th century

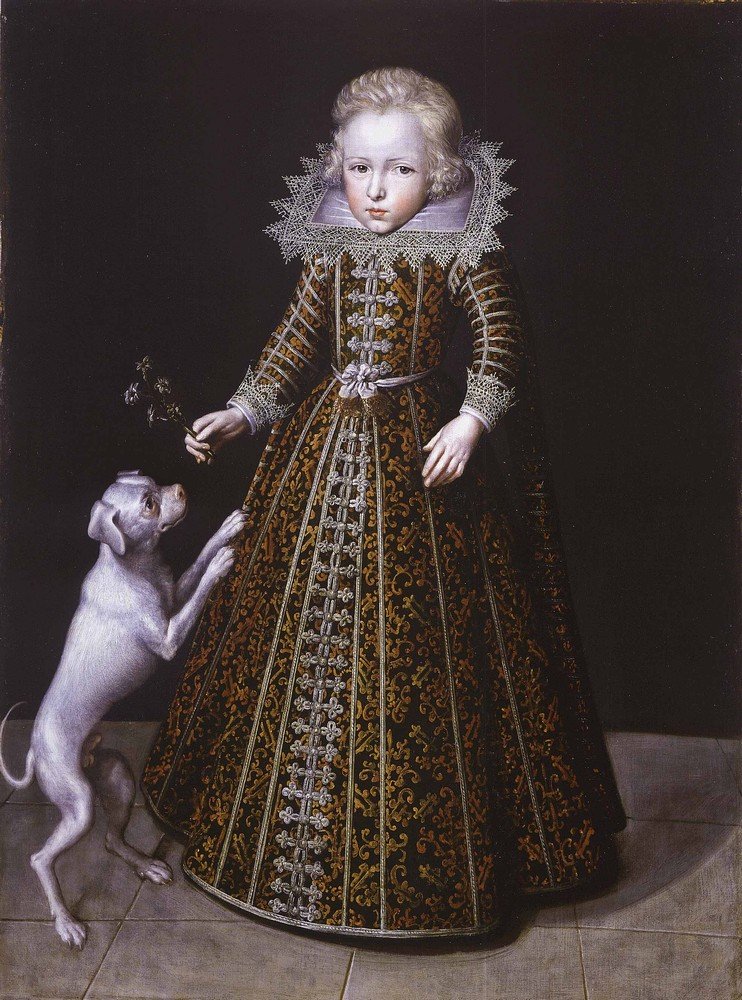
3 – Prince Ulrik of Denmark, c. 1615

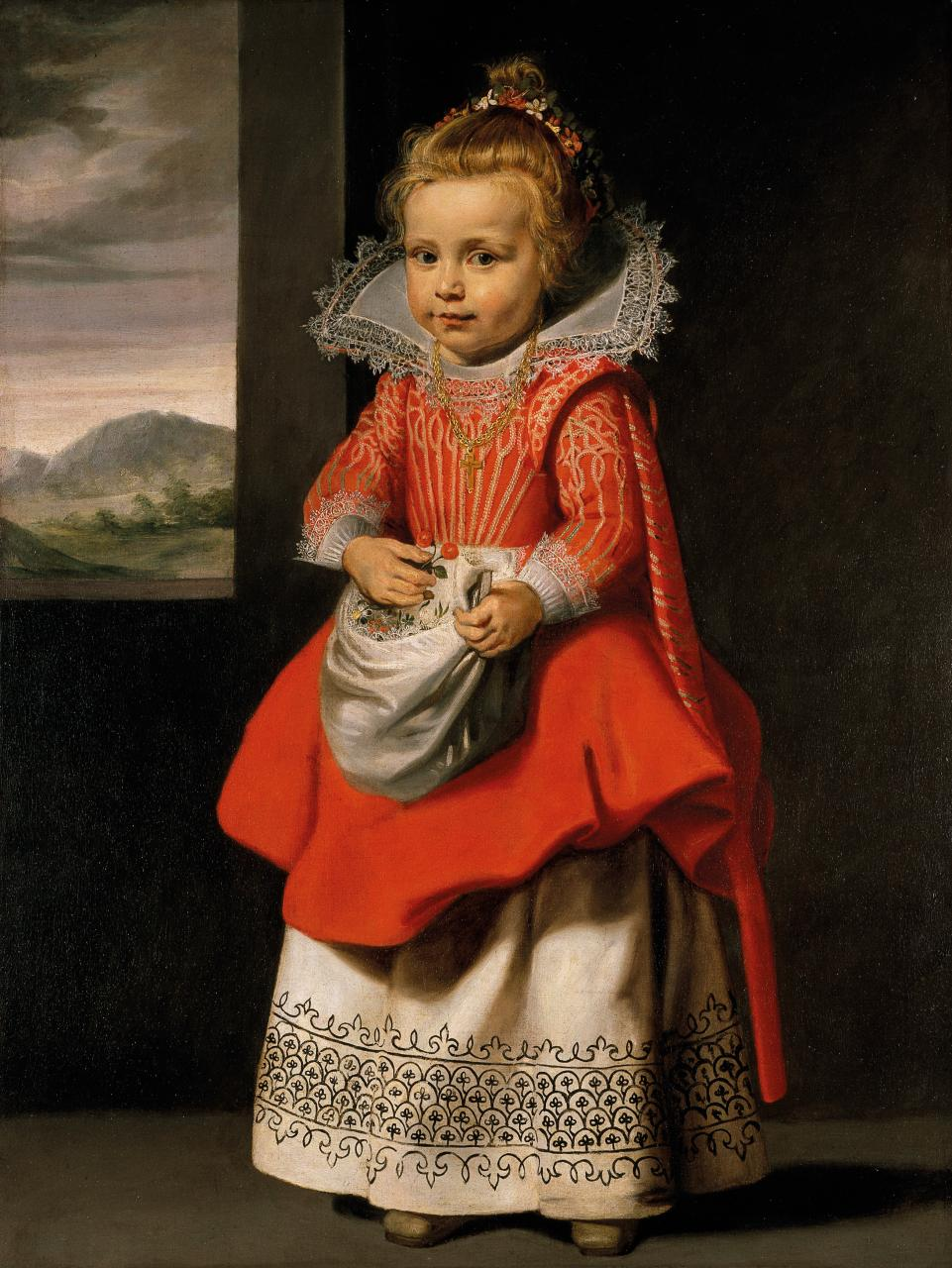
4 – Dutch, c. 1623

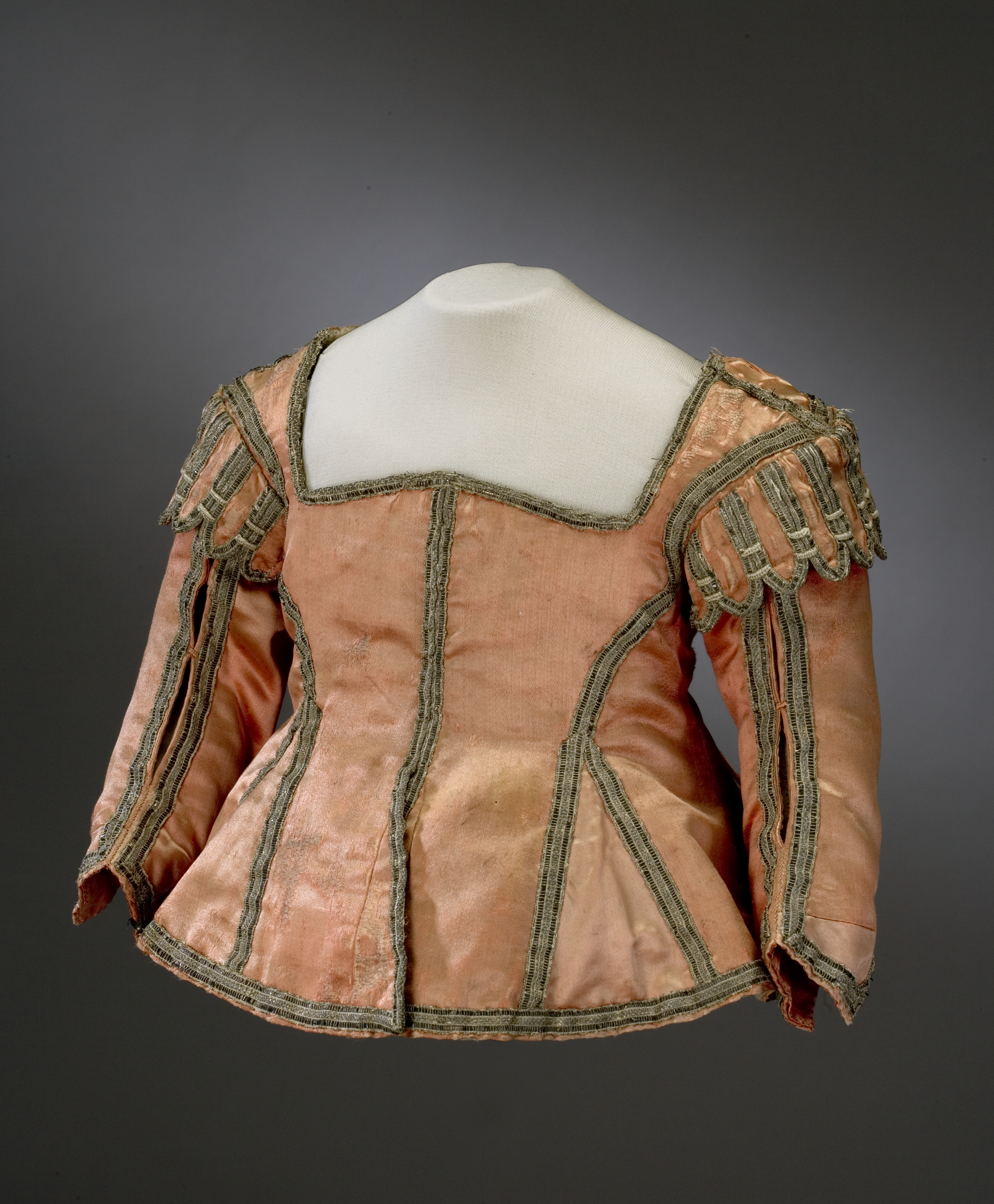
5 – Dress jacket worn by Christina of Sweden at the age of two, c. 1629

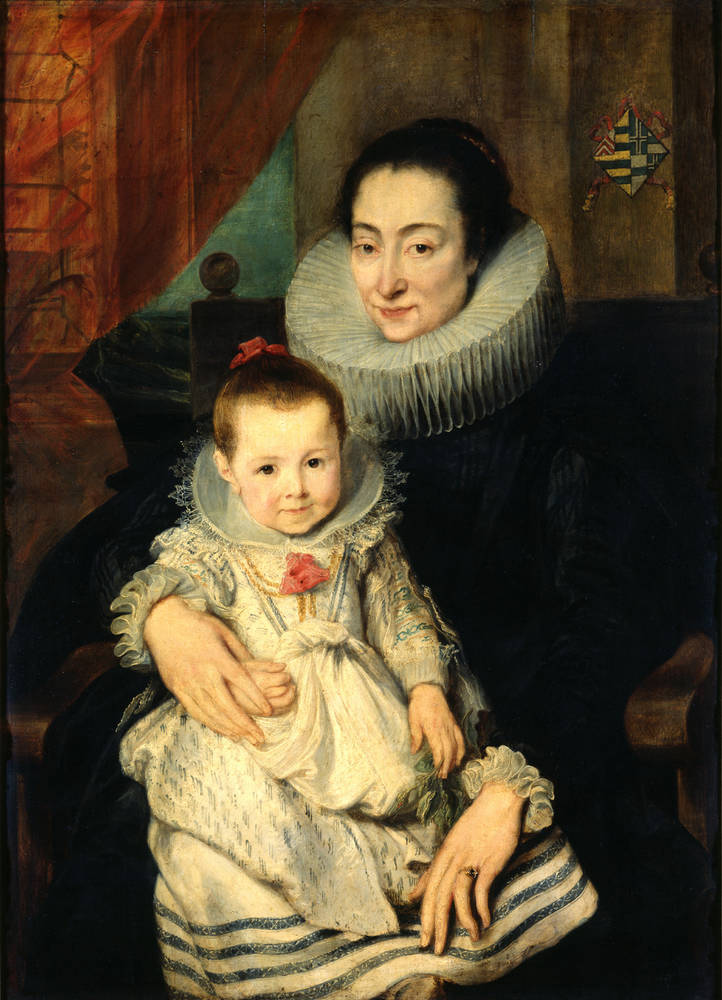
6 – Dutch, 1st 3rd 17th century

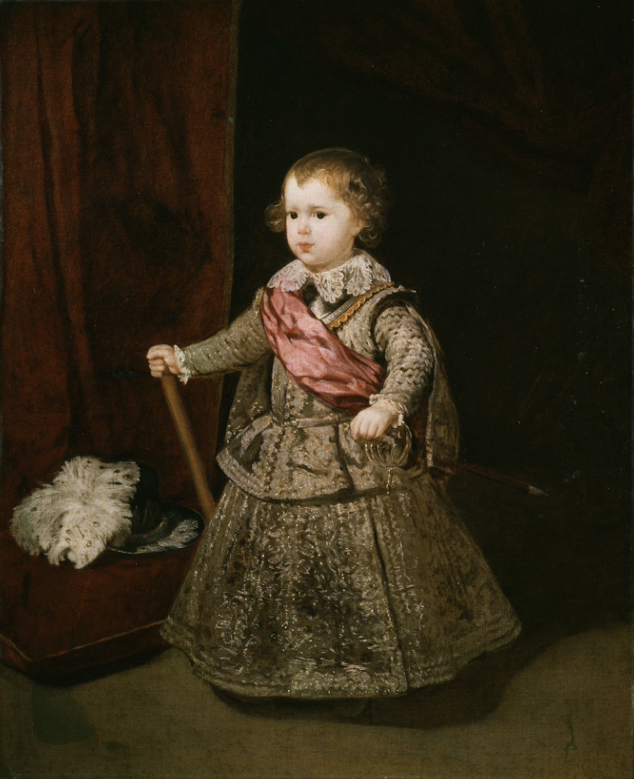
7 – Spanish, 1630–33

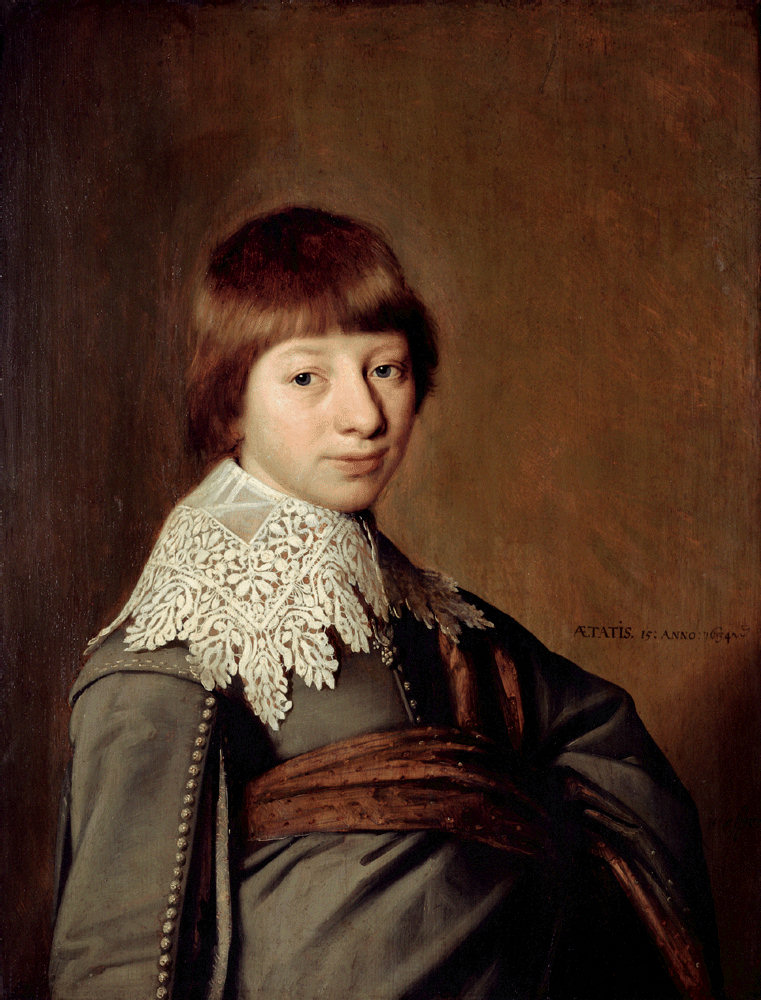
8 – Dutch, 1634

9 – Dutch, 1636

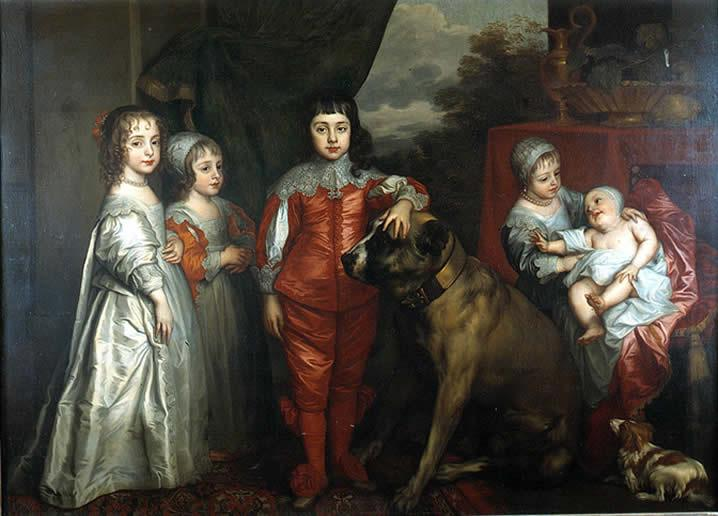
10 – English, The children of King Charles I of England, 1637

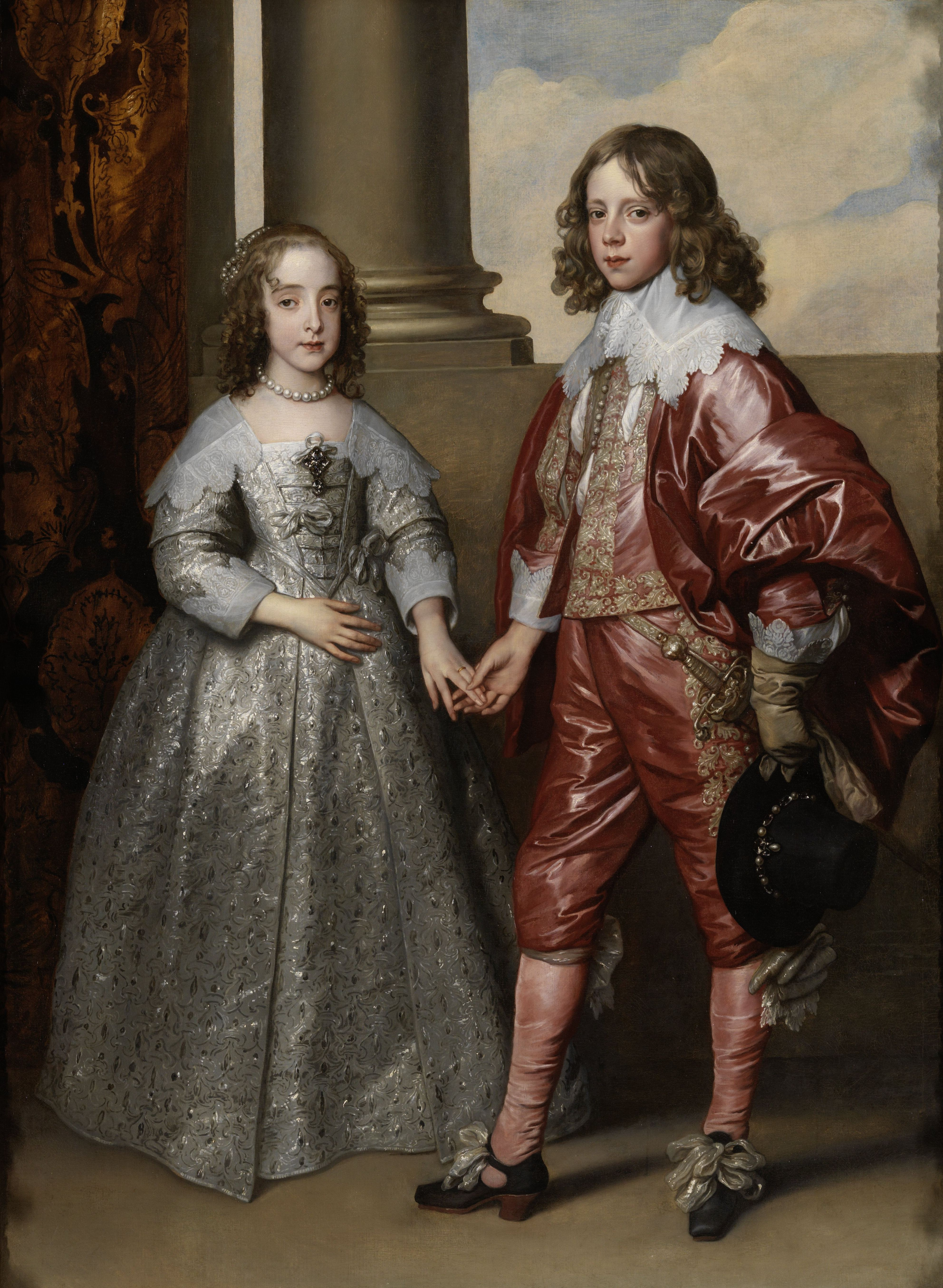
11 – Dutch, 15-year-old William II, Prince of Orange with his bride, 1641

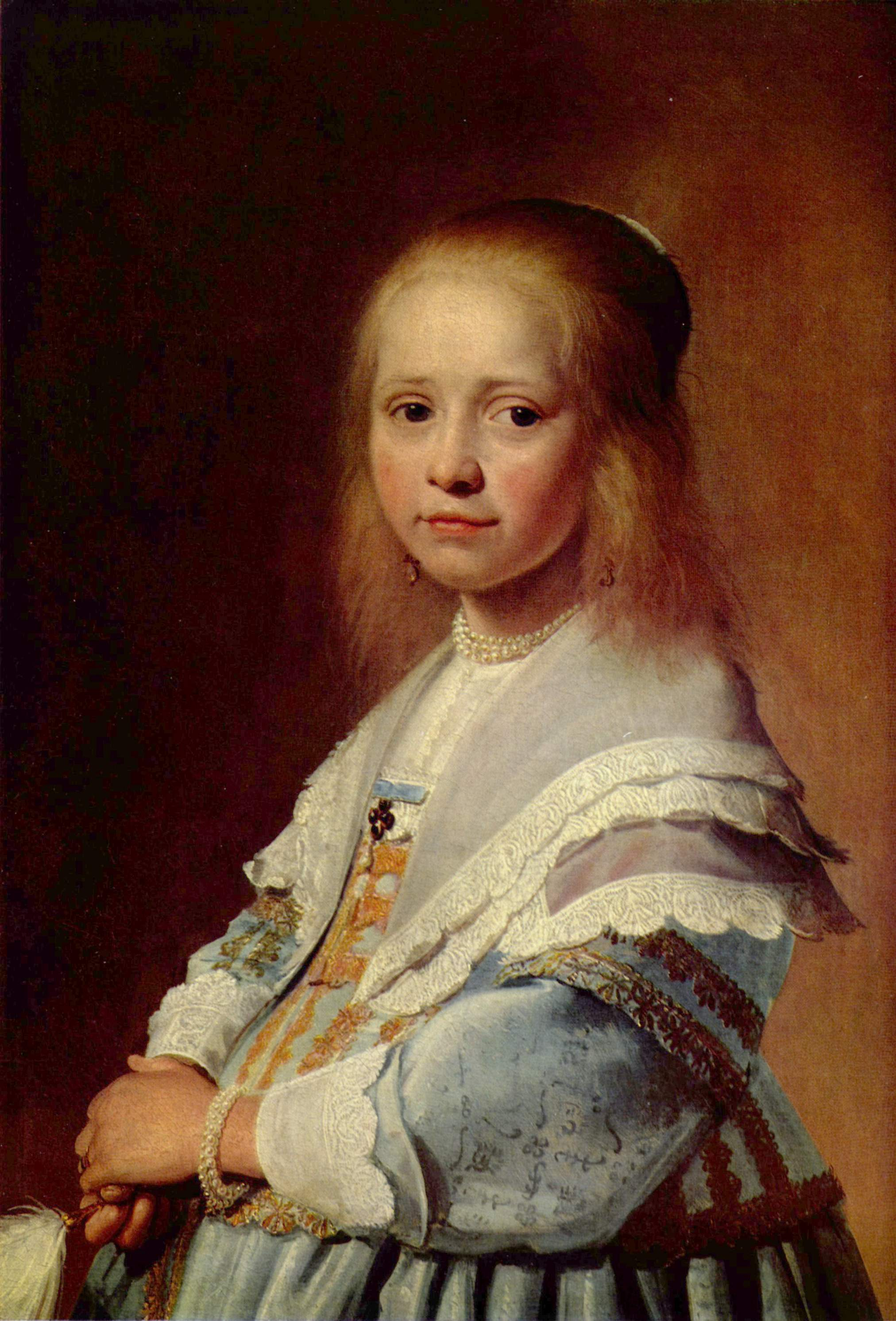
12 – Dutch, 1641

123– French, King Louis XIV and his brother, mid-1640s

== Simplicity of dress ==
In Protestant and Catholic countries, attempts were made to simplify and reform the extravagances of dress. Louis XIII issued sumptuary laws in 1629 and 1633 that prohibited lace, gold trim, and lavish embroidery for all but the highest nobility, and restricting puffs, slashes and bunches of ribbon. The effects of this reform effort are depicted in a series of popular engravings by Abraham Bosse.

=== Puritan dress ===
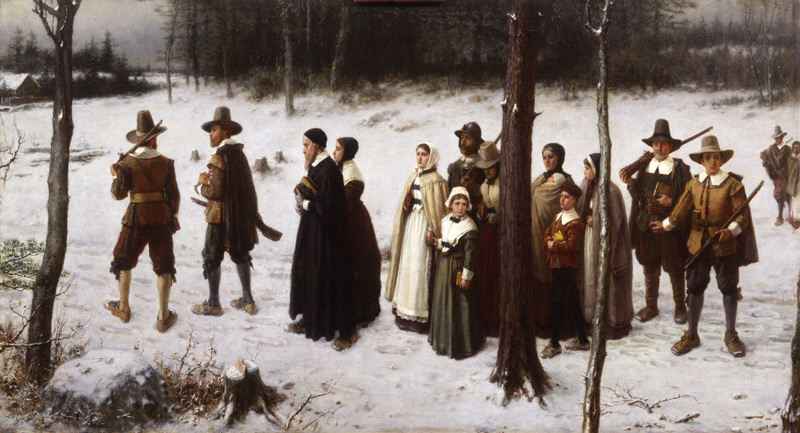
Pilgrims Going to Church by George Henry Boughton (1867)

Puritans advocated a conservative form of fashionable attire, characterized by sadd colors and modest cuts. Gowns with low necklines were filled in with high-necked smocks and wide collars. Married women covered their hair with a linen cap, over which they might wear a tall black hat. Men and women avoided bright colours, shiny fabrics and over-ornamentation.

Contrary to popular belief, most Puritans and Calvinists did not wear black for everyday, especially in England, Scotland and colonial America. Black dye was expensive and faded quickly. Therefore, black clothing was generally reserved for the most formal occasions (including having one's portrait painted), for elders in a community and for those of higher rank. Richer puritans, like their Dutch Calvinist contemporaries, probably did wear it often but in silk, often patterned. Typical colours for most were brown, murrey (mulberry, a brownish-maroon), dull greens and tawny colours. Wool and linen were preferred over silks and satins, though Puritan women of rank wore modest amounts of lace and embroidery as appropriate to their station, believing that the various ranks of society were divinely ordained and should be reflected even in the most modest dress. William Perkins wrote "...that apparel is necessary for Scholar, the Tradesman, the Countryman, the Gentleman; which serveth not only to defend their bodies from cold, but which belongs also to the place, degree, calling, and condition of them all" (Cases of Conscience, 1616).

Some Puritans rejected the long, curled hair as effeminate and favoured a shorter fashion which led to the nickname Roundheads for adherents of the English Parliamentary party but the taste for lavish or simple dress cut across both parties in the English Civil War.

== Working class clothing ==
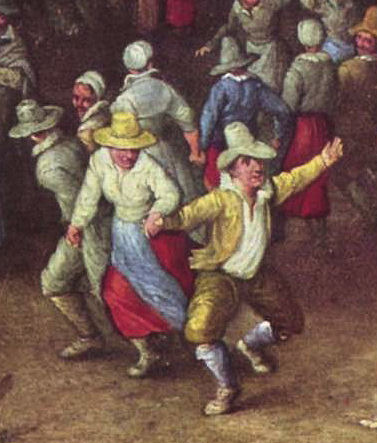
1 – c.1608

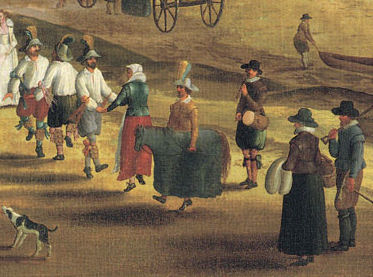
2 – c.1620

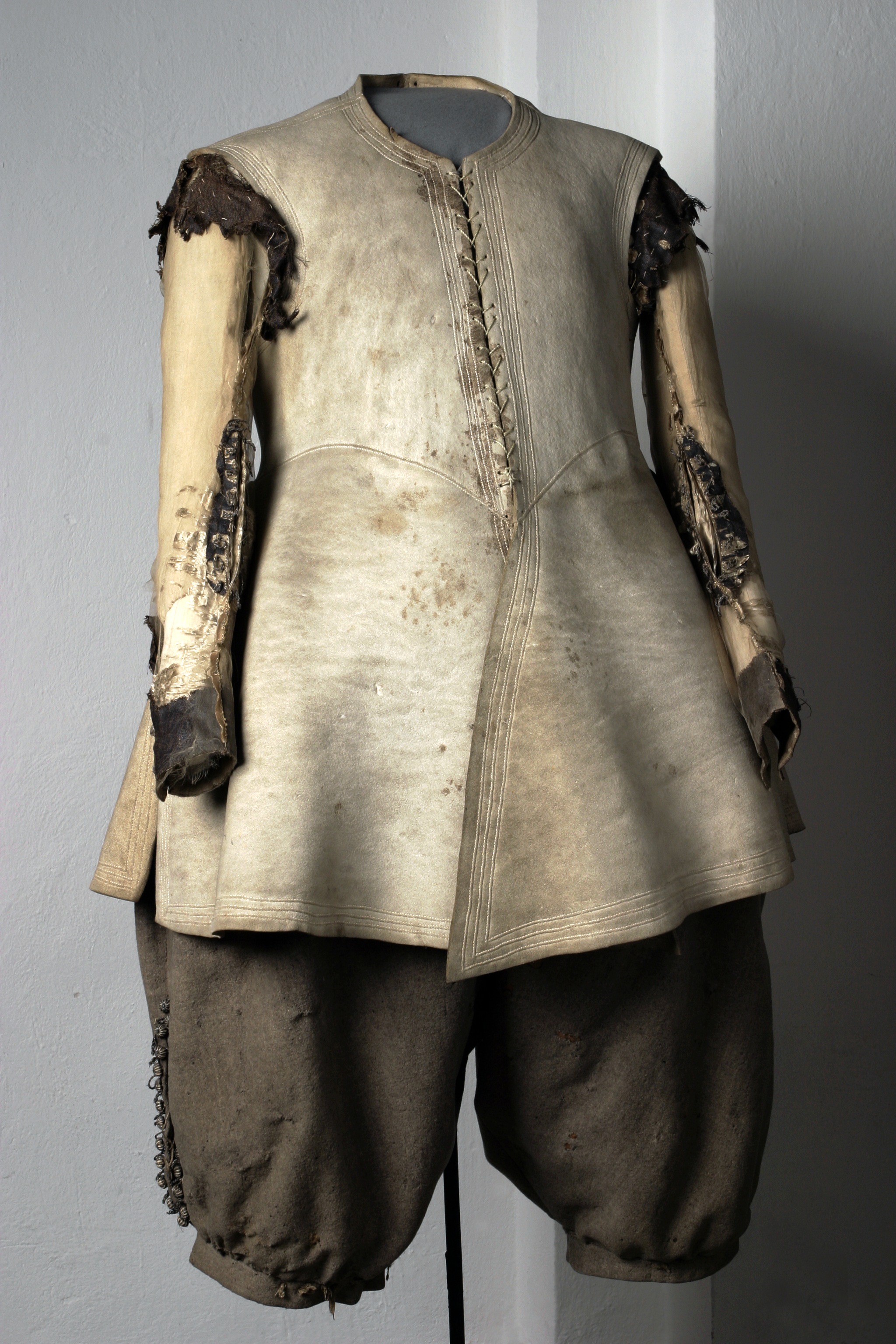
3 – 1627

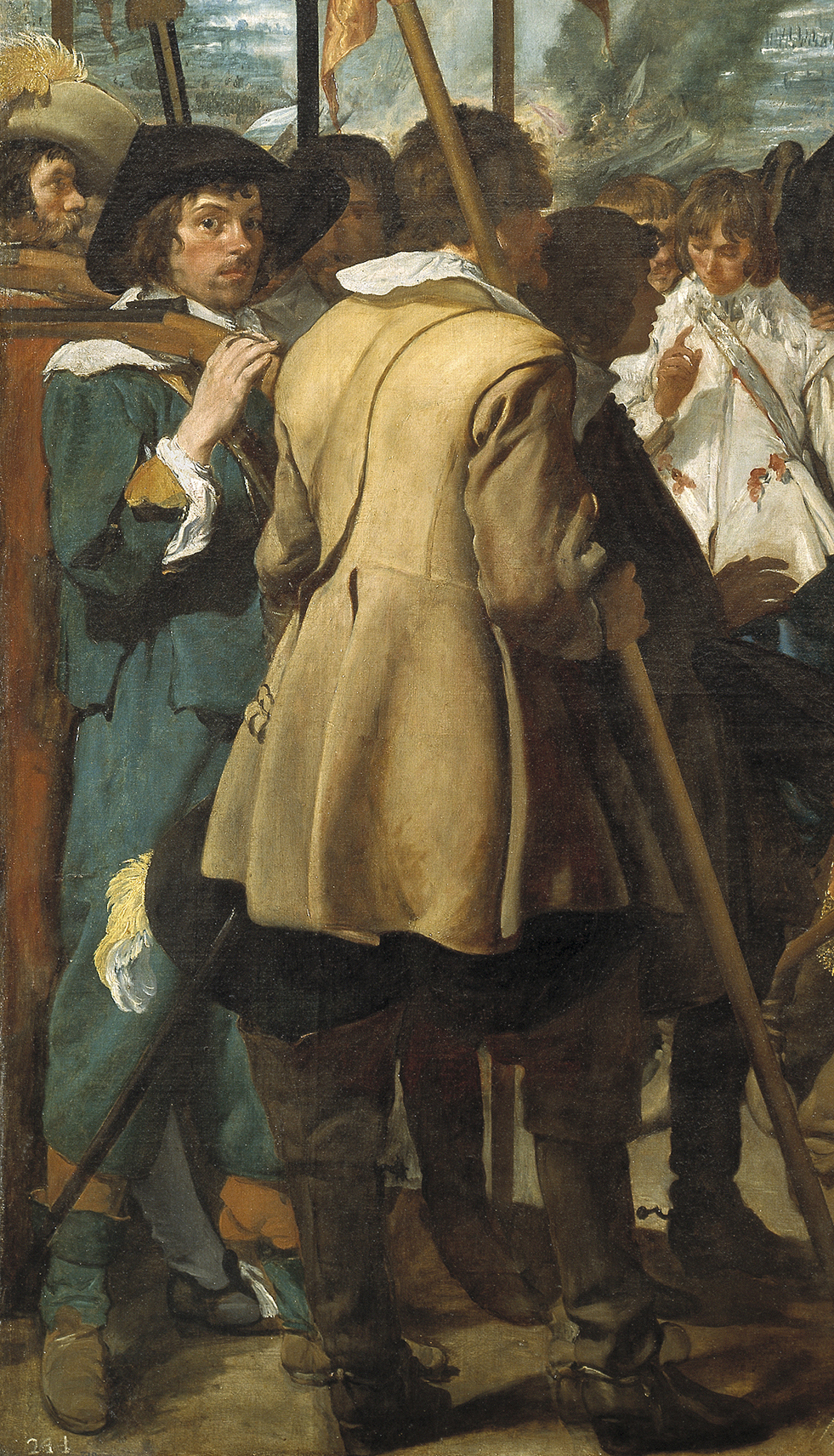
4 – c.1635

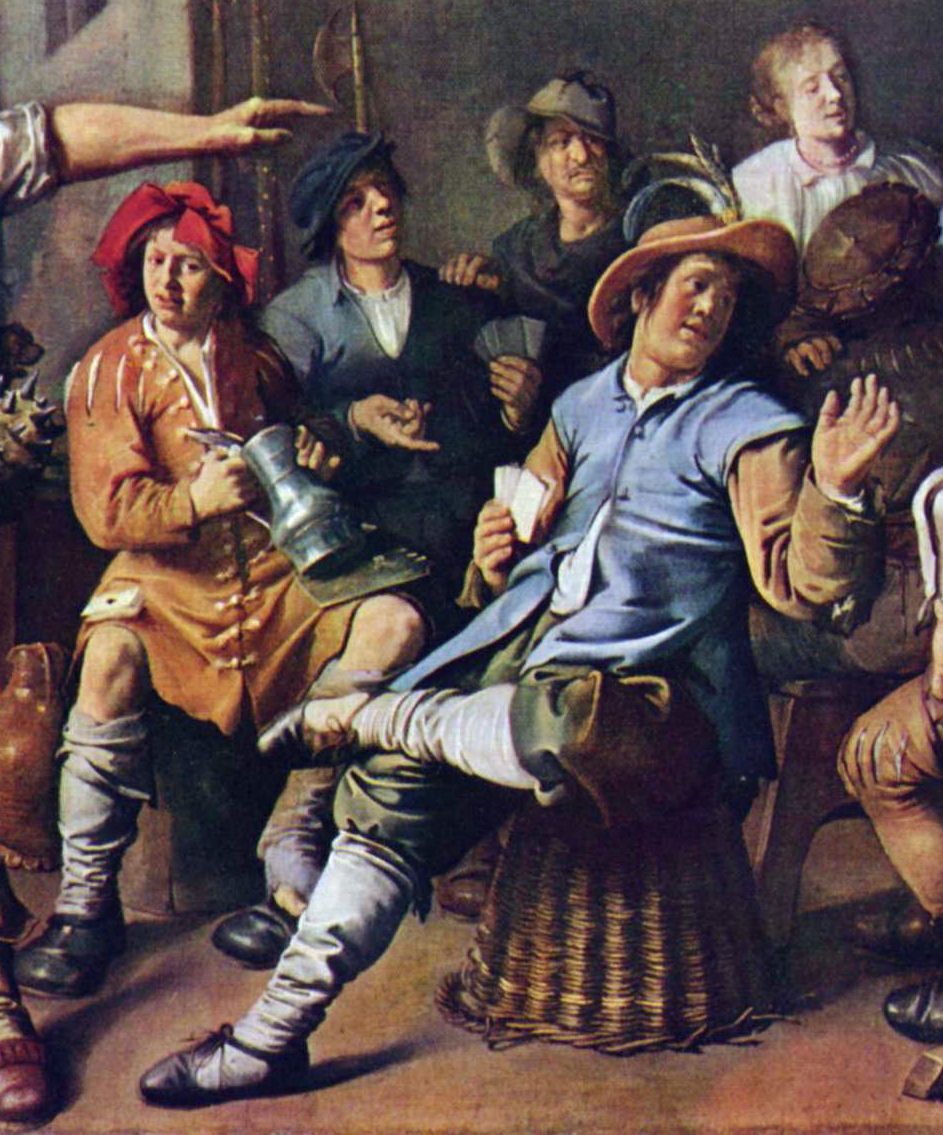
5 – 1636

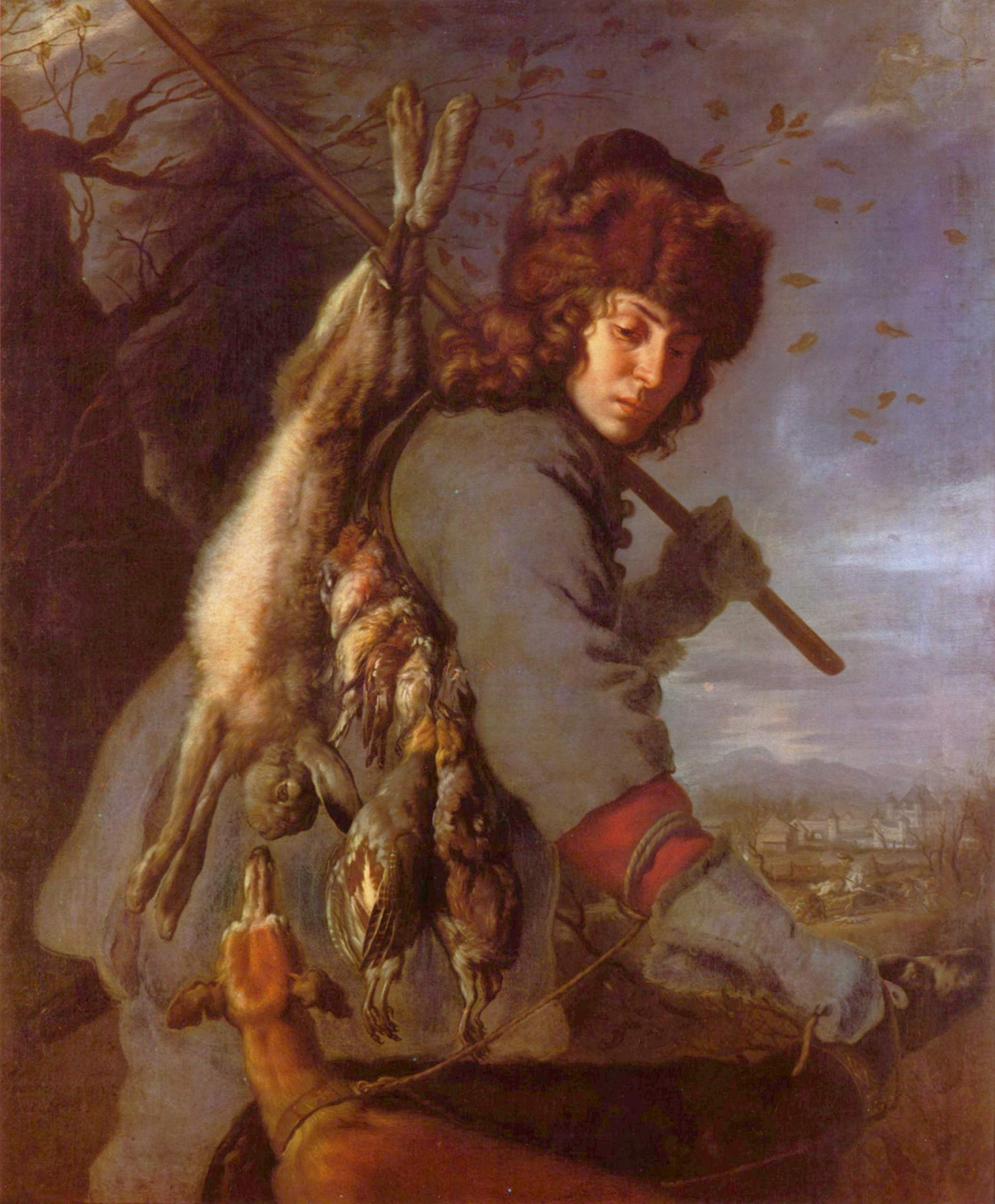
6 – 1643
1. Flemish country folk: Men wear tall capotain hats; women wear similar hats or linen headdresses, 1608.
2. English country folk watching Morris dancers and a hobby horse wear broad-brimmed hats. The woman wears a jacket-bodice and contrasting petticoat. Men wear full breeches and doublets, c. 1620.
3. Army Clothing: Buff coat made of moose hide, and breeches made of wadmal with linen linings, worn by Gustav II Adolf at the Battle of Dirschau in August 1627
4. Musketeer and pikeman, c. 1635. The pikeman on the right wears a full-skirted buff coat. Spanish, before 1635.
5. Men in a tavern wear floppy hats, wrinkled stockings and long, high-waisted jerkins, some with sleeves, and blunt-toed shoes.
6. Man hunting small game wears a grey buttoned jerkin with short sleeves and matching breeches over a red doublet. He wears a fur-lined hat and grey gloves, Germany, 1643.
