= Periwinkle =

Periwinkle may refer to:

== Fauna ==
- Periwinkle, a common name for a number of gastropod molluscs in the family Littorinidae
  - Common periwinkle (Littorina littorea)
  - Austrolittorina unifasciata
- Periwinkle, a regional name for the caddisfly larva
- Tegula pfeifferi

== Flora ==
- Catharanthus or Madagascar periwinkles
  - Catharanthus roseus or rosy periwinkle
- Vinca or European periwinkles
  - Vinca major or greater periwinkle
  - Vinca minor or lesser periwinkle
  - Vinca herbacea or herbaceous periwinkle

== Arts and entertainment ==
- Periwinkle (film), a 1917 silent film by James Kirkwood
- Tribulation Periwinkle, protagonist of Hospital Sketches, an 1863 compilation of sketches by Louisa May Alcott
- Periwinkle, a character in Blue's Clues and Blue's Clues & You!
- Periwinkle, a character in The Bellflower Bunnies
- Periwinkle, a character in the 2012 animated film Secret of the Wings from Disney, Tinker Bell's twin sister
- Periwinkle, the main character in Patricia A. McKillip's book The Changeling Sea

== People ==
- Pauline Periwinkle (1863–1916), American journalist, poet, teacher, feminist

== Other uses ==
- Periwinkle (color), a pale shade of blue
- HMS Periwinkle (K55), a Royal Navy corvette that served in the Second World War
- USS Periwinkle (1864), a steamer procured by the Union Navy during the American Civil War
- Periwinkle Run, a stream in Ohio
