= Vinervine =

Vinca alkaloid

Names
- IUPAC name Methyl (19E)-12-hydroxy-2,16-didehydrocur-19-en-17-oate

Identifiers
CAS Number	1963-86-6
3D model (JSmol)	Interactive image
ChEBI	CHEBI:70500
ChemSpider	65322594
PubChem CID	6875257
UNII	QJ6XQD4UFS
CompTox Dashboard (EPA)	DTXSID301140692
- InChI: InChI=1S/C20H22N2O3/c1-3-11-10-22-8-7-20-13-5-4-6-14(23)17(13)21-18(20)16(19(24)25-2)12(11)9-15(20)22/h3-6,12,15,21,23H,7-10H2,1-2H3/b11-3-/t12-,15-,20+/m0/s1 Key: FAJVFJABOWWACZ-GGGKWMOSSA-N
- SMILES: C/C=C\1/CN2CC[C@@]34[C@@H]2C[C@@H]1C(=C3NC5=C4C=CC=C5O)C(=O)OC

Properties
Chemical formula	C_{24}H_{39}NO_{7}
Molar mass	453.576 g·mol^{−1}
- Except where otherwise noted, data are given for materials in their standard state (at 25 °C [77 °F], 100 kPa). Infobox references

Vinervine is a monoterpene indole alkaloid of the Vinca sub-group. It is a derivative of akuammicine, with one additional hydroxy (OH) group in the indole portion, hence it is also known as 12-hydroxyakuammicine.

== History ==
The alkaloids are a large group of natural products which are classified according to the part-structure which members of a particular group contain. Vinervine is a monoterpene indole alkaloid of the Vinca sub-group which shares a common biosynthesis with other members, namely that they are derived from strictosidine. It was first characterised in 1964 and the structures of closely related materials including akuammicine were confirmed in 1983.

== Natural occurrence ==
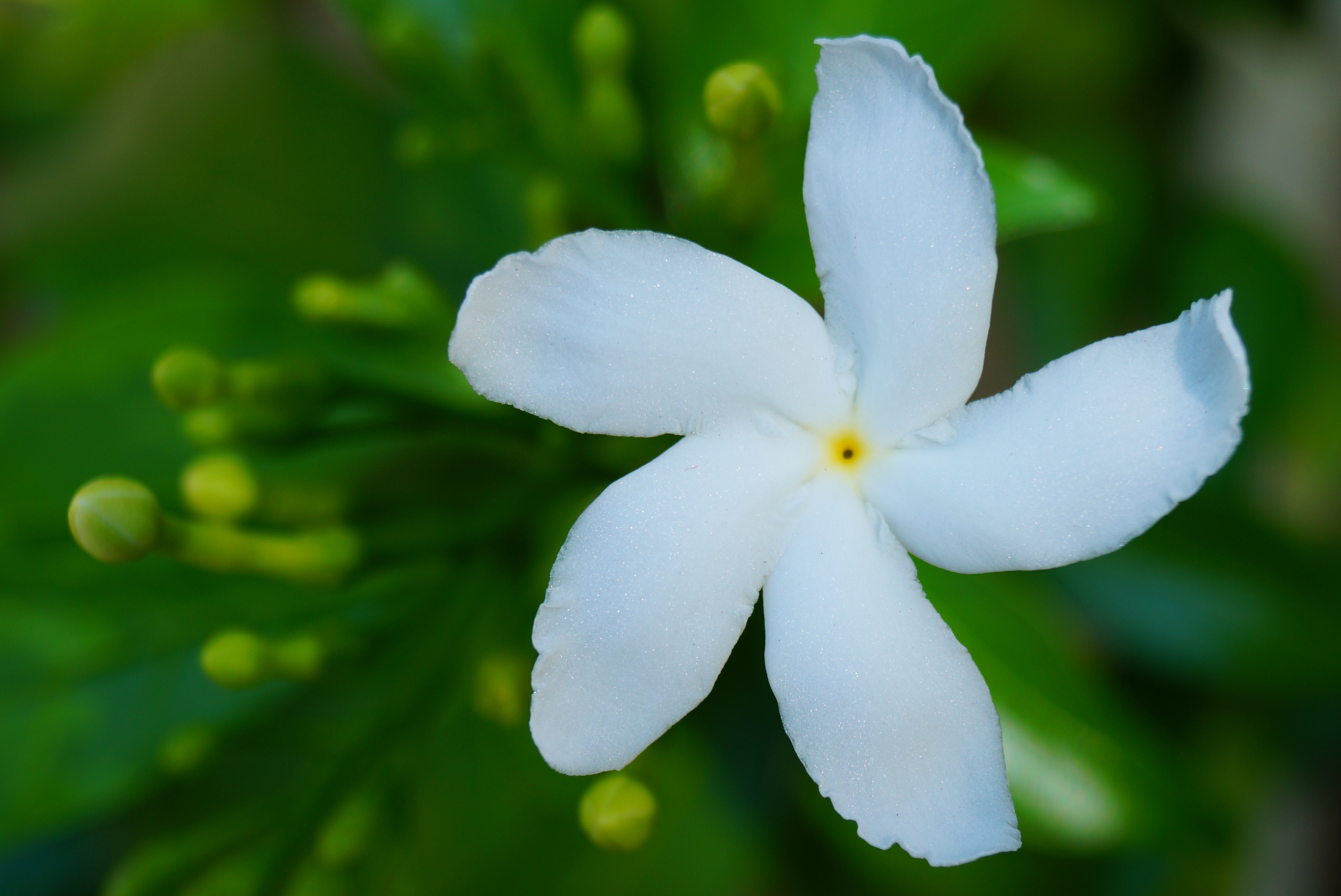
Crape Jasmine (Tabernaemontana divaricata), a source of vinervine

Vinervine is found in a variety of plants of the Apocynaceae family, including Vinca erecta, Tabernaemontana divaricata and several other flowering plants species that are native to Africa, Asia, and Europe.

== Biosynthesis ==
As with other indole alkaloids, the biosynthesis of vinervine starts from the amino acid tryptophan. This is converted into strictosidine before further elaboration.

== Research ==
Plant metabolites have long been studied for their biological activity and alkaloids in particular are major subjects for ethnobotanical research. However, vinervine has had little reported utility.

== See also ==
- Conophylline
- Vobtusine
- Rauwolscine
- Yohimbine
