= C22H26N2O5 =

The molecular formula C_{22}H_{26}N_{2}O_{5} may refer to:

- FV-100, an orally available nucleoside analogue drug with antiviral activity
- Vineridine, a vinca alkaloid
