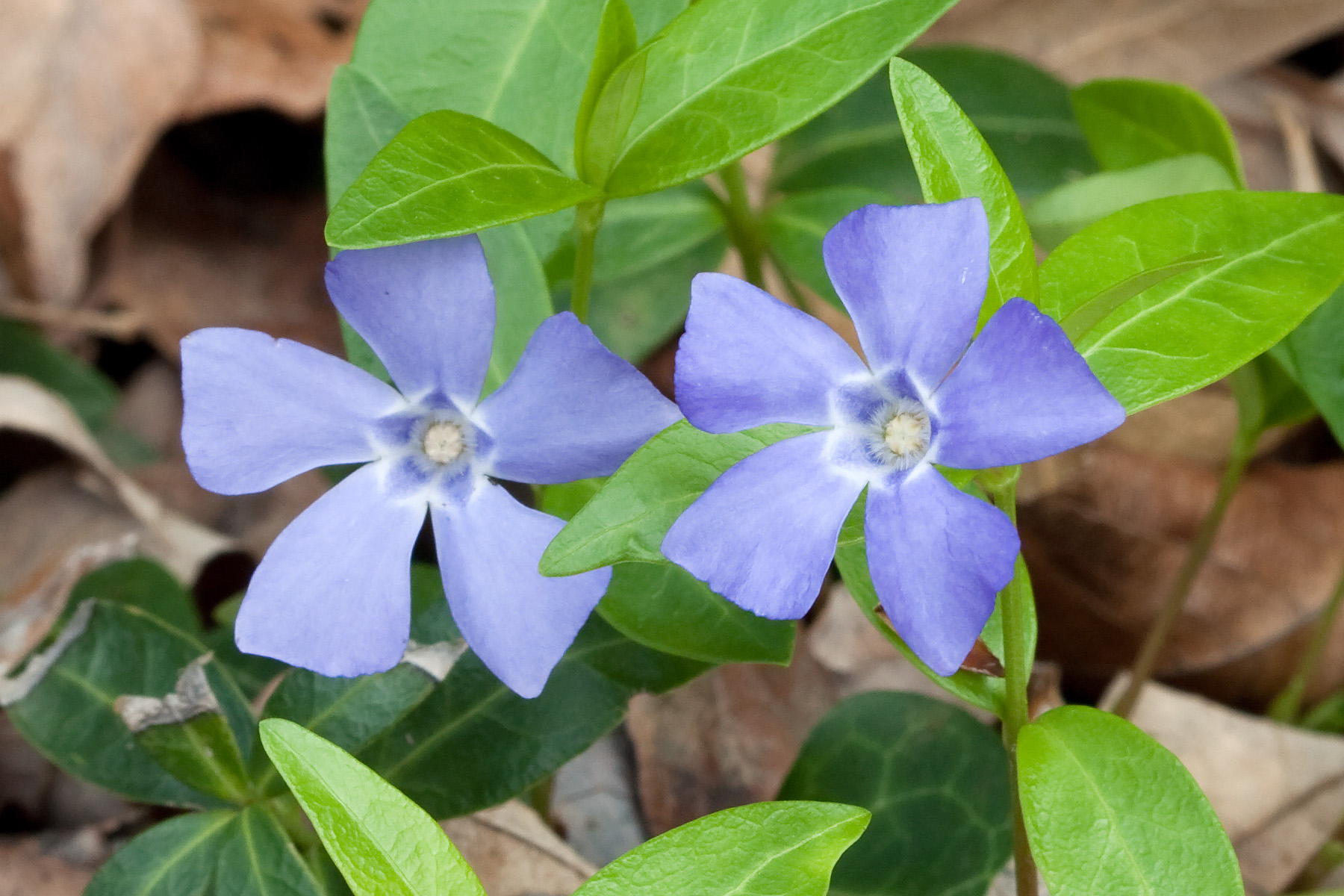

Scientific classification
- Kingdom: Plantae
- Clade: Tracheophytes
- Clade: Angiosperms
- Clade: Eudicots
- Clade: Asterids
- Order: Gentianales
- Family: Apocynaceae
- Genus: Vinca
- Species: V. minor

Binomial name
- Vinca minor L.

= Vinca minor =

Species of flowering plant in the dogbane family

Vinca minor (common names lesser periwinkle or also dwarf periwinkle) is a species of flowering plant in the dogbane family, native to central and southern Europe. Other vernacular names used in cultivation include small periwinkle, common periwinkle, and sometimes in the United States, myrtle or creeping myrtle.

== Description ==
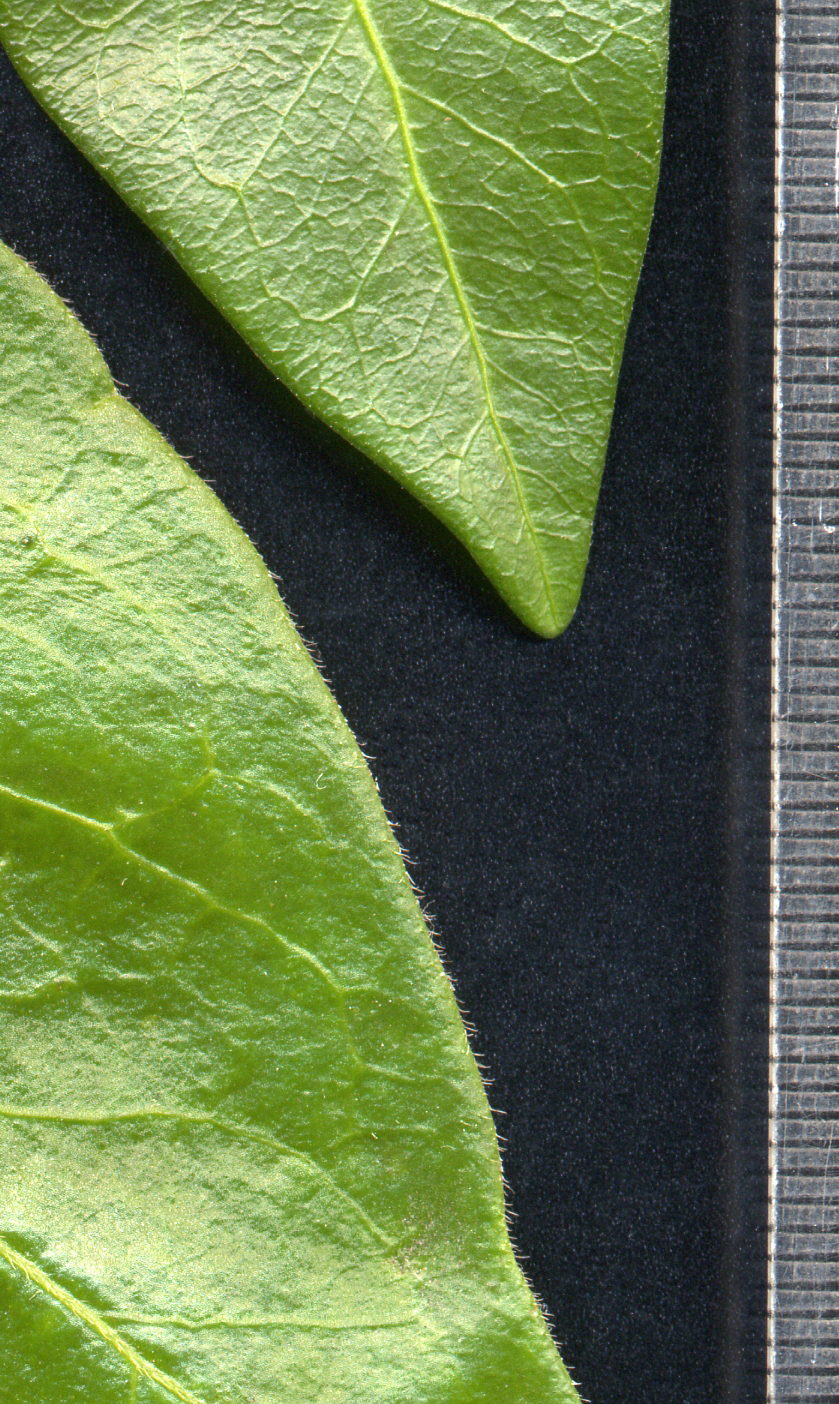
Leaf of Vinca minor above, V. major below (with hairy margin). Scale in mm.

Vinca minor is a trailing subshrub, spreading along the ground and rooting along the stems to form large clonal colonies and occasionally scrambling up to 40 centimetres (16 in) high but never twining or climbing. The leaves are evergreen, opposite, 2–4.5 cm (3/4–1 3/4 in) long and 1–2.5 cm (1/2–1 in) broad, glossy dark green with a leathery texture and an entire margin.

The flowers are solitary in the leaf axils and are produced mainly from early spring to mid summer but with a few flowers still produced into the autumn; they are violet-purple (pale purple or white in some cultivated selections), 2–3 cm (3/4–1 1/4 in) diameter, with a five-lobed corolla. The fruit is a pair of follicles 2.5 cm (1 in) long, containing numerous seeds.

=== Chemistry ===
Vinca minor contains more than 50 alkaloids, including vincamine. Other alkaloids include reserpine, rescinnamine, akuammicine, majdine, vinerine, ervine, vineridine, tombozine, vincamajine, vincanine, vincanidine, vinburnine, apovincamine, vincaminol, desoxyvincaminol, vincorine and perivincine.

=== Similar species ===
The closely related Vinca major is similar, but larger in all parts, and also has relatively broader leaves with a hairy margin.

== Distribution and habitat ==
Vinca minor is native to central and southern Europe, from Portugal and France north to the Netherlands and the Baltic states, east to the Caucasus, and also southwestern Asia in Turkey.

== Invasiveness ==
It is considered an invasive species in some areas of the United States, primarily because of its ability to form dense and extensive mats along the forest floor, displacing native herbaceous and woody plant species.

The species has few pests or diseases outside its native range and is widely naturalized as a result. Invasion can be restricted by removal of rooting stems in spring. Once established, it is difficult to eradicate, as its waxy leaves shed most water-based herbicide sprays. Spraying with glyphosate easily kills the plant in 2–3 weeks. Removal involves cutting, followed by immediate application of concentrated glyphosate or triclopyr to the cut stems. Repeated chemical treatments may be necessary, along with digging up the roots where feasible.

== Cultivation ==
The species is commonly grown as a groundcover in temperate gardens for its evergreen foliage, spring and summer flowers, ease of culture, and dense habit that smothers most weeds. It was once commonly planted in cemeteries in parts of the Southern U.S. and naturalized periwinkle may indicate the presence of graves whose other markers have disappeared.

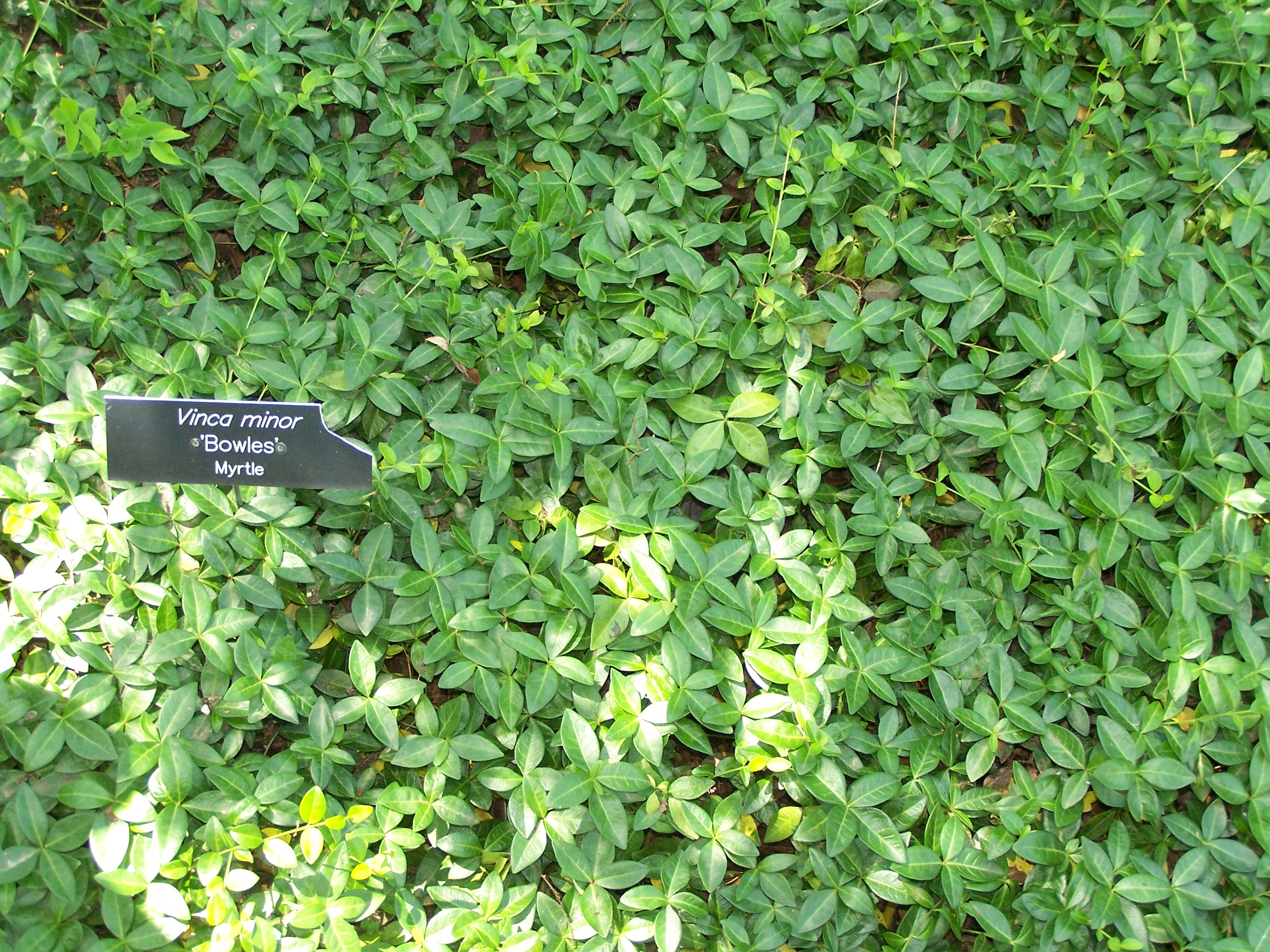
Dense groundcover

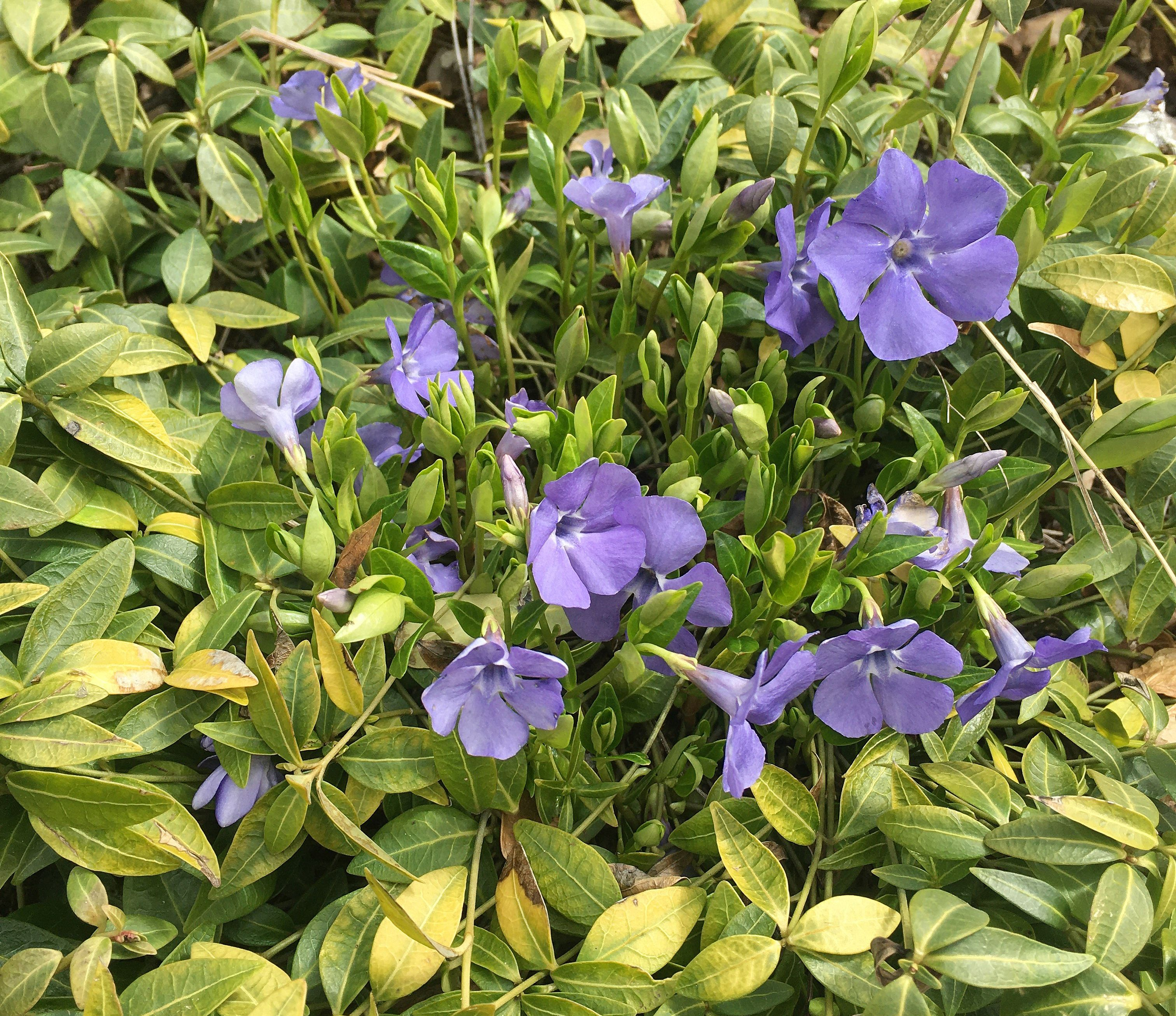
In castle ruins

=== Cultivars ===
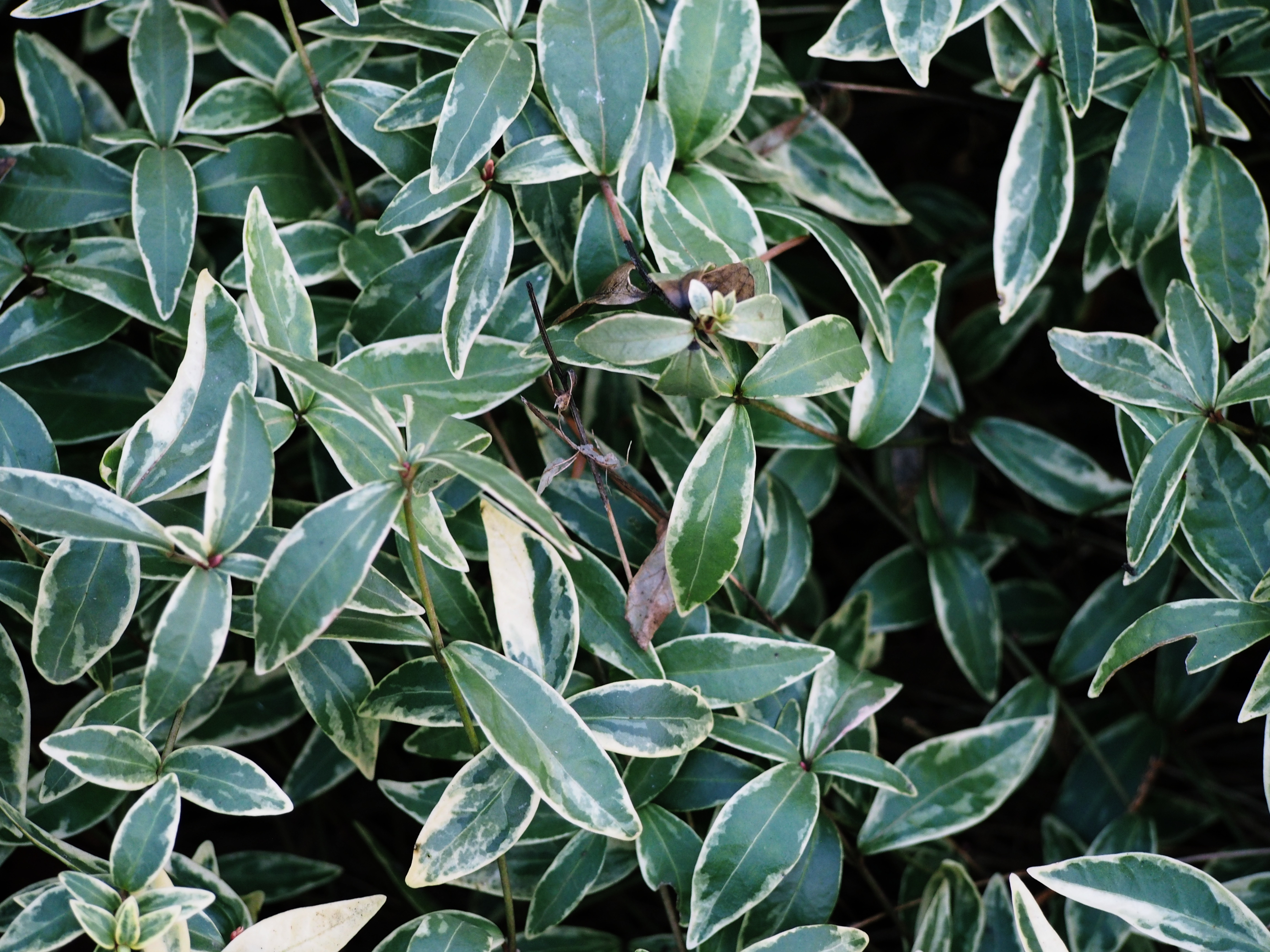
Cv. 'Argenteovariegata'

There are numerous cultivars, with different flower colours and variegated foliage. Many have a less vigorous habit than the species, and are therefore more suitable for smaller gardens. The following cultivars have gained the Royal Horticultural Society's Award of Garden Merit:

- 'Argenteovariegata' (leaves have creamy white margins)
- 'Atropurpurea' (burgundy-purple flowers)
- 'Azurea Flore Pleno' (double blue flowers)
- 'Bowles's Variety' (violet-blue flowers: also known as 'Bowles's Blue' and 'La Grave')
- 'Ralph Shugert'

== Uses ==
Vinpocetine (brand names: Cavinton, Intelectol; chemical name: ethyl apovincaminate) is a semisynthetic derivative alkaloid of vincamine with purported medicinal uses.

== In culture ==
The colour name periwinkle is derived from the flower.
