= Majdine =

Names
- IUPAC name Methyl 11,12-dimethoxy-19α-methyl-2-oxo-20α-formosanan-16-carboxylate
- Systematic IUPAC name Methyl (1′S,3R,4′aS,5′aS,10′aS)-6,7-dimethoxy-1′-methyl-2-oxo-1,2,4′a,5′,5′a,7′,8′,10′a-octahydro-1′H,10′H-spiro[indole-3,6′-pyrano[3,4-f]indolizine]-4′-carboxylate

Identifiers
CAS Number	20497-42-1
3D model (JSmol)	Interactive image
ChEMBL	ChEMBL2333535
ChemSpider	10254858
PubChem CID	21627963
CompTox Dashboard (EPA)	DTXSID101045723
- InChI: InChI=1S/C23H28N2O6/c1-12-14-10-25-8-7-23(18(25)9-13(14)15(11-31-12)21(26)30-4)16-5-6-17(28-2)20(29-3)19(16)24-22(23)27/h5-6,11-14,18H,7-10H2,1-4H3,(H,24,27)/t12-,13-,14-,18-,23+/m0/s1 Key: TTZWEOINXHJHCY-UHJVZONPSA-N; InChI=1/C23H28N2O6/c1-12-14-10-25-8-7-23(18(25)9-13(14)15(11-31-12)21(26)30-4)16-5-6-17(28-2)20(29-3)19(16)24-22(23)27/h5-6,11-14,18H,7-10H2,1-4H3,(H,24,27)/t12-,13-,14-,18-,23+/m0/s1 Key: TTZWEOINXHJHCY-UHJVZONPBK
- SMILES: C[C@H]1[C@@H]2CN3CC[C@]4([C@@H]3C[C@@H]2C(=CO1)C(=O)OC)C5=C(C(=C(C=C5)OC)OC)NC4=O

Properties
Chemical formula	C_{23}H_{28}N_{2}O_{6}
Molar mass	428.485 g·mol^{−1}
- Except where otherwise noted, data are given for materials in their standard state (at 25 °C [77 °F], 100 kPa). Infobox references

Majdine is a chemical compound, specifically an alkaloid isolated from Vinca minor and Vinca herbacea. It has potential medicinal properties and is being studied for its various effects.
