= Akuammicine =

Alkaloid

Names
- IUPAC name Methyl (19E)-2,16-didehydrocur-19-en-17-oate

Identifiers
| CAS Number | 639-43-0 |
| 3D model (JSmol) | Interactive image |
| ChEBI | CHEBI:70499 |
| ChemSpider | 8489522 |
| PubChem CID | 10314057 |
| UNII | RG055O00BG |
| CompTox Dashboard (EPA) | DTXSID30903914 |
- InChI: InChI=1S/C20H22N2O2/c1-3-12-11-22-9-8-20-14-6-4-5-7-15(14)21-18(20)17(19(23)24-2)13(12)10-16(20)22/h3-7,13,16,21H,8-11H2,1-2H3/b12-3-/t13-,16-,20+/m0/s1 Key: AGZMFTKKLPHOMT-DUJTVWLASA-N
- SMILES: C123C(=C(C4CC1N(CC3)CC4=CC)C(OC)=O)Nc1c2cccc1

Properties
| Chemical formula | C_{20}H_{22}N_{2}O_{2} |
| Molar mass | 322.408 g·mol^{−1} |
| Appearance | Colourless solid |
| Melting point | 182 °C (360 °F; 455 K) |
| Acidity (pK_{a}) | 7.45 |
- Except where otherwise noted, data are given for materials in their standard state (at 25 °C [77 °F], 100 kPa). Infobox references

Akuammicine is a monoterpene indole alkaloid of the Vinca sub-group. It is found in the Apocynaceae family of plants including Picralima nitida, Vinca minor and the Aspidosperma.

== History ==
The alkaloids are a large group of natural products which are classified according to the part-structure which members of a particular group contain. Akuammicine is a monoterpene indole alkaloid of the Vinca sub-group which shares a common biosynthesis with other members, namely that they are derived from strictosidine. It was first isolated in 1927 and had been investigated by Sir Robert Robinson and others before its structure was correctly deduced. This was confirmed by X-ray crystallography in 2017.

== Natural occurrence ==
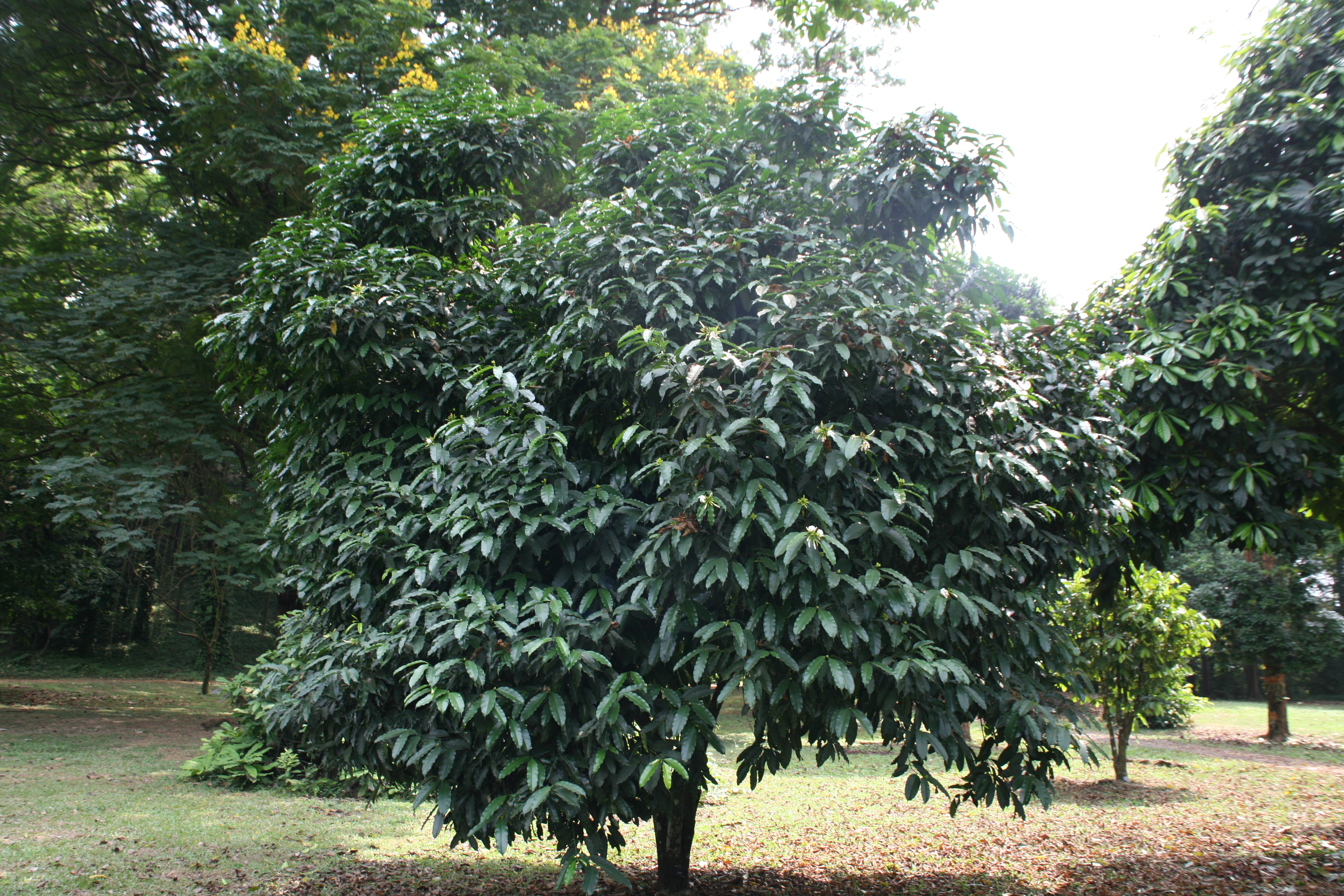
Picralima nitida, a source of akuammicine

Akuammicine is found in plants of the Apocynaceae family and was first isolated from Picralima nitida. It has also been reported in Catharanthus roseus.

== Synthesis ==
=== Biosynthesis ===
As with other indole alkaloids, the biosynthesis of akuammicine starts from the amino acid tryptophan. This is converted into strictosidine before further elaboration.

=== Chemical synthesis ===
Strychnine

Akuammicine has been a target for total synthesis, partly because of its relationship to the well-known alkaloid strychnine which has often attracted chemists in academia.

== Research ==
Plant metabolites have long been studied for their biological activity and alkaloids in particular are major subjects for ethnobotanical research. Akuammicine is reported to have effects on glucose uptake and be a κ- and μ-opioid receptor agonist.

== See also ==
- Ajmalicine
- Vinervine, the 12-hydroxy derivative
