= Sadd colors =

Clothing colors in colonial New England

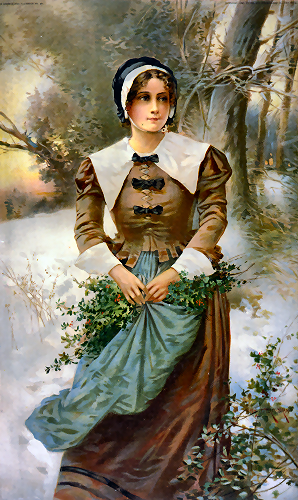
The subject of "A fair Puritan" wearing typical subdued "sadd" colors.

Sadd colors or sad colors were the colors of choice for the clothing of the members of the Massachusetts Bay Colony in seventeenth century America ("sadd"/"sad" carried the meaning of "seriousness" rather than "sorrowfulness"). The Puritans have often been depicted wearing simple black and white, but for them, the color "black" was itself considered too bold for regular use and was reserved for community elders and for highly formal occasions such as when having one's portrait painted. Black was considered so formal in part because black dye was difficult to obtain and black clothing had a tendency to fade to other colors rather quickly. The Puritans, then, designated a set of deliberately subdued colors which they called "sadd", for their everyday use.

== Colors ==
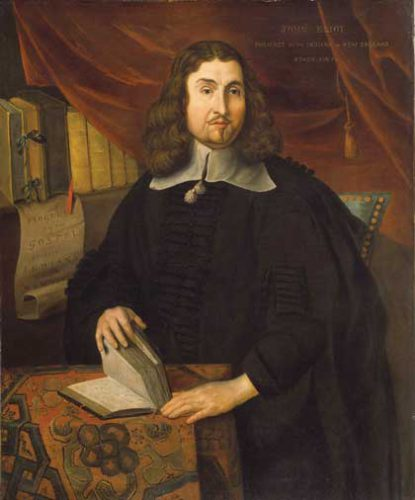
Portraits, especially of colonial officials and clergy, disproportionately showcase black clothing.

This list includes colors designated in Puritan Massachusetts, but is not exhaustive.

- liver color
- de Boys - the color of "the wood", from du bois in French
- tawney
- russet
- rust
- purple
- French green - a very pale shade of gray-green
- ginger lyne
- deer color
- orange
- gridolin - from the French gris de lin, "flax blossom", a color resembling periwinkle
- puce
- folding color
- Kendall green - a dark variety of French green
- Lincoln green - a more vivid shade of green akin to forest green
- barry
- milly
- tuly
- philly mort - from the French words feuille morte, "dead leaf", a dark gray-brown

== Example swatches ==
Liver #6C2E1F	Rust #B7410E	Puce #CC8899
Russet #80461B	Lincoln Green #195905	Gridolin #80667B
Kendall Green #527564	Tawney #A67B5B	Philly Mort #9E7824
