= Tombozine =

Identifiers
CAS Number	604-99-9
3D model (JSmol)	Interactive image
ChemSpider	28424456
PubChem CID	5460176
UNII	8RD788YSD2
- InChI: InChI=1S/C19H22N2O/c1-2-11-9-21-17-8-14-12-5-3-4-6-16(12)20-19(14)18(21)7-13(11)15(17)10-22/h2-6,13,15,17-18,20,22H,7-10H2,1H3/b11-2-/t13-,15?,17-,18-/m0/s1 Key: VXTDUGOBAOLMED-GJKVQYCKSA-N
- SMILES: C/C=C\1/CN2[C@H]3C[C@@H]1C([C@@H]2CC4=C3NC5=CC=CC=C45)CO

Properties
Chemical formula	C_{19}H_{22}N_{2}O
Molar mass	294.398 g·mol^{−1}
- Except where otherwise noted, data are given for materials in their standard state (at 25 °C [77 °F], 100 kPa). Infobox references

Tombozine is an alkaloid found in the plant species Vinca minor. The chemical has been found to have a sedative effect in mice and to lower blood pressure in some domesticated animals.

Ref:
