= T. V. Rajan Babu =

Organic chemist

T. V. (Babu) RajanBabu
- Born: T. V. RajanBabu
- Education: Ohio State University Ph.D (1977)
- Known for: Organometallic chemistry, Organic chemistry
- Awards: Arthur C. Cope Scholar Award (2020)
- Scientific career
- Fields: Chemistry
- Workplaces: Ohio State University
- Doctoral advisors: Harold Shechter
- Other academic advisors: Robert Burns Woodward
- Website: Faculty Page

T.V. (Babu) RajanBabu is an organic chemist who holds the position of distinguished professor of chemistry in the College of Arts and Sciences at the Ohio State University. His laboratory traditionally focuses on developing transition metal-catalyzed reactions. RajanBabu is known for helping develop the Nugent-RajanBabu reagent (Bis(cyclopentadienyl)titanium(III) chloride), a chemical reagent used in synthetic organic chemistry as a single electron reductant.

== Education and professional experience ==
RajanBabu received his BSc (special) from Kerala University in 1969 and M.Sc. degree from The Indian Institute of Technology (IIT, Madras) in 1971. He obtained his Ph.D. from The Ohio State University in 1979 working with Professor Harold Shechter, and was a postdoctoral fellow at Harvard University with Professor R. B. Woodward from 1978 to 1979. Notable work during his postdoctoral career includes the total synthesis of erythromycin. RajanBabu was a member of research staff and research fellow at DuPont Central Research from 1980 to 1994 until joining the Ohio State University faculty as a professor of chemistry in 1995.

== Research ==
Research in the RajanBabu lab is focused on development of new methodology for stereoselective synthesis. Major research areas include:

Asymmetric Hydrovinylation

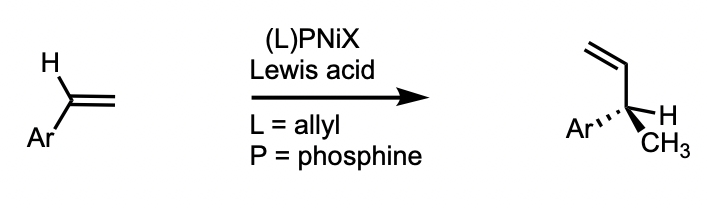

RajanBabu developed methodology surrounding C-C bond formation via metal-catalyzed hydroformylation. They reported several asymmetric examples through the usage of chiral phosphine ligand with a hemilabile coordinating group. This method was applicable using vinylarenes, 1,3-dienes and strained olefins as substrates. Applications of this chemistry include a new synthesis of (S)-ibuprofen and a new approach to controlling the exocyclic side-chain stereochemistry in helioporin D and pseudopterocins. Related to this methodology, RajanBabu also developed a tandem [2+2] cycloaddition/asymmetric hydrovinylation reaction to allow conversion of simple precursors (ethylene, enynes) to structurally complex cyclobutanes.

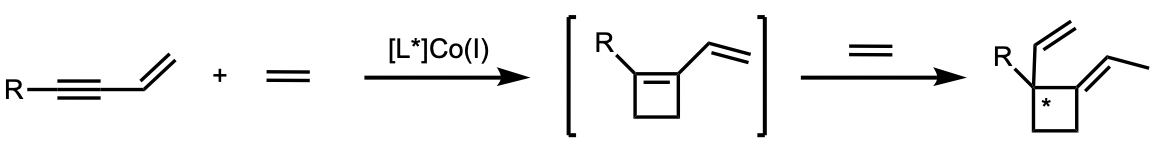

Asymmetric Hydrocyanation

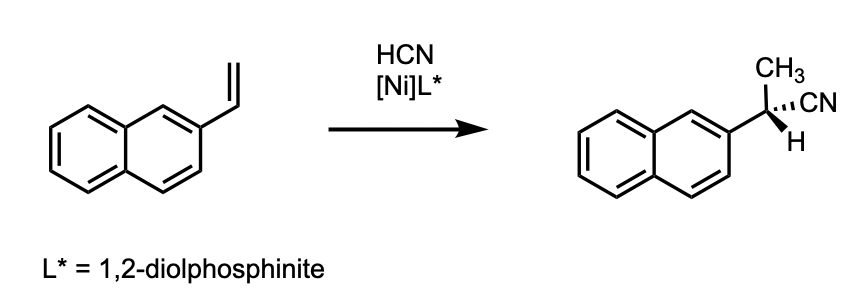

The RajanBabu group developed methodology in the area of hydrocyanation, leveraging the reaction of vinylarenes with HCN in the presence of Ni(0) complexes. Based on the phosphorus ligands within the Ni complex, the reaction can be rendered asymmetric. The enantioselectivity could be further improved by tuning the electronics of the phosphine ligands to electronically differentiate the phosphorus chelates. Electronic tuning was accomplished, for example, using widely available sugars such as D-glucose and D-fructose.

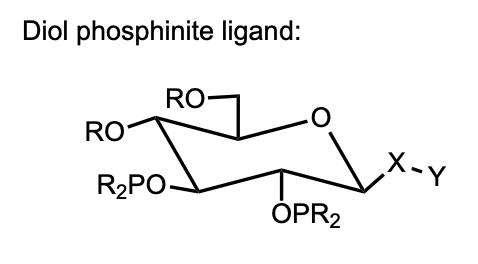

Radical Epoxide Opening

For further information on the Nugent-RajanBabu reagent, please see Bis(cyclopentadienyl)titanium(III) chloride.

Multicomponent Cyclization

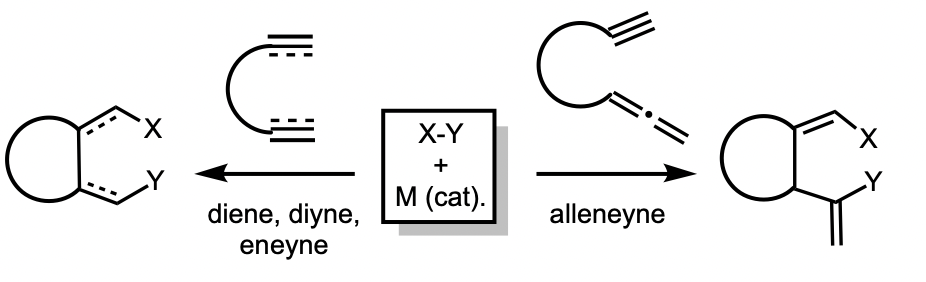

One area of interest to the RajanBabu group is catalytic multicomponent addition/cyclization reactions. This methodology allows for formation of carbocyclic and heterocyclic compounds from acyclic precursors including unactivated olefins and acetylenes. This method leverages the reactivity of bifunctional reagents (X-Y) where X-Y in above scheme can represent R_{3}Si−SiR‘_{3}, R_{3}Si−SnR‘_{3}, R_{3}Si−BR‘_{2}, R_{3}Sn−BR‘_{2}, and trialkylsilicon- and trialkyltin- hydrides. The reactions are palladium-catalyzed, and incorporation of the X and Y species allows for vast diversification of the end products. Application of this methodology afforded syntheses of highly alkylated indolizidines such as IND-223A.

Additional Methods

RajanBabu has evaluated asymmetric aziridine openings with high enantioselectivity using yttrium- and lanthanide- salen complexes. The RajanBabu group has also developed water-soluble Rhodium(I) complexes, allowing for reactions to be run in aqueous media.

== Publications ==
RajanBabu has over 160 publications to date and has co-authored several reviews and patents. His H-index is 56.

Notable publications include:

- Group-transfer polymerization. 1. A new concept for addition polymerization with organosilicon initiators
- Selective Generation of Free Radicals from Epoxides Using a Transition-Metal Radical. A Powerful New Tool for Organic Synthesis
- Transition-metal-centered radicals in organic synthesis. Titanium(III)-induced cyclization of epoxy olefins
- Ligand Electronic Effects in Asymmetric Catalysis: Enhanced Enantioselectivity in the Asymmetric Hydrocyanation of Vinylarenes
- Beyond Nature's Chiral Pool - Enantioselective Catalysis in Industry

== Honors ==
- Arthur C. Cope Scholar Awards (2020)
- Chemical Research Society of India Medal (2013)
- Fellow of the American Association for the Advancement of Science (2012)
- Distinguished Alumnus, Indian Institute of Technology, Madras (2008)
