= Vinca erecta =

Scientific classification
- Kingdom: Plantae
- Clade: Tracheophytes
- Clade: Angiosperms
- Clade: Eudicots
- Clade: Asterids
- Order: Gentianales
- Family: Apocynaceae
- Genus: Vinca
- Species: V. erecta

Binomial name
- Vinca erecta Regel & Schmalh.

Species of flowering plant

Vinca erecta is a species of flowering plant in the family Apocynaceae.

It is native from Central Asia to Northeast Afghanistan.
