= Pastel (color) =

Family of pale colors

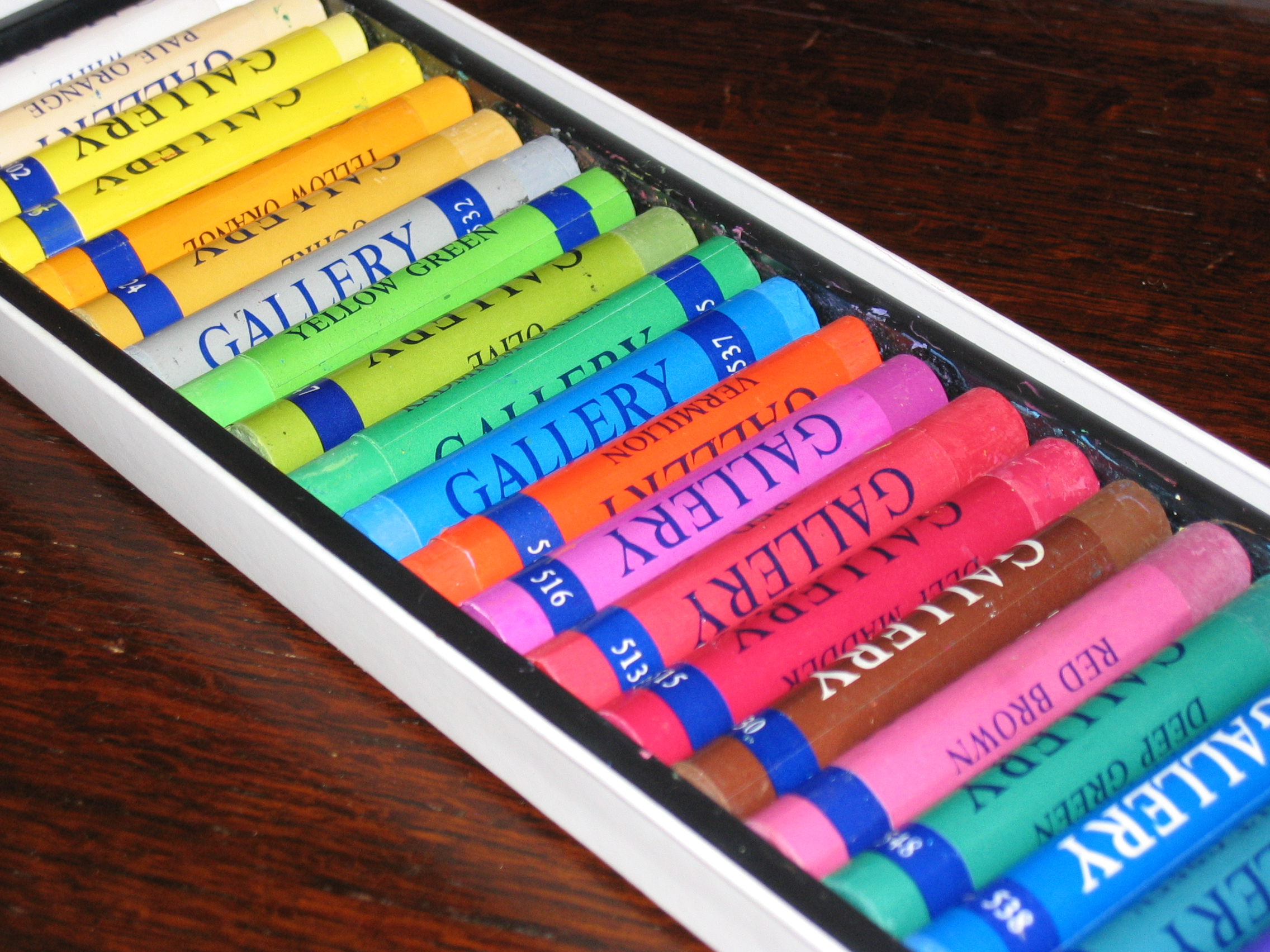
- Pastel sticks in a variety of colors

Common connotations
- Soothing

Pastels or pastel colors belong to a pale family of colors, which, when described in the HSV color space, have high value and low or medium saturation. They are named after the artistic medium made from pigment and solid binding agents, similar to crayons. Pastel sticks historically had lower saturation than paints of the same pigment, hence the name of this color family.

The colors of this family are usually described as soothing, calming, and nostalgic. They tend to lean towards ideas of simplicity and help to contrast against the bolder and brighter colors that trend in our world. They are integrated into interior design in many places, such as healthcare to help soothe anxiety, or in classrooms to help the mind focus. Pastel colors work to oppose the brighter, bolder colors that tend to be common in many other places.

Pink, mauve, and baby blue are commonly used pastel colors, as are mint green, peach, periwinkle, lilac, and lavender. There are no official listing of colors' hex codes, but there are still websites with given color names and hex codes that can be used to find pastel colors. There are also color charts that can be used to physically identify pastel colors.

== Pastels in popular culture ==
Trends involving pastel colors have maintained cultural relevance in both fashion and interior design. The art deco period of the 1920s and 30s involved pastels greatly in their designs. After this, the 1940s and 50s involved pastels in their interior design, known now as "retro" design, with an association of elegance. Pastels had another rise in popularity around the 1980s specifically in men's fashion. Suits that were pastel in their color started to become very popular around this time, often associated feelings of confidence and coolness. In modern day, pastels are still integrated into interior design, and the idea of pastel colors in fashion has only broadened its scope to being used in a variety of settings.

Pastel colors are valued in fashion because of their ability to match with a variety of other color types. They can be combined with blacks and whites to help contrast the colors more, mixed with other pastels to help bring out a monochromatic look. They are also complimentary to many skin tones, making them accessible to all.

While associated feelings have changed within given time periods and their trends, the root of pastels' association is still with relaxation, harmony, and gentleness. They are meant to be used in a variety of scenarios and remain pleasing to the eye and mind.

== Examples ==
Examples of pastels in HEX-code
| fea3aa | f8b88b | faf884 |
| baed91 | b2cefe | f2a2e8 |

== Gallery ==
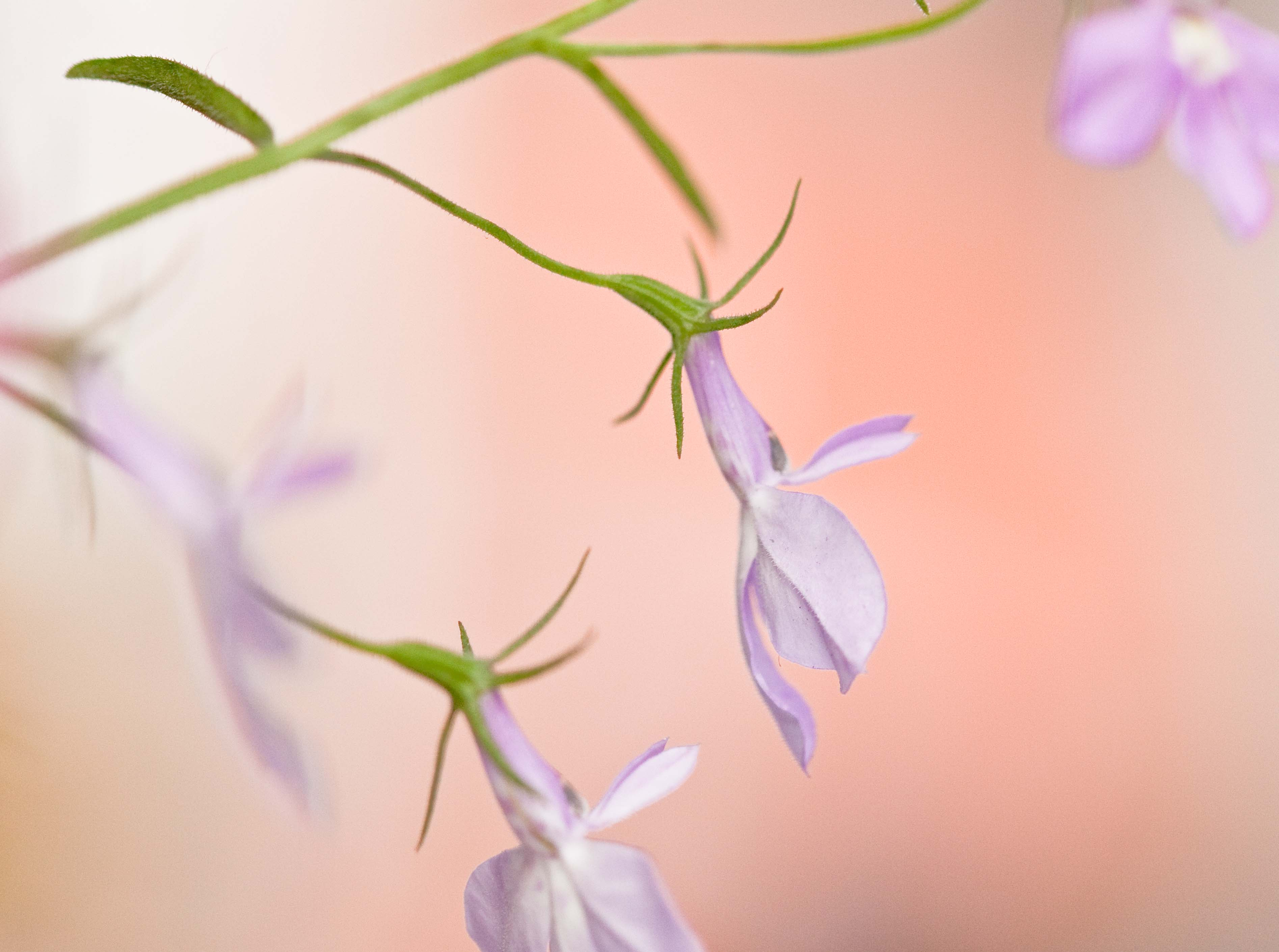
Gaiety pastels

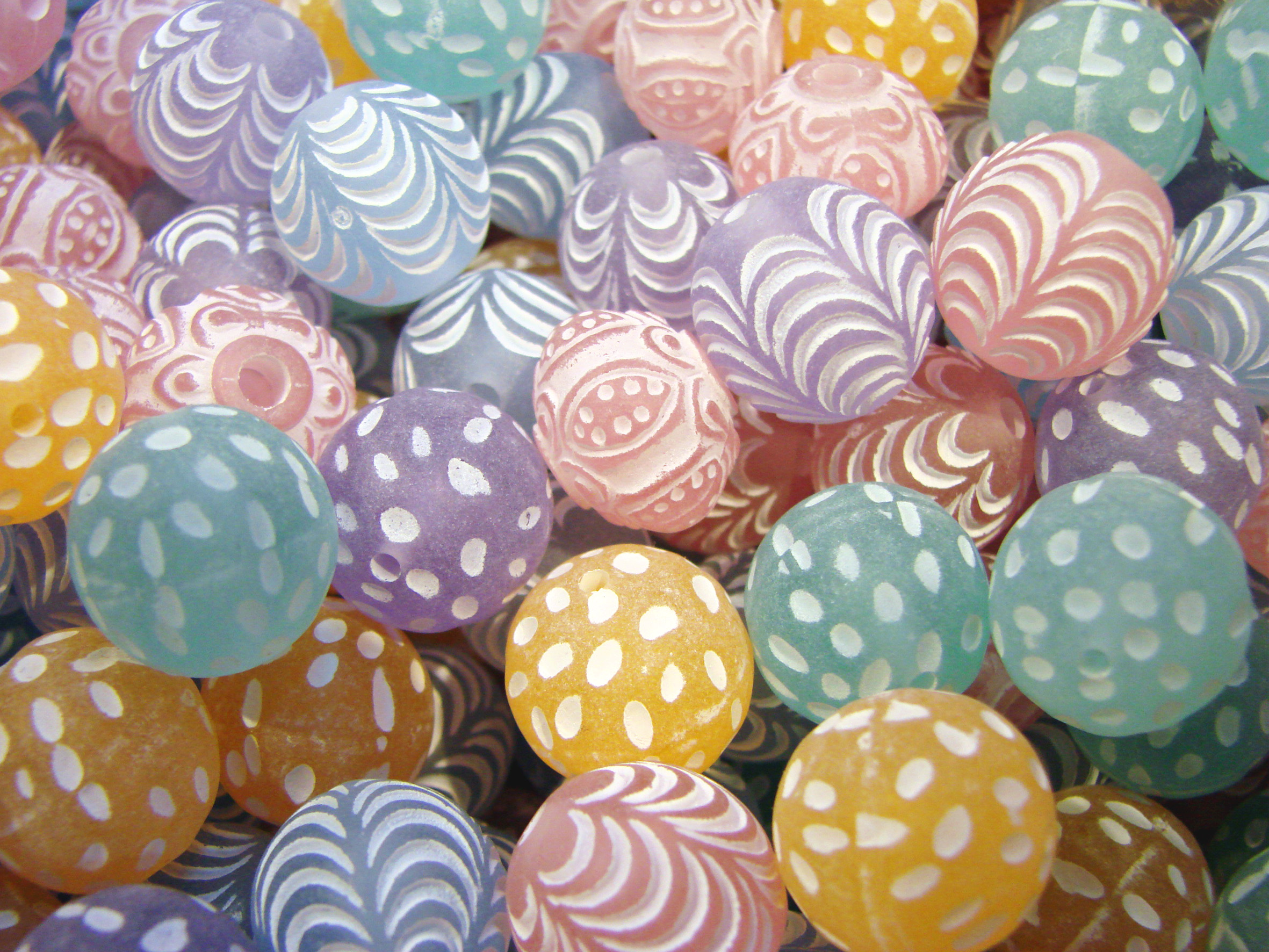
Pastel-colored beads
