= Vincaminol =

Names
- IUPAC name 14α-(Hydroxymethyl)-14,15-dihydro-3α,16α-eburnamenin-14β-ol
- Systematic IUPAC name (4^{1}S,12S,13aS)-13a-Ethyl-12-(hydroxymethyl)-2,3,4^{1},5,6,12,13,13a-octahydro-1H-indolo[3,2,1-de]pyrido[3,2,1-ij][1,5]naphthyridin-12-ol

Identifiers
CAS Number	3382-95-4
3D model (JSmol)	Interactive image
ChemSpider	174193
PubChem CID	201188
UNII	S4D53C4NN7
CompTox Dashboard (EPA)	DTXSID80955408
- InChI: InChI=1S/C20H26N2O2/c1-2-19-9-5-10-21-11-8-15-14-6-3-4-7-16(14)22(17(15)18(19)21)20(24,12-19)13-23/h3-4,6-7,18,23-24H,2,5,8-13H2,1H3/t18-,19+,20+/m1/s1 Key: YCXHPBHFOLIYEB-AABGKKOBSA-N; InChI=1/C20H26N2O2/c1-2-19-9-5-10-21-11-8-15-14-6-3-4-7-16(14)22(17(15)18(19)21)20(24,12-19)13-23/h3-4,6-7,18,23-24H,2,5,8-13H2,1H3/t18-,19+,20+/m1/s1 Key: YCXHPBHFOLIYEB-AABGKKOBBO
- SMILES: CC[C@@]12CCCN3[C@@H]1c4c(c5ccccc5n4[C@](C2)(CO)O)CC3

Properties
Chemical formula	C_{20}H_{26}N_{2}O_{2}
Molar mass	326.440 g·mol^{−1}
- Except where otherwise noted, data are given for materials in their standard state (at 25 °C [77 °F], 100 kPa). Infobox references

Vincaminol (C_{20}H_{26}N_{2}O_{2}) is a chemical that is a part of the Vinca alkaloid group, which were discovered in the 1950s and are derived from Vinca minor (periwinkle). Vincaminol is not as well known as some of the other Vinca alkaloids such as vinblastine, vinorelbine, vincristine, and vindesine, which are the most medically useful Vinca alkaloids.

== Uses ==
Vincaminol is used in to synthesize vincamine.
