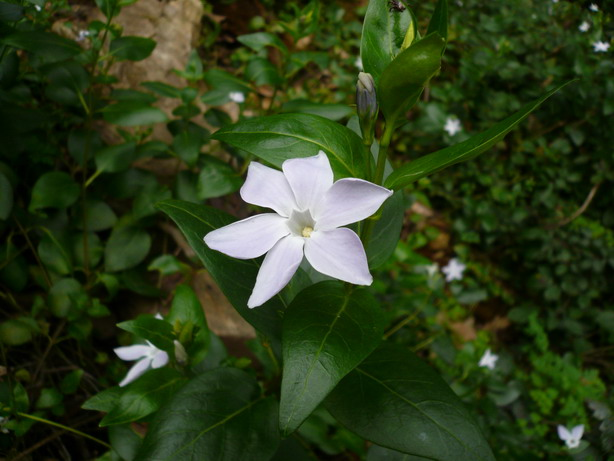

Scientific classification
- Kingdom: Plantae
- Clade: Tracheophytes
- Clade: Angiosperms
- Clade: Eudicots
- Clade: Asterids
- Order: Gentianales
- Family: Apocynaceae
- Genus: Vinca
- Species: V. difformis

Binomial name
- Vinca difformis Pourr.

= Vinca difformis =

Species of shrub

Vinca difformis, commonly called the intermediate periwinkle, is an evergreen, flowering subshrub.

It grows to about 0.5 metres (1 1/2 ft) tall, and forms mats over 1 m (3 1/2 ft) across. Its whitish-blue flowers have a blooming season from late winter to early spring.

It is native to Western Europe, including the Iberian Peninsula, France, the Italian Peninsula and Sardinia.
