= Bis(cyclopentadienyl)titanium(III) chloride =

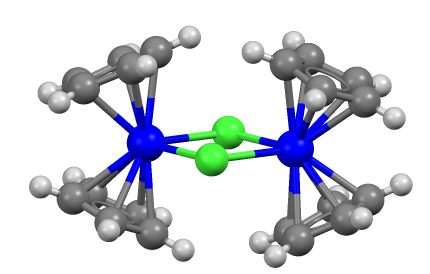

Names
- Other names titanocene monochloride Nugent–RajanBabu reagent

Identifiers
CAS Number	1271-18-7
3D model (JSmol)	monomer: Interactive image; dimer: Interactive image
ChemSpider	57259158
- InChI: InChI=1S/2C5H5.ClH.Ti/c2*1-2-4-5-3-1;;/h2*1-5H;1H;/p-1 Key: GCXNJJRCRJQDSV-UHFFFAOYSA-M
- SMILES: monomer: c1[cH-]ccc1.Cl[Ti+2].c1[cH-]ccc1; dimer: c1[cH-]ccc1.c1[cH-]ccc1.Cl1[Ti+2]Cl[Ti+2]1.c1[cH-]ccc1.c1[cH-]ccc1

Properties
Chemical formula	C_{20}H_{20}Cl_{2}Ti_{2}
Molar mass	427.01 g·mol^{−1}
Appearance	green solid
- Except where otherwise noted, data are given for materials in their standard state (at 25 °C [77 °F], 100 kPa). Infobox references

Bis(cyclopentadienyl)titanium(III) chloride, also known as the Nugent–RajanBabu reagent, is the organotitanium compound which exists as a dimer with the formula [(C_{5}H_{5})_{2}TiCl]_{2}. It is an air sensitive green solid. The complex finds some use in synthetic organic chemistry as a single electron reductant.

In the presence of a suitable solvent that can serve as a two-electron donor ("solv"), such as an ether like tetrahydrofuran, the dimer separates and forms a chemical equilibrium between the forms [(C_{5}H_{5})_{2}TiCl]_{2} and [(C_{5}H_{5})_{2}Ti(solv)Cl]. It is these forms that are responsible for much of the chemical properties of this reagent, which is also the reason that the substance is sometimes written as [(C_{5}H_{5})_{2}TiCl] or [Cp_{2}TiCl], where Cp^{−} represents the cyclopentadienyl anion.

== Synthesis and structure ==
It was first reported in 1955 by Geoffrey Wilkinson It is commonly prepared by reducing titanocene dichloride with zinc, manganese, or magnesium. For use in organic synthesis, the reagent is often prepared and used directly in situ.

The molecule adopts a dimeric structure with bridging chlorides, though in an appropriate solvent such as THF, exists in a chemical equilibrium with monomeric structures:

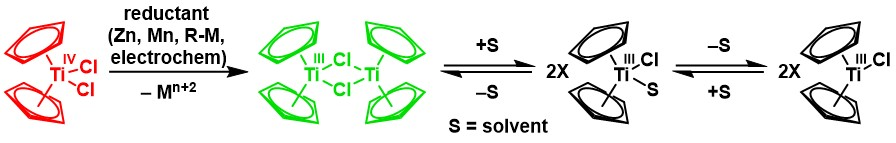
Nugent–RajanBabu reagent synthesis and equilibrium in solution

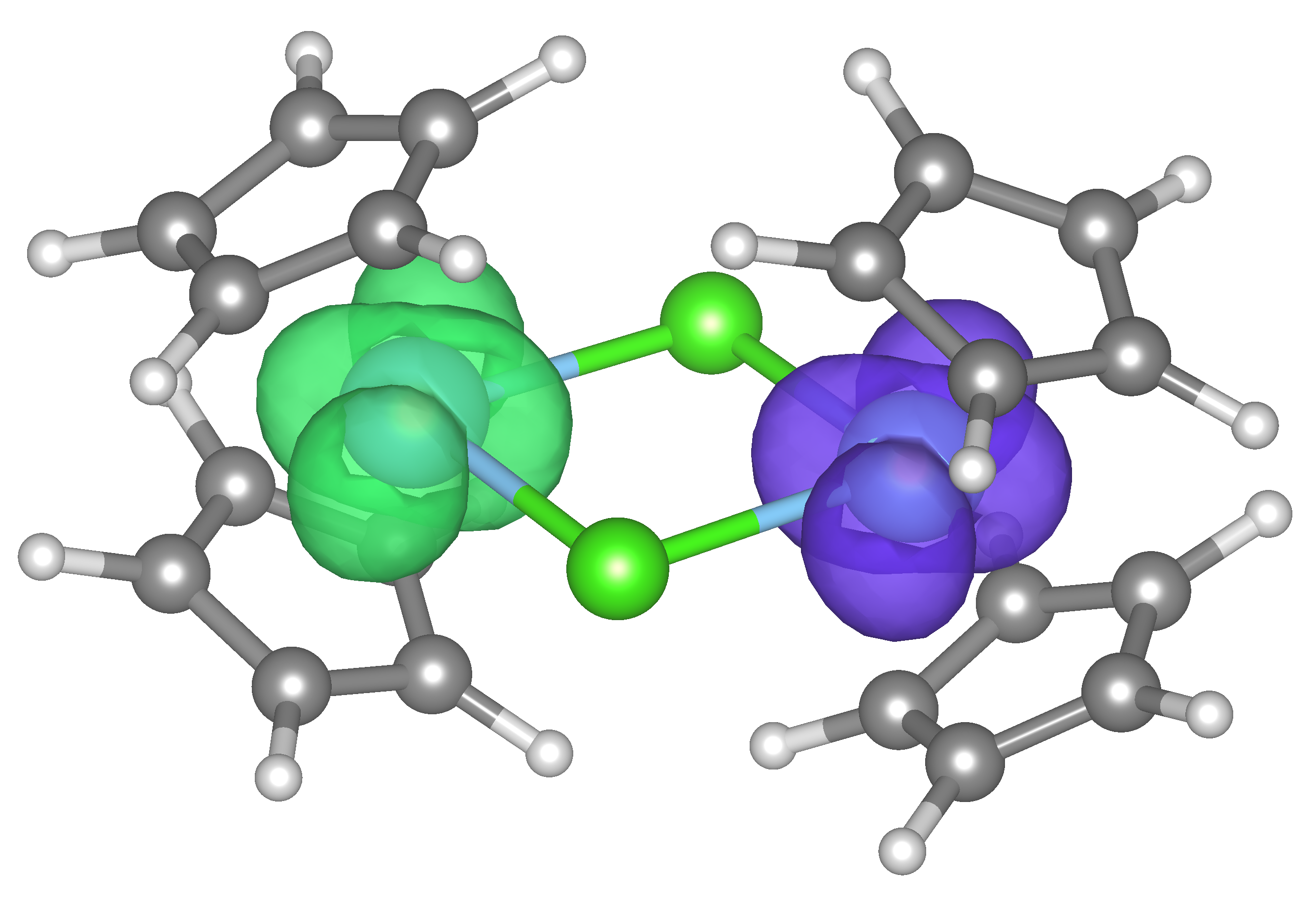
The calculated spin density of the ground state singlet biradical (broken symmetry density functional theory, TPSSh/def2-TZVP).

The molecule has been measured to be an open shell singlet with a J-coupling constant of -138 cm^{−1}.

The compound is also known as the Nugent–RajanBabu reagent, after scientists William A. Nugent and T. V. (Babu) RajanBabu, and has found applications in free radical and organometallic chemistry.

== Use in organic synthesis ==
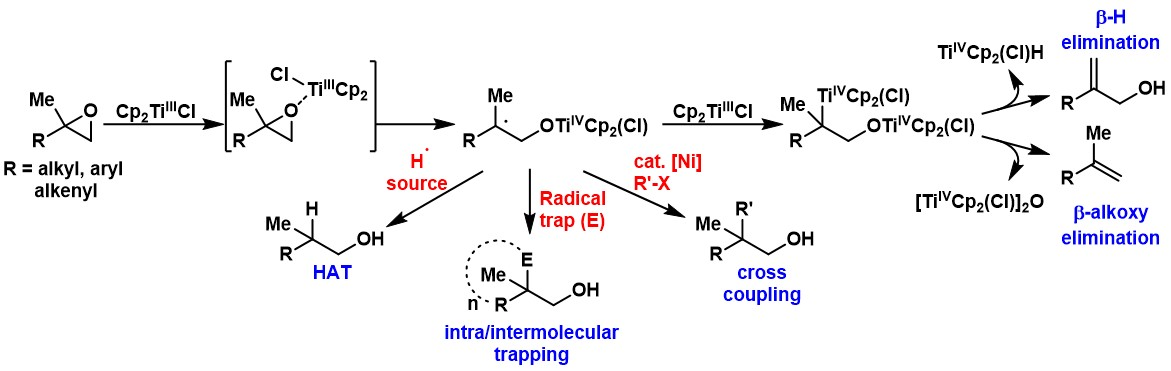

Bis(cyclopentadienyl)titanium(III) chloride effects the anti-Markovnikov opening of epoxides to a free radical intermediate and is tolerant of alcohols and some basic nitrogen functional groups, however it is sensitive to oxidizing functional groups such as nitro groups. As can be seen in the above illustration, subsequent reaction proceeds along a pathway determined by added reagents and reaction conditions:

- In the presence of hydrogen atom donors, such as 1,4-cyclohexadiene, ^{t}BuSH, water, the intermediate is protonated to an alcohol product. This transformation provides the complementary regioisomer to that of an epoxide opening using a metal hydride; in particular, the use of lithium aluminium hydride to form the Markovnikov alcohol and particularly axial cyclohexanols from epoxycyclohexanes is well known.
- Reaction of the intermediate with a second equivalent of Cp_{2}TiCl traps the radical as an alkyl-titanium(IV) species which can either undergo β-hydride elimination (favoured for 3° species) or dehydration via β-alkoxy elimination; in both cases an olefin product is generated.
- The radical intermediate can also be trapped intramolecularly when an appropriate acceptor moiety (such as an alkene, alkyne, carbonyl, etc.) is present in the epoxide. Synthesis of natural products with multiple ring systems have taken advantage of this pathway. Intermolecular trapping of acrylates and acrylonitriles with radicals derived from epoxides is possible, as well as conjunctive intra-intermolecular variants.
- Another pathway intercepts the radical intermediate with nickel catalysis and facilitates enantioselective cross-coupling of opened epoxides with halide and pseudohalide electrophiles.

An example of an application of this reagent is in the preparation of vinorelbine, a chemotherapeutic agent which can be prepared in three steps from the naturally-occurring alkaloid leurosine.

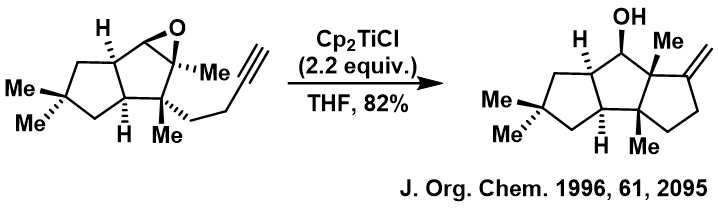

The reagent has been used in the synthesis of over 20 natural products. Ceratopicanol is a naturally occurring sesquiterpene and its carbon skeleton is incorporated with the structures of both anislactone A and merrilactone A. A regioselective epoxide opening and 5-exo dig radical cyclization to forge the core of ceratopicanol. Addition of a hydrochloride salt to the reaction facilitates release of the oxygen-bound titanium(IV) intermediate, allowing the reagent to be recycled.

The Madagascan periwinkle Catharanthus roseus L. is the source for a number of important natural products, including catharanthine and vindoline and the vinca alkaloids it produces from them: leurosine and the chemotherapy agents vinblastine and vincristine, all of which can be obtained from the plant. The newer semi-synthetic chemotherapeutic agent vinorelbine is used in the treatment of non-small-cell lung cancer and is not known to occur naturally. However, it can be prepared either from vindoline and catharanthine or from leurosine, in both cases by synthesis of anhydrovinblastine, which "can be considered as the key intermediate for the synthesis of vinorelbine." The leurosine pathway uses the Nugent–RajanBabu reagent in a highly chemoselective de-oxygenation of leurosine. Anhydrovinblastine is then reacted sequentially with N-bromosuccinimide and trifluoroacetic acid followed by silver tetrafluoroborate to yield vinorelbine.

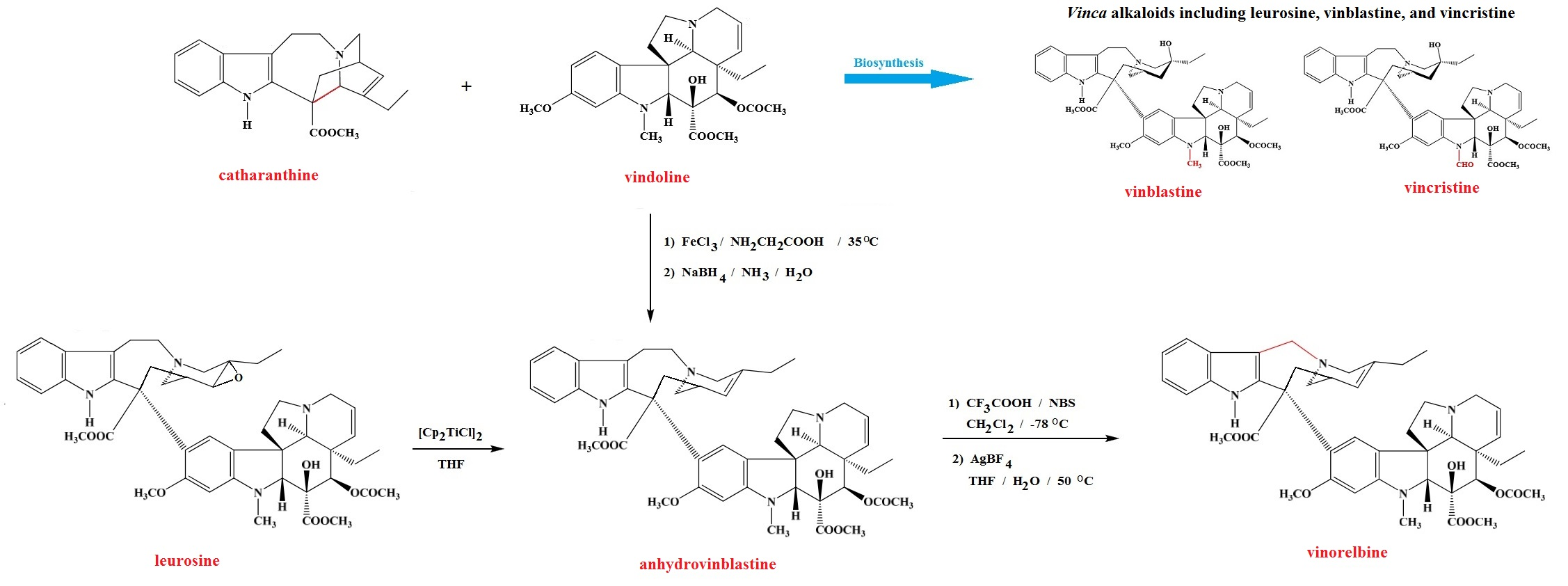

=== Additional reactivity ===
Cyclic and benzylic ketones are reduced to their respective alcohols.

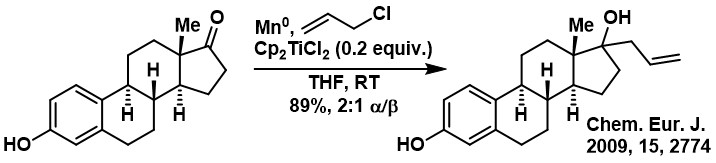
Example of Barbier-type reaction catalysed by Cp_{2}TiCl

Bis(cyclopentadienyl)titanium(III) chloride also effects both Pinacol and McMurry couplings of aldehydes and ketones. Barbier-type reactivity is observed between aldehydes or ketones and allyl electrophiles under catalytic conditions. The proposed mechanism involves titanium(III)-mediated generation of an allyl radical species which intercepts a titanium(III)-coordinated carbonyl. Another application involves the single electron reduction of enones to generate allylic radicals which can undergo intermolecular trapping with acrylonitriles to afford Michael type adducts. Benzylic and allylic alcohols can be de-oxygenated under mild conditions using super-stoichiometric Cp_{2}TiCl, however the reported scope for aliphatic alcohols is currently limited.

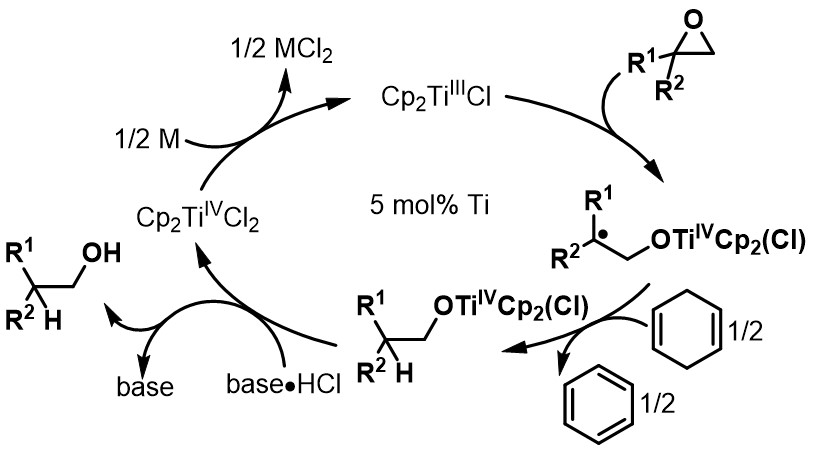
Catalytic modification: addition of a mildly acidic HCl salt promotes cleavage of the Ti^{IV}–O bond and allows regeneration of Cp_{2}Ti^{III}Cl using a stoichiometric reductant

=== Mechanism ===
The dimeric titanium(III) complex reversibly dissociates to the monomer Cp_{2}TiCl. This 15 electron species is Lewis acidic and thus binds epoxides and carbonyl compounds. The complex transfers a single electron to the coordinated substrate generating an alkyl centered radical and an oxygen bound titanium(IV) species. This process is driven by the strength of the titanium-oxygen bond, as well as strain release in the case of epoxides.
