= Vinca ispartensis =

Scientific classification
- Kingdom: Plantae
- Clade: Tracheophytes
- Clade: Angiosperms
- Clade: Eudicots
- Clade: Asterids
- Order: Gentianales
- Family: Apocynaceae
- Genus: Vinca
- Species: V. ispartensis

Binomial name
- Vinca ispartensis Koyuncu & Ekşi

Species of plant

Vinca ispartensis is a species of flowering plant.

== Description ==
Vinca ispartensis is a subshrub (a type of dwarf plant with a woody base) which dies back to its roots in the winter.

== Taxonomy ==
First identified in Isparta Province, Turkey, its discovery was first published in 2015. The specific epithet ispartensis indicates its place of discovery, with its etymology being 'ispart' + 'ensis'; the first half is derived from Isparta, and the latter half is Latin for "originating in".

== Habitat ==
It grows in rocky soil, including that rich in minerals containing calcium carbonate.
