= Periwinkle Run =

Stream in Preble County, Ohio, U.S.

Periwinkle Run is a stream in Preble County, Ohio, in the United States. Periwinkle Run was named for the freshwater snail shells collected there which the early settlers called periwinkles.

== Location ==
- Mouth: Confluence with Sevenmile Creek northwest of Eaton at 39°46′10″N 84°39′20″W
- Source: Preble County at 39°46′18″N 84°44′00″W

== See also ==
- List of rivers of Ohio
