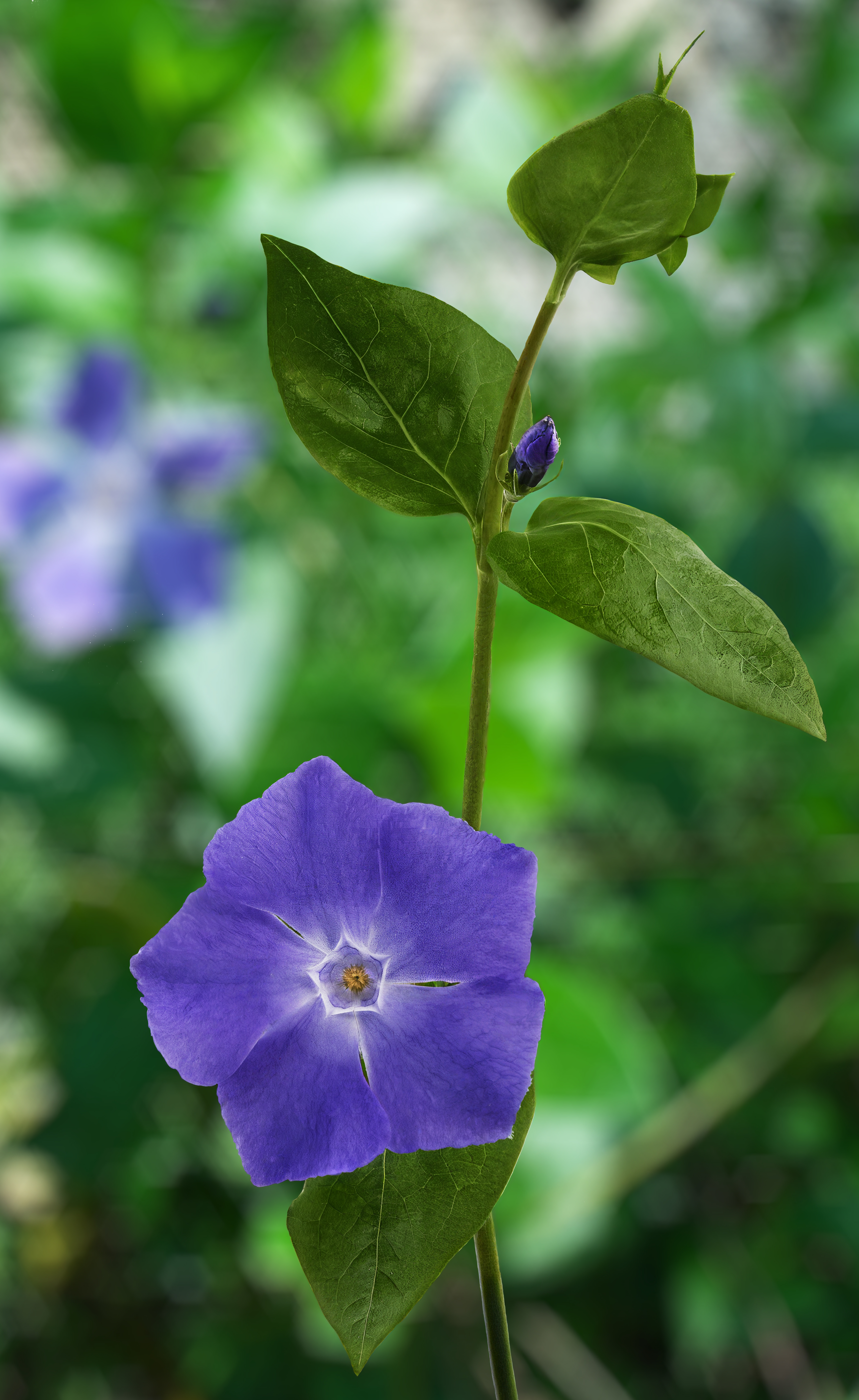

Scientific classification
- Kingdom: Plantae
- Clade: Tracheophytes
- Clade: Angiosperms
- Clade: Eudicots
- Clade: Asterids
- Order: Gentianales
- Family: Apocynaceae
- Genus: Vinca
- Species: V. major

Binomial name
- Vinca major L.

Synonyms
- Vinca major var. variegata Loud.

= Vinca major =

Species of vine

Vinca major, the greater periwinkle, also sometimes called bigleaf periwinkle, large periwinkle or blue periwinkle, is a species of flowering plant in the family Apocynaceae, native to the Mediterranean region. Growing to 25 cm (10 in) tall and spreading indefinitely, it is an evergreen perennial, frequently used in cultivation as a ground cover.

== Description ==
Vinca major is a trailing vine, spreading along the ground and rooting along the stems to form dense masses of ground cover individually 2–5 metres (6 1/2–16 1/2 ft) across and up to 25 centimetres (10 in) high, perhaps even 50–70 cm (20–28 in).

The leaves are opposite, nearly orbicular at the base of the stems and lanceolate at the apex, 3–9 cm (1–3 1/2 in) long and 2–6 cm broad, glossy dark green with a leathery texture and an entire but distinctly ciliate margin, and a hairy petiole 1–2 cm long.

The flowers are hermaphrodite, axillary and solitary, violet-purple, 3–5 cm in diameter, with a five-lobed corolla. The calyx surrounding the base of the flower is 10–17 millimetres (1/2–3/4 in) long with hairy margins. The flowering period extends from early spring to autumn.

=== Similar species ===
The closely related Vinca minor is similar but smaller, with narrower, hairless leaves.

== Taxonomy ==
=== Subspecies ===
Three subspecies are accepted, with geographically separate ranges:

- Vinca major subsp. balcanica (Pénzes) Kozuharov & A.V.Petrova (northern Balkan Peninsula)
- Vinca major subsp. major - leaf petioles finely hairy, hairs short (southern Europe)
- Vinca major subsp. hirsuta (Boiss.) Stearn (syn. V. pubescens d'Urv.) - leaf petioles densely hairy, hairs longer; petals much narrower (Caucasus, northern Turkey)

=== Etymology ===
The genus name probably derives from the Latin word vincire, meaning snip, as the long creeping vines were used to prepare garlands. The Latin specific epithet major means 'larger', relative to the similar V. minor.

== Distribution and habitat ==
This species is found in southern Europe, from Spain and southern France east to the Balkans, and also in northeastern Turkey and the western Caucasus.

It prefers moist undergrowth, woodlands, hedgerows and banks along the rivers at an altitude of 0–800 m (0–2,625 ft) above sea level. It grows well in full sun and in deep shade.

== As an invasive plant ==
Vinca major is an invasive species in temperate parts of the United States, South Africa Australia, and New Zealand. It is especially a common noxious weed 'smothering' native plants and diversity in riparian area and oak woodland habitats of coastal California. It forms dense strands that envelop other plant life and can prevent saplings and shrubs from growing by blocking out the light. Periwinkle moves from place to place, with unintentional human help, in dumped garden waste or as plant fragments carried along in water.

== Cultivation ==
Vinca major is a commonly grown ornamental plant in temperate gardens for its evergreen foliage, spring flowers, and groundcover or vine use.

Many cultivars are available, with differences in flowers, such as white to dark violet flowers, and different patterns and colours of variegated foliage. The cultivar 'Variegata' has gained the Royal Horticultural Society's Award of Garden Merit.

It contains the following compounds: vinblastine, vincristine, vindesine and vinorelbine.

== Gallery ==
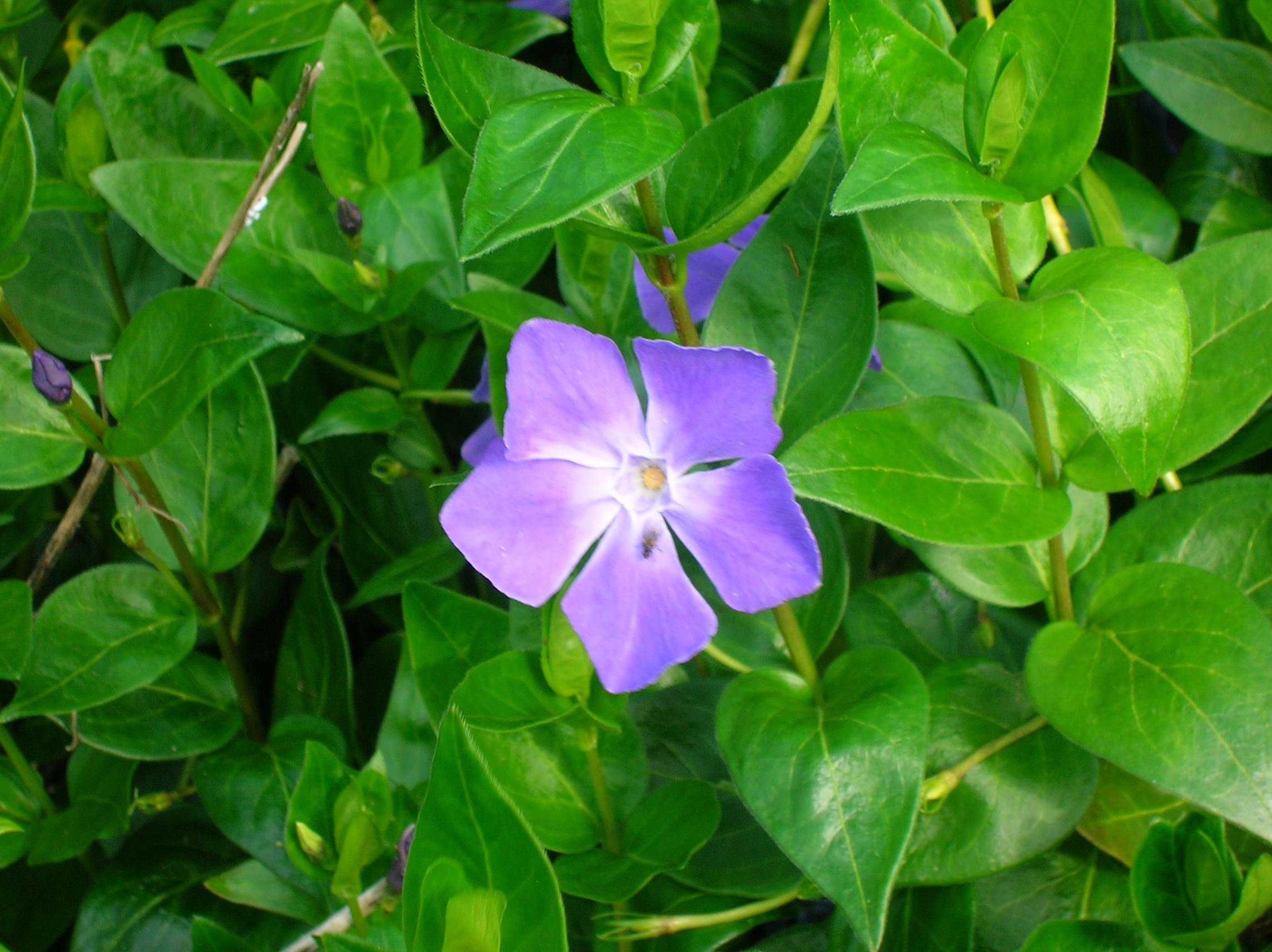
Detail of the flower, swelling flower buds and foliage in spring

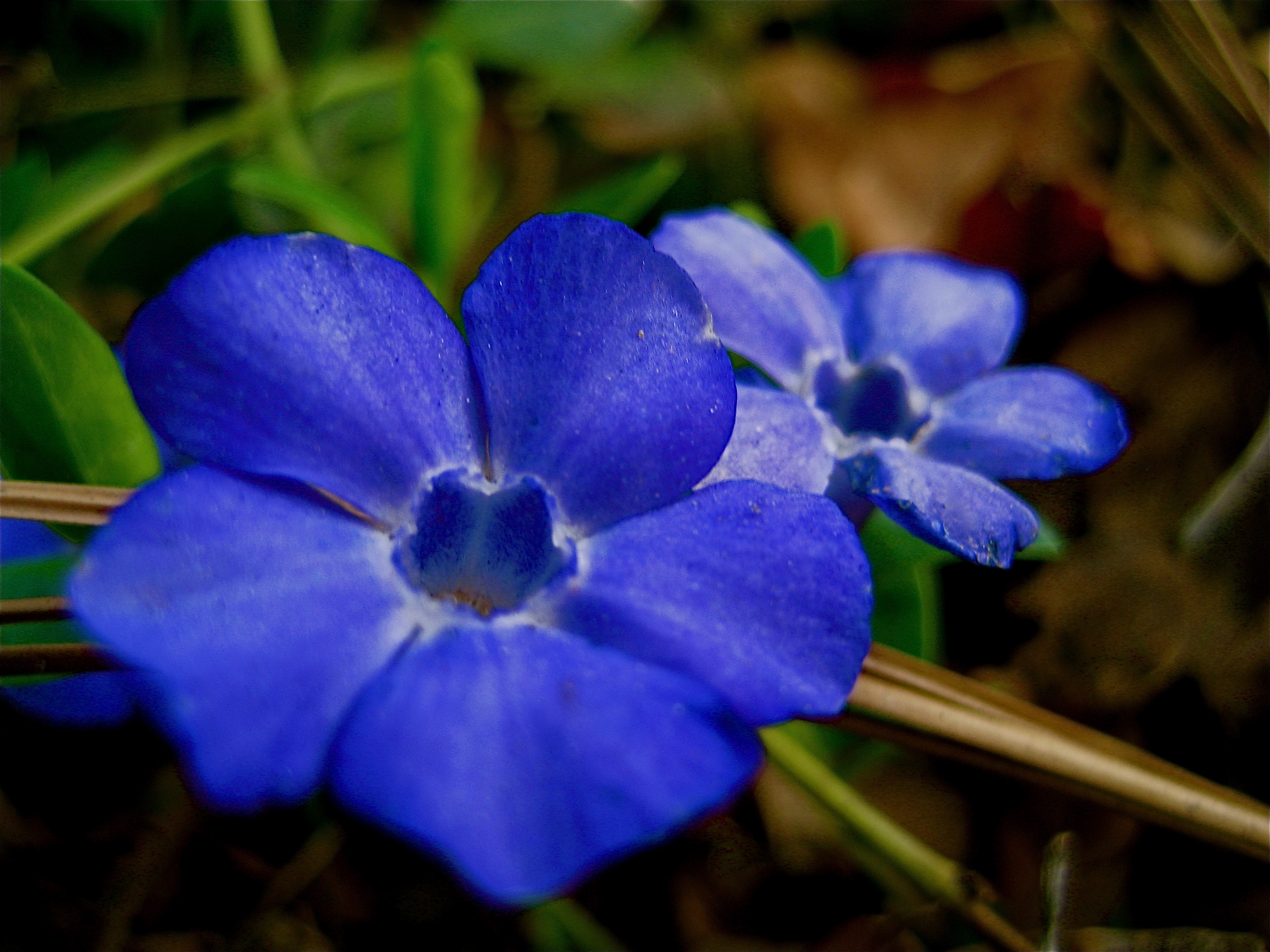
Giant steps periwinkle, a variety of Vinca major

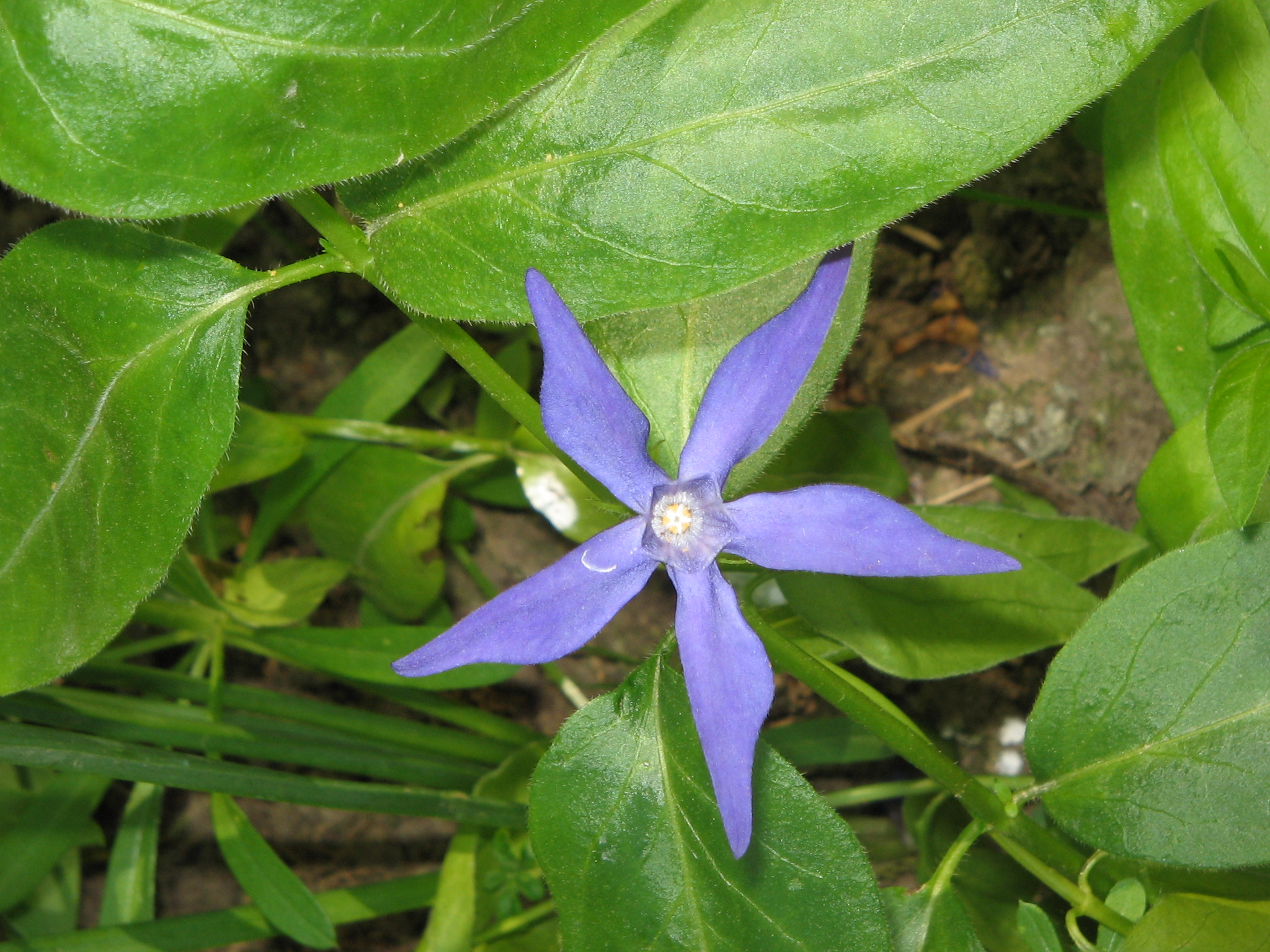
A display of the flower of var. oxyloba

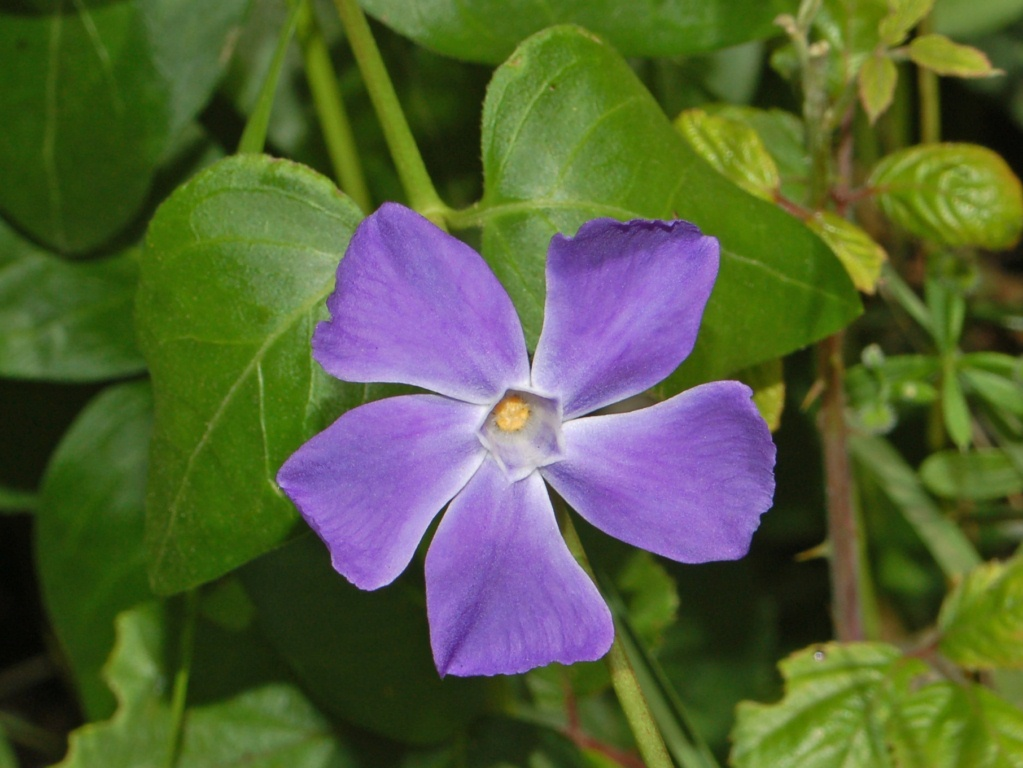

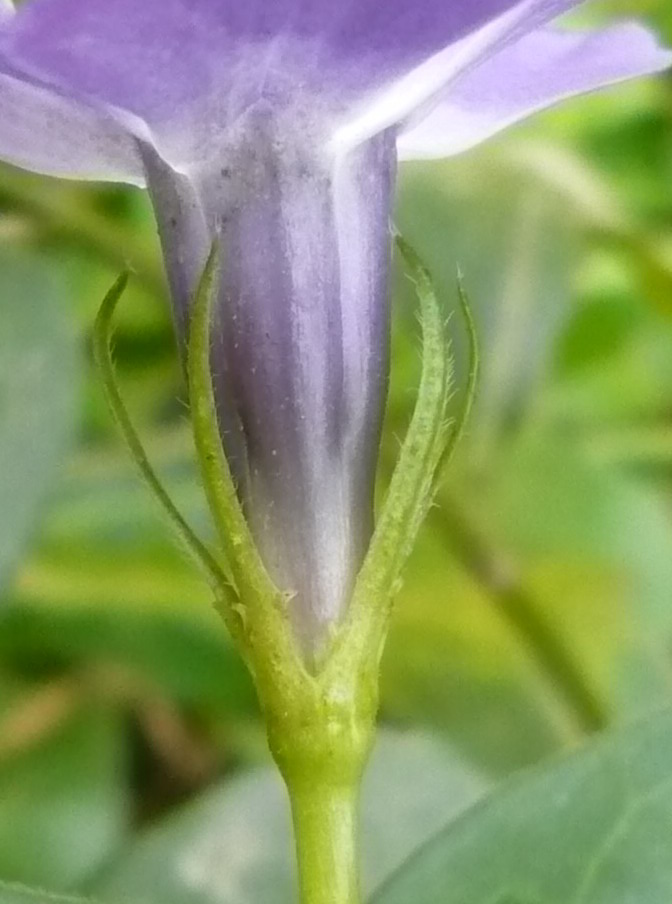
Note hairy margin of sepals

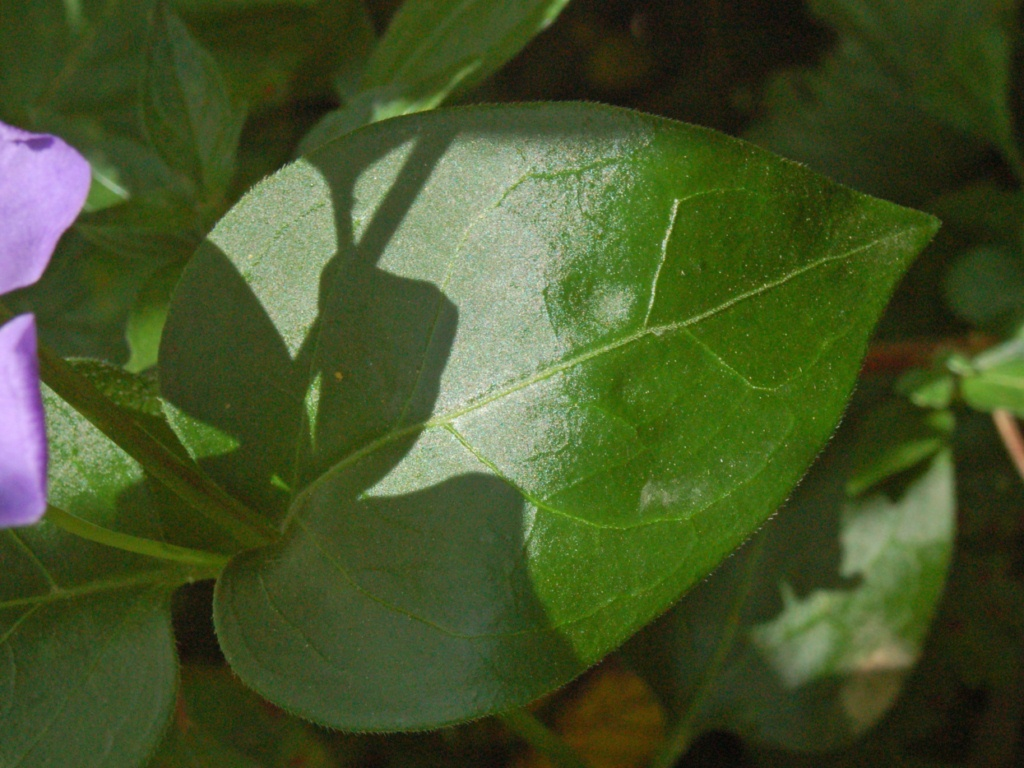

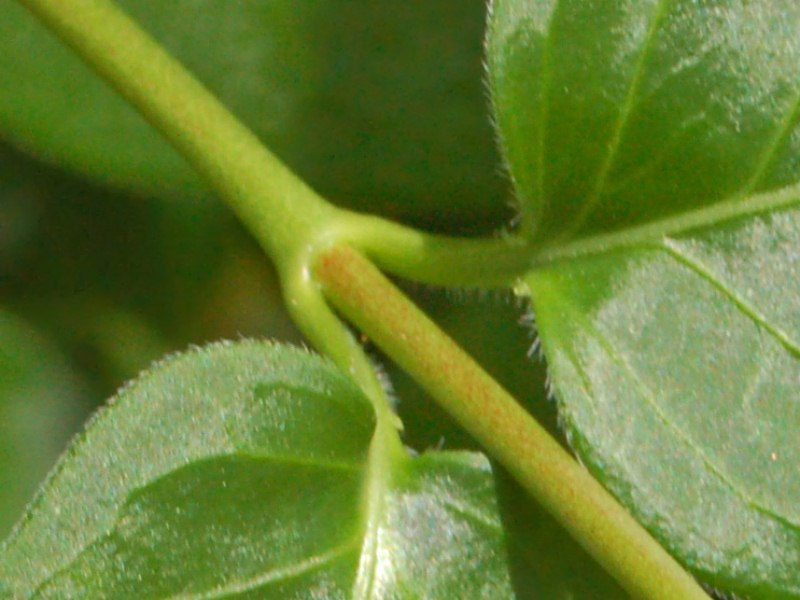
Leaves with ciliate margins and a hairy petiole

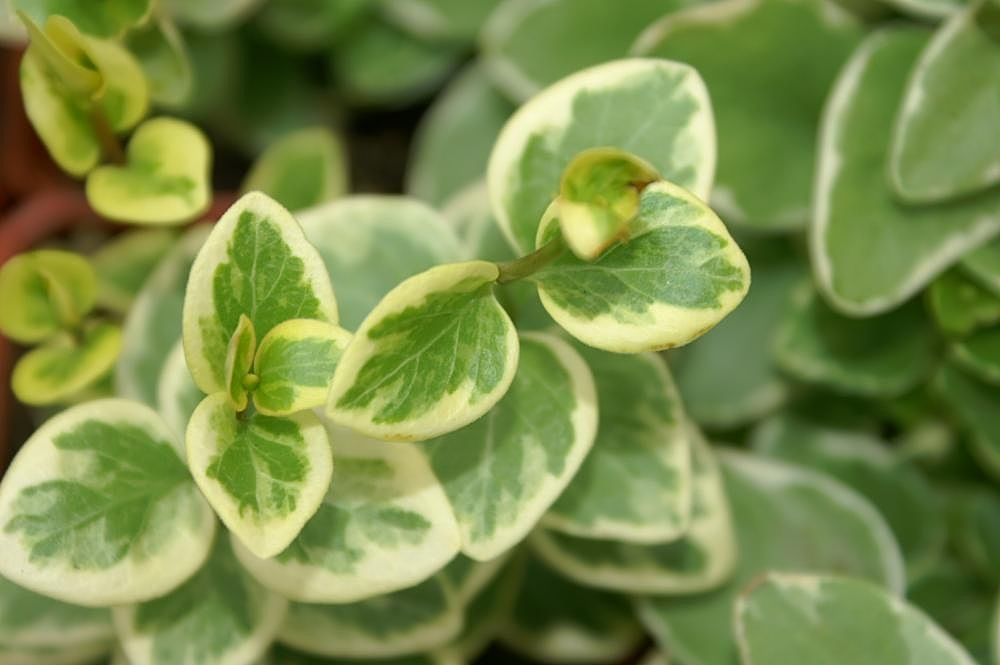
'Variegata'
