= FV-100 =

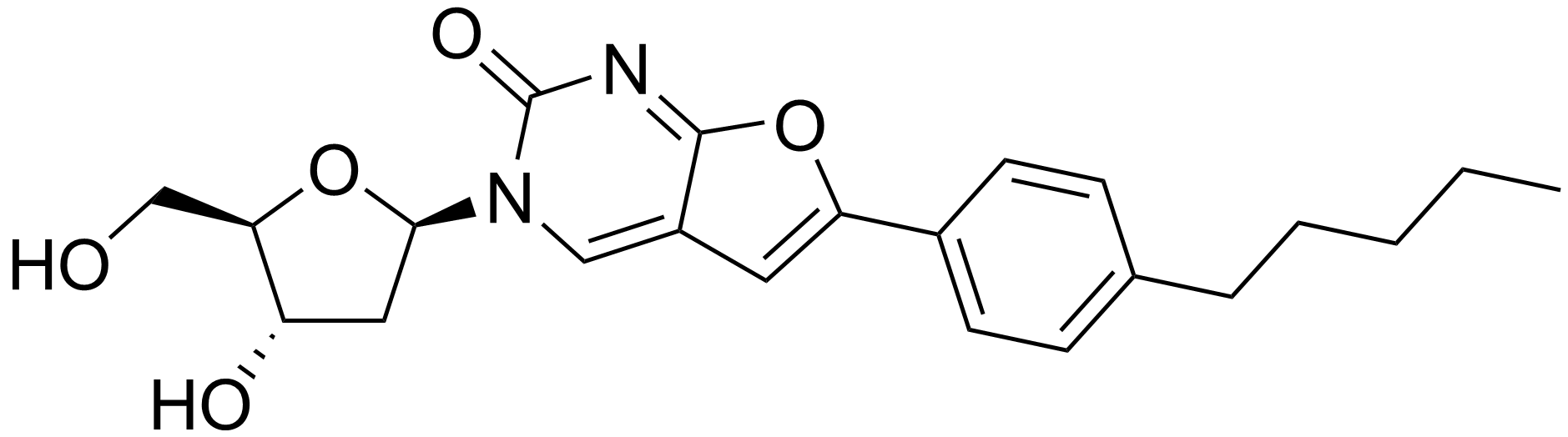

Names
- IUPAC name 3-(2-Deoxy-β-D-erythro-pentofuranosyl)-6-(4-pentylphenyl)furo[2,3-d]pyrimidin-2(3H)-one
- Systematic IUPAC name 3-[(2R,4S,5R)-4-Hydroxy-5-(hydroxymethyl)oxolan-2-yl]-6-(4-pentylphenyl)furo[2,3-d]pyrimidin-2(3H)-one
- Other names Cf1743

Identifiers
CAS Number	956483-02-6
3D model (JSmol)	Interactive image
ChEMBL	ChEMBL344738
ChemSpider	431897
PubChem CID	493485
UNII	0NJ5F6D4U7
CompTox Dashboard (EPA)	DTXSID60185781
- InChI: InChI=1S/C22H26N2O5/c1-2-3-4-5-14-6-8-15(9-7-14)18-10-16-12-24(22(27)23-21(16)29-18)20-11-17(26)19(13-25)28-20/h6-10,12,17,19-20,25-26H,2-5,11,13H2,1H3/t17-,19+,20+/m0/s1 Key: MFGSDSRTGUVZQG-DFQSSKMNSA-N
- SMILES: CCCCCC1=CC=C(C=C1)C2=CC3=CN(C(=O)N=C3O2)[C@H]4C[C@@H]([C@H](O4)CO)O

Properties
Chemical formula	C_{22}H_{26}N_{2}O_{5}
Molar mass	398.459 g·mol^{−1}
- Except where otherwise noted, data are given for materials in their standard state (at 25 °C [77 °F], 100 kPa). verify (what is ?) Infobox references

FV-100, also known as Cf1743, is an orally available nucleoside analogue drug with antiviral activity. It may be effective against shingles.

It was discovered in 1999 in the laboratories of Prof Chris McGuigan, Welsh School of Pharmacy and Prof. Jan Balzarini, Rega Institute, Leuven, Belgium.

== Clinical trials ==
FV-100 was tested against valaciclovir in a phase II trial in patients with herpes zoster. The trial was sponsored by Bristol-Myers Squibb. The drug is currently being developed by ContraVir Pharmaceuticals, Inc., Edison, New Jersey. It has reached Phase III clinical trials.
