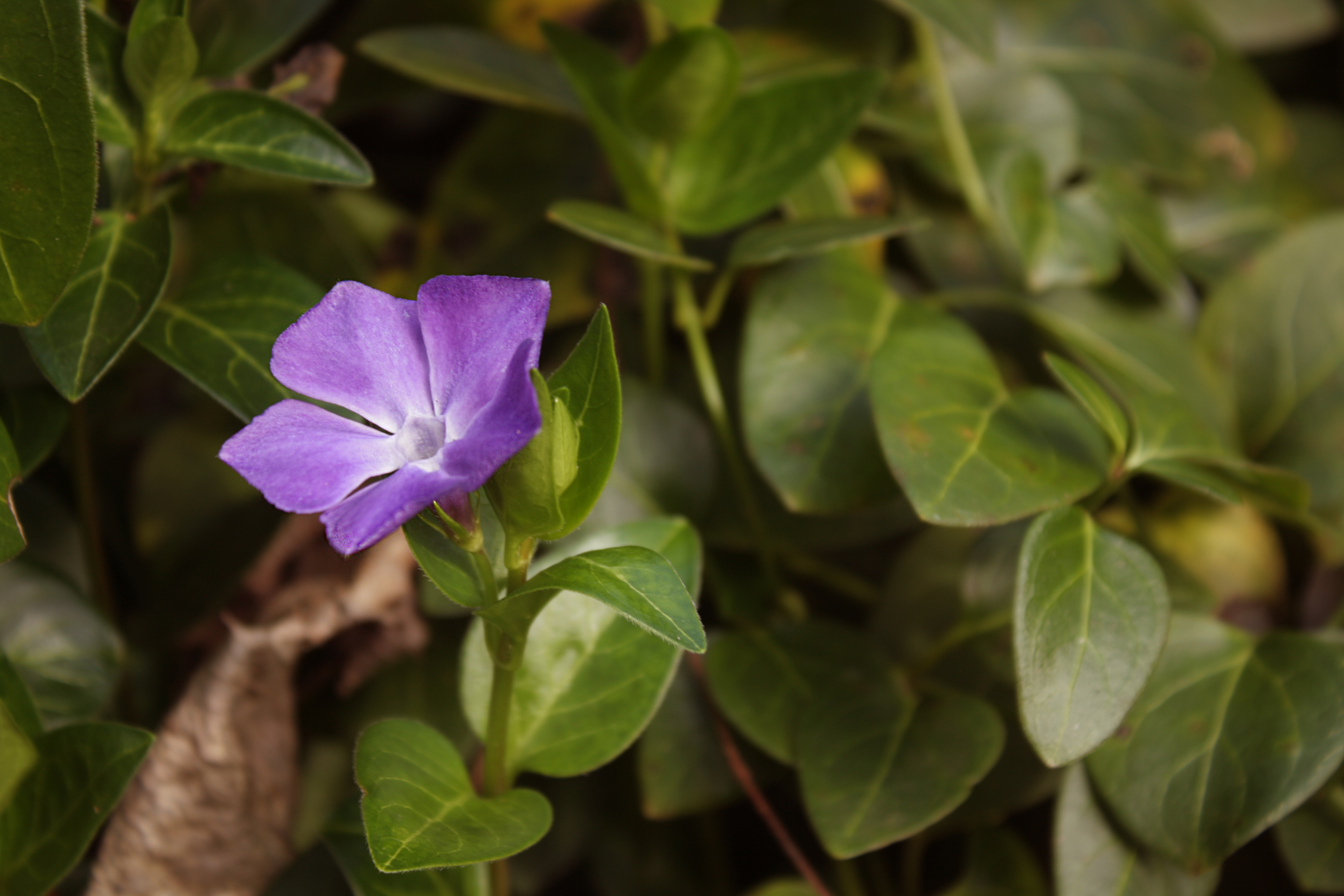
- Vinca major

Scientific classification
- Kingdom: Plantae
- Clade: Embryophytes
- Clade: Tracheophytes
- Clade: Angiosperms
- Clade: Eudicots
- Clade: Asterids
- Order: Gentianales
- Family: Apocynaceae
- Subfamily: Rauvolfioideae
- Tribe: Vinceae
- Subtribe: Vincinae; M.E.Endress
- Genus: Vinca; L. 1753

Synonyms
- Pervinca Mill.

= Vinca =

Genus of flowering plants

Vinca (/ˈvɪŋkə/; from Latin vincire "to bind, fetter") is an Old World genus of flowering plants in the family Apocynaceae. The English name periwinkle is shared with the related genus Catharanthus (and with the mollusc Littorina littorea). Some Vinca species are cultivated but have also spread invasively. Additionally, some species have medicinal uses. The most widespread species is Vinca minor.

== Description ==
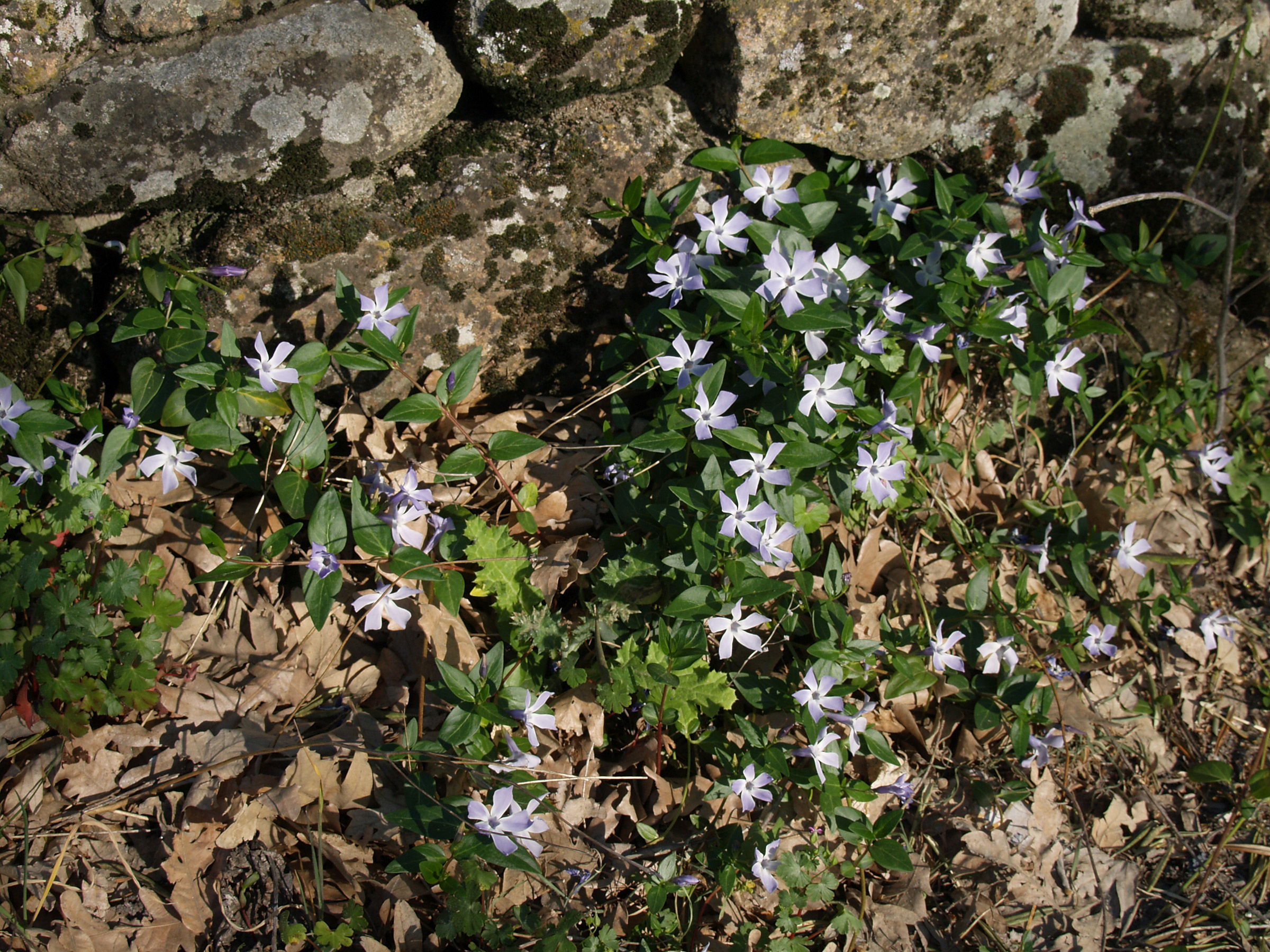
Vinca difformis in habitat, Cáceres, Spain

Vinca plants are subshrubs or herbaceous, and have slender trailing stems 1–2 m (3 1/2–6 1/2 ft) long but not growing more than 20–70 cm (8–27 1/2 in) above ground; the stems frequently take root where they touch the ground, enabling the plant to spread widely. The leaves are opposite, simple broad lanceolate to ovate, 1–9 cm (1/2–3 1/2 in) long and 0.5–6 cm (1/4–2 1/4 in) broad; they are evergreen in four species, but deciduous in the herbaceous V. herbacea, which dies back to the root system in winter.

The flowers, produced through most of the growing season, are salverform (like those of Phlox), simple, 2.5–7 cm (1–3 in) broad, with five usually violet (occasionally white) petals joined together at the base to form a tube. The fruit consists of a pair of divergent follicles; the dry fruit dehisces along one rupture site to release seeds.

== Species ==
Seven species are accepted:

- Vinca difformis Pourr. – Azores, western and central Mediterranean
- Vinca erecta Regel & Schmalh. – Afghanistan, Kyrgyzstan, Tajikistan, Uzbekistan
- Vinca herbacea Waldst. & Kit. – central, eastern and southeastern Europe; Middle East
- Vinca ispartensis Koyuncu & Ekşi – Turkey
- Vinca major L. – southern Europe, Turkey, Syria, Caucasus; introduced to and established in New Zealand, California, British Isles, central Europe, Poland, Ukraine, North Africa, south China, Canary Islands, Madeira, North America, Mexico, Colombia, Venezuela, Peru, Costa Rica, Guatemala
- Vinca minor L. – central and southeastern Europe, Poland, Ukraine, Caucasus; introduced to and established in British Isles, Scandinavia, Portugal, Turkey, south China, North America, New Zealand
- Vinca soneri Koyuncu – eastern Anatolia, Turkey

== Distribution and habitat ==
The genus is native to Europe, northwest Africa and southwest Asia.

== Ecology ==
Vinca major and Vinca minor may be invasive in some regions where they are introduced species because the rapid spreading chokes out native plant species and alters habitats. Areas affected include parts of Australia, New Zealand, Canada, and the United States, especially coastal California.

== Cultivation ==
Vinca major and V. minor are extensively cultivated as flowering evergreen ornamental plants. Because the plants are low and spread quickly, they are often used as ground cover in garden landscapes and container gardens. They are also traditionally used in older cemeteries as an evergreen maintenance-free ground cover. Many cultivars are available, with different plant, leaf, and flower colours, sizes, and habits.

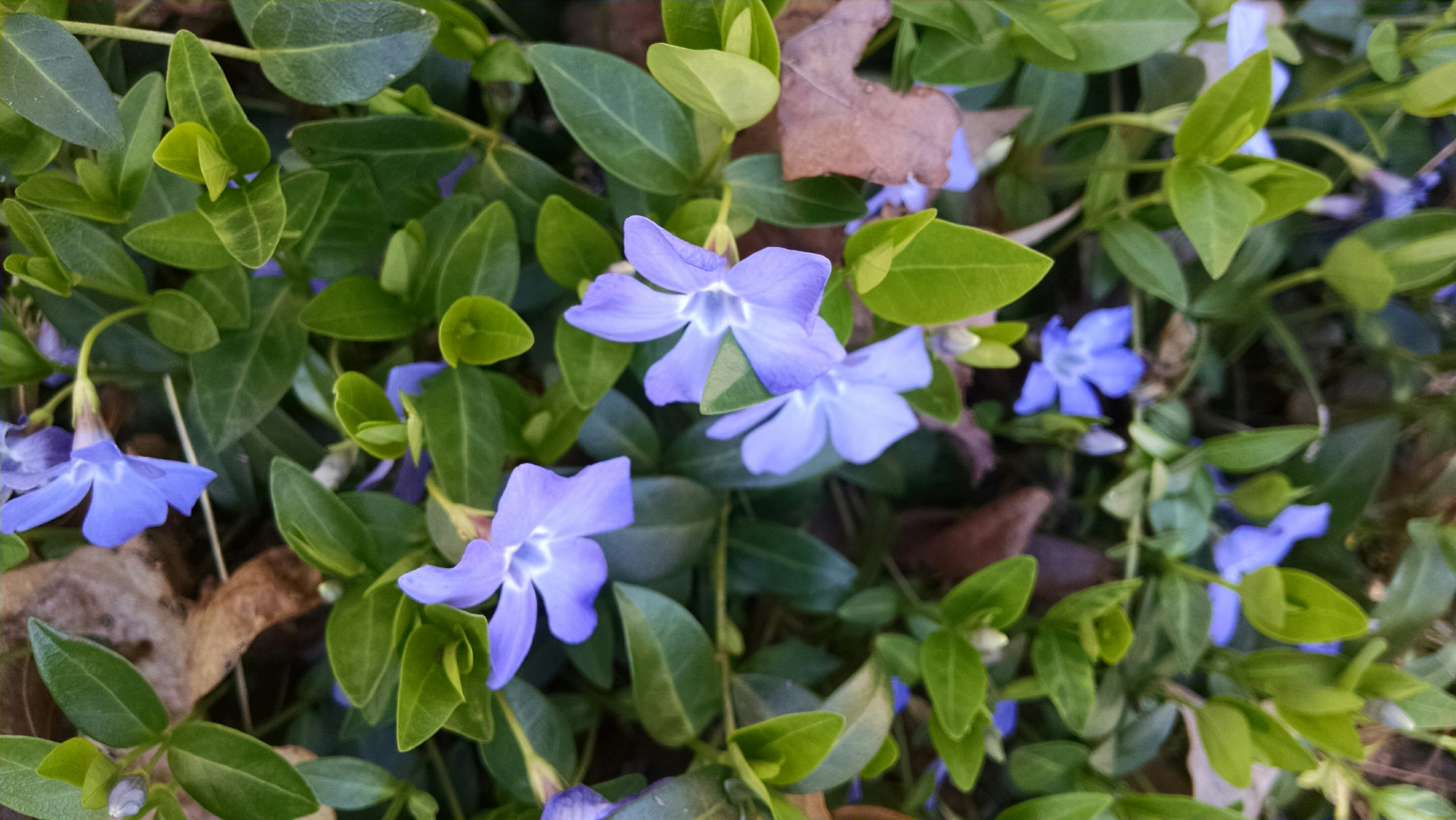
Vinca plants spreading along a border

== Medicinal uses ==
The vinca alkaloids include at least 86 alkaloids extracted from plants in the genus Vinca. The chemotherapy agent vincristine is extracted from a closely related species, Catharanthus roseus, and is used to treat some leukemias, lymphomas, and childhood cancers, as well as several other types of cancer and some non-cancerous conditions. Vinblastine is a chemical analogue of vincristine and is also used to treat various forms of cancer. Dimeric alkaloids such as vincristine and vinblastine are produced by the coupling the smaller indole alkaloids vindoline and catharanthine. In addition, the nootropic agent vincamine is derived from V. minor. Vinorelbine, a newer semi-synthetic chemotherapeutic agent, is used in the treatment of non-small-cell lung cancer and is prepared either from the natural products leurosine or catharanthine and vindoline, in both cases by first preparing anhydrovinblastine.
