= Periwinkle (color) =

Color in the violet and blue family

Common connotations
- serenity, peacefulness, femininity and comfort

Color coordinates
- Hex triplet: #CCCCFF
- sRGB^{B} (r, g, b): (204, 204, 255)
- HSV (h, s, v): (240°, 20%, 100%)
- CIELCh_{uv} (L, C, h): (84, 42, 266°)
- Source: Maerz and Paul
- ISCC–NBS descriptor: Very light purplish blue
- B: Normalized to [0–255] (byte)

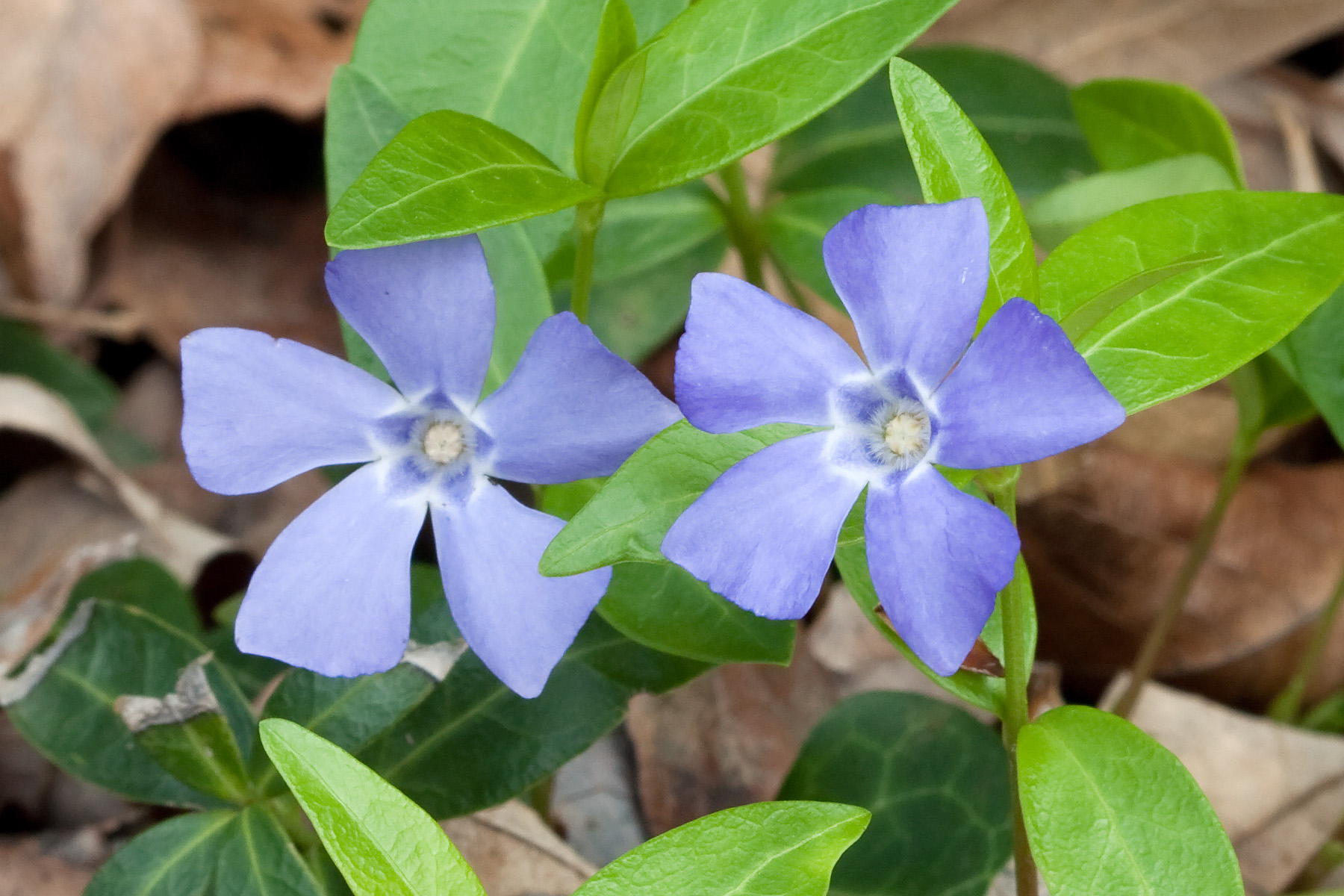
A periwinkle flower.

Periwinkle is a color in the blue and violet family. Its name is derived from the lesser periwinkle or myrtle herb (Vinca minor) which bears flowers of the same color.

The color periwinkle is also called lavender blue and light blue violet. The color periwinkle may be considered a pale tint of purple-blue in the Munsell color system, or a "pastel purple-blue". The color can represent serenity, calmness, winter, and ice. It can also symbolize blossoming friendships, womanhood, sentimental memories, and everlasting love.

The first recorded use of periwinkle as a color name in English was in 1922.

== In popular culture ==
- Periwinkle blue is the color for esophageal and stomach cancer awareness ribbons, and for anorexia nervosa and bulimia. It is also the color for pulmonary hypertension awareness ribbons.
- Periwinkle was added to the Crayola palette in 1949.
- In the late 1990s, the Anaheim Angels changed their uniform to include this color.
