= Vineridine =

Names
- IUPAC name Methyl (3S)-11-methoxy-19α-methyl-2-oxo-3β,20α-formosanan-16-carboxylate
- Systematic IUPAC name Methyl (1′S,3S,4′aS,5′aR,10′aS)-6-methoxy-1′-methyl-2-oxo-1,2,4′a,5′,5′a,7′,8′,10′a-octahydro-1′H,10′H-spiro[indole-3,6′-pyrano[3,4-f]indolizine]-4′-carboxylate
- Other names Isocaboxine A

Identifiers
| CAS Number | 3489-06-3 |
| 3D model (JSmol) | Interactive image |
| ChemSpider | 172167 |
| PubChem CID | 198910 |
| UNII | RAK4CV25QT |
| CompTox Dashboard (EPA) | DTXSID90956365 |
- InChI: InChI=1S/C22H26N2O5/c1-12-15-10-24-7-6-22(17-5-4-13(27-2)8-18(17)23-21(22)26)19(24)9-14(15)16(11-29-12)20(25)28-3/h4-5,8,11-12,14-15,19H,6-7,9-10H2,1-3H3,(H,23,26)/t12-,14-,15-,19+,22-/m0/s1 Key: SRKHGHLMEDVZRX-PNGOUSOWSA-N
- SMILES: C[C@H]1[C@@H]2CN3CC[C@@]4([C@H]3C[C@@H]2C(=CO1)C(=O)OC)c5ccc(cc5NC4=O)OC

Properties
| Chemical formula | C_{22}H_{26}N_{2}O_{5} |
| Molar mass | 398.45 |
- Except where otherwise noted, data are given for materials in their standard state (at 25 °C [77 °F], 100 kPa). Infobox references

Vineridine (vineridin) is a vinca alkaloid.
