= Vinca herbacea =

- Vinca herbacea leaves and flowers

Scientific classification
- Kingdom: Plantae
- Clade: Tracheophytes
- Clade: Angiosperms
- Clade: Eudicots
- Clade: Asterids
- Order: Gentianales
- Family: Apocynaceae
- Genus: Vinca
- Species: V. herbacea

Binomial name
- Vinca herbacea Waldst. & Kit.

Synonyms
- Vinca libanotica Zucc.; Vinca mixta Velen.; Vinca pumila E.D.Clarke

Species of plant

Vinca herbacea, with common name herbaceous periwinkle, is a flowering plant native to eastern Europe.

== Description ==
Vinca herbacea is a herbaceous perennial growing as a trailing vine, spreading along the ground and rooting along the stems to form clonal colonies, growing up to 10–20 centimetres (4–8 in) high.

The leaves are opposite, lanceolate, 1–5 cm (1/2–2 in) long and 0.2–3 cm (1/8–1 1/8 in) broad, glossy green with an entire margin, and nearly sessile with only a very short petiole.

The flowers are produced in late summer, blue-violet or occasionally white, 2.5–3.5 cm (1–1 1/2 in) diameter, with a five-lobed corolla.

== Distribution and habitat ==
The plant is native to eastern and southeastern Europe, from Austria south to Greece, and east to the Crimea, and also in northern Western Asia, in the Caucasus and Alborz mountains, mainly in steppe habitats.

== Cultivation ==
Vinca herbacea is occasionally grown as an ornamental plant in temperate climate gardens, as a rock garden plant.
