= Vinca alkaloid =

Alkaloid agents from the Cape periwinkle

Chemical structure of the vinca alkaloid vincristine

Vinca alkaloids are a set of anti-mitotic and anti-microtubule alkaloid agents originally derived from the periwinkle plant Catharanthus roseus (basionym Vinca rosea) and other vinca plants. They block beta-tubulin polymerization in a dividing cell.

== Sources ==
The Madagascan periwinkle Catharanthus roseus L. is the source for a number of important natural products, including catharanthine and vindoline and the vinca alkaloids it produces from them: leurosine and the chemotherapy agents vinblastine and vincristine, all of which can be obtained from the plant. The newer semi-synthetic chemotherapeutic agent vinorelbine is used in the treatment of non-small-cell lung cancer and is not known to occur naturally. However, it can be prepared either from vindoline and catharanthine or from leurosine, in both cases by synthesis of anhydrovinblastine, which "can be considered as the key intermediate for the synthesis of vinorelbine." The leurosine pathway uses the Nugent–RajanBabu reagent in a highly chemoselective de-oxygenation of leurosine. Anhydrovinblastine is then reacted sequentially with N-bromosuccinimide and trifluoroacetic acid followed by silver tetrafluoroborate to yield vinorelbine.

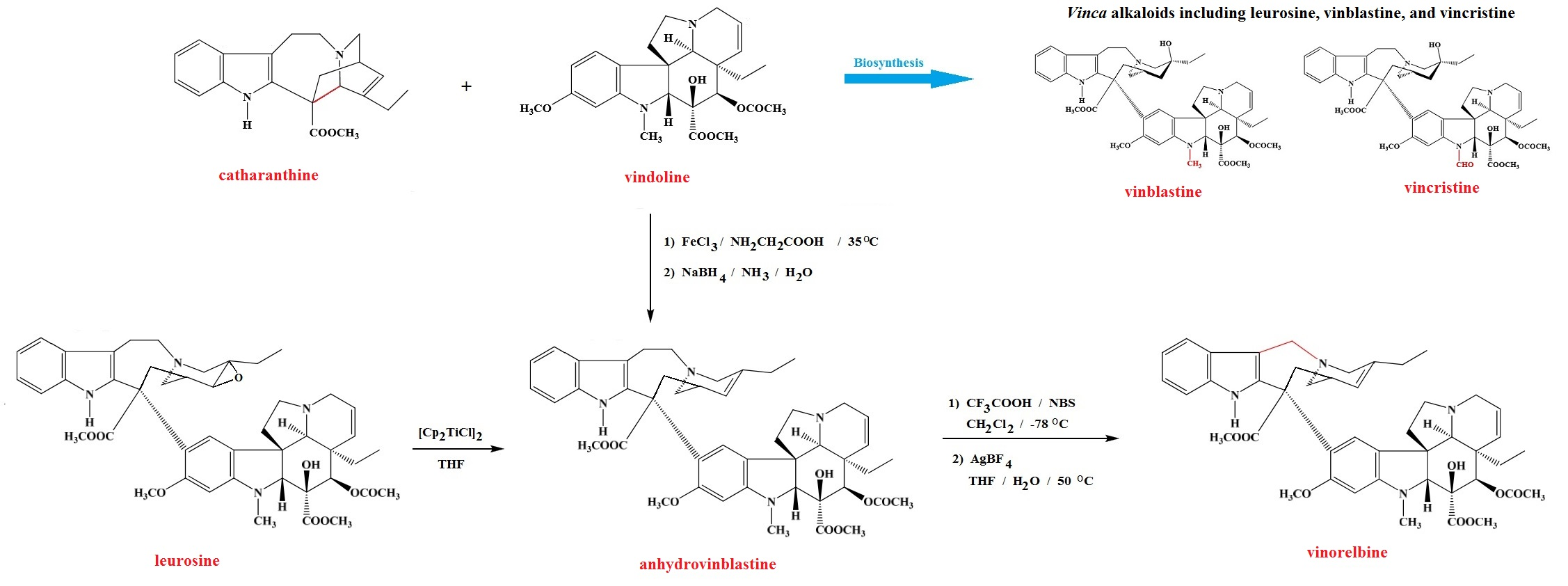

== Applications ==
Vinca alkaloids are used in chemotherapy for cancer. They are a class of cell cycle–specific cytotoxic drugs that work by inhibiting the ability of cancer cells to divide: Acting upon tubulin, they prevent it from forming into microtubules, a necessary component for cellular division. The vinca alkaloids thus prevent microtubule polymerization, as opposed to the mechanism of action of taxanes.

Vinca alkaloids are now produced synthetically and used as drugs in cancer therapy and as immunosuppressive drugs. These compounds include vinblastine, vincristine, vindesine, and vinorelbine. Additional researched vinca alkaloids include vincaminol, vineridine, and vinburnine.

Vinpocetine is a semi-synthetic derivative of vincamine (sometimes described as "a synthetic ethyl ester of apovincamine").

Minor vinca alkaloids include minovincine, methoxyminovincine, minovincinine, vincadifformine, desoxyvincaminol, and vincamajine.
