= Vindesine =

Chemical compound

Clinical data
- AHFS/Drugs.com: Micromedex Detailed Consumer Information
- Pregnancy category: AU: D
- Routes of administration: Intravenous
- ATC code: L01CA03 (WHO)

Legal status
- Legal status: In general: ℞ (Prescription only)

Pharmacokinetic data
- Protein binding: 65-75%
- Metabolism: Hepatic (CYP3A4-mediated)
- Elimination half-life: 24 hours
- Excretion: Biliary and renal

Identifiers
- IUPAC name: methyl (5S,7S,9S)- 9-[(2β,3β,4β,5α,12β,19α)- 3-(aminocarbonyl)- 3,4-dihydroxy- 16-methoxy- 1-methyl- 6,7-didehydroaspidospermidin- 15-yl]- 5-ethyl- 5-hydroxy- 1,4,5,6,7,8,9,10-octahydro- 2H- 3,7-methanoazacycloundecino[5,4-b]indole- 9-carboxylate
- CAS Number: 53643-48-4; Sulfate: 59917-39-4
- PubChem CID: 40839
- DrugBank: DB00309
- ChemSpider: 37302
- UNII: RSA8KO39WH; Sulfate: CPH2U7DNDY
- KEGG: D01769
- ChEBI: CHEBI:36373
- ChEMBL: ChEMBL219146
- CompTox Dashboard (EPA): DTXSID6023739
- ECHA InfoCard: 100.053.330

Chemical and physical data
- Formula: C_{43}H_{55}N_{5}O_{7}
- Molar mass: 753.941 g·mol^{−1}
- 3D model (JSmol): Interactive image
- SMILES: O=C(OC)[C@]4(c2c(c1ccccc1[nH]2)CCN3C[C@](O)(CC)C[C@@H](C3)C4)c5c(OC)cc6c(c5)[C@@]89[C@@H](N6C)[C@@](O)(C(=O)N)[C@H](O)[C@@]7(/C=C\CN([C@@H]78)CC9)CC
- InChI: InChI=1S/C43H55N5O7/c1-6-39(52)21-25-22-42(38(51)55-5,33-27(13-17-47(23-25)24-39)26-11-8-9-12-30(26)45-33)29-19-28-31(20-32(29)54-4)46(3)35-41(28)15-18-48-16-10-14-40(7-2,34(41)48)36(49)43(35,53)37(44)50/h8-12,14,19-20,25,34-36,45,49,52-53H,6-7,13,15-18,21-24H2,1-5H3,(H2,44,50)/t25-,34+,35-,36-,39+,40-,41-,42+,43+/m1/s1; Key:HHJUWIANJFBDHT-KOTLKJBCSA-N

Vindesine, also termed Eldisine, is a semisynthetic vinca alkaloid derived from the flowering plant Catharanthus roseus. Like the natural (e.g. vinblastine and vincristine) and semisynthetic vinca alkaloids (e.g. vinorelbine and vinflunine) derived from this plant, vindesine is an inhibitor of mitosis that is used as a chemotherapy drug. By inhibiting mitosis, vinedsine blocks the proliferation of cells, particularly the rapidly proliferation cells of certain types of cancer. It is used, generally in combination with other chemotherapeutic drugs, in the treatment of various malignancies such as leukaemia, lymphoma, melanoma, breast cancer, and lung cancer.
