= Dysidea arenaria =

Scientific classification
- Kingdom: Animalia
- Phylum: Porifera
- Class: Demospongiae
- Order: Dictyoceratida
- Family: Dysideidae
- Genus: Dysidea
- Species: D. arenaria

Binomial name
- Dysidea arenaria Bergquist, 1965

Species of sponge

Dysidea arenaria is a species of marine sponge (poriferan) found in the Pacific Ocean. It is a member of the order Dictyoceratida, one of two sponge orders that make up the keratose or "horny" sponges in which a mineral skeleton is absent and a skeleton of organic fibers is present instead.

== Description ==
A single specimen of this species was collected in Palau and described as the holotype specimen in 1965. A more recent description based on three specimens collected near Papua New Guinea highlights prominent conules and relatively infrequent oscules. The color was reported as "sand" in the field and "middle brown" after preservation, although the color of the preserved Palau specimen was given as "greyish-white". Both descriptions emphasize the irregular, densely reticulated branch network. Fibers made of sand, spicules, and spongin are also present, and aid in distinguishing the species from relatives.

== Habitat ==
D. arenaria was originally identified in the Palau Islands and specimens have since been collected from a variety of locations in the Pacific. Along with other members of the genus, D. arenaria was listed as a rare invasive species found in Hawaii in a 2008 NOAA memorandum.

== Secondary metabolites ==
Numerous secondary metabolite molecules found in D. arenaria have been reported in the scientific literature, often with an interest in their bioactivity. For example, members of a class of cytotoxic molecules known as cryptophycins, originally isolated from cyanobacteria, have also been found in D. arenaria, where they were given the name arenastatins. However, since cyanobacteria are common symbionts of sponges, it has been suggested that bacteria may be the true origin in cases where sponge and bacterial metabolites closely resemble one another.

A series of sesquiterpenoid hydroquinones have also been isolated from D. arenaria, among which are two unusual examples with distinctive enantiomers of their drimane molecular skeleton. A sterol isolated from the species was reported as a rare example of a molecule capable of reversing multidrug efflux-mediated fungal resistance to the drug fluconazole.
