= Dysidea perfistulata =

Conservation status
- Near Threatened (IUCN 3.1)

Scientific classification
- Kingdom: Animalia
- Phylum: Porifera
- Class: Demospongiae
- Order: Dictyoceratida
- Family: Dysideidae
- Genus: Dysidea
- Species: D. perfistulata

Binomial name
- Dysidea perfistulata Pulitzer-Finali & Pronzato, 1980

Species of sponge

Dysidea perfistulata is a species of marine sponge. It is a member of the order Dictyoceratida, one of two sponge orders that make up the keratose or "horny" sponges in which a mineral skeleton is absent and a skeleton of organic fibers is present instead.
