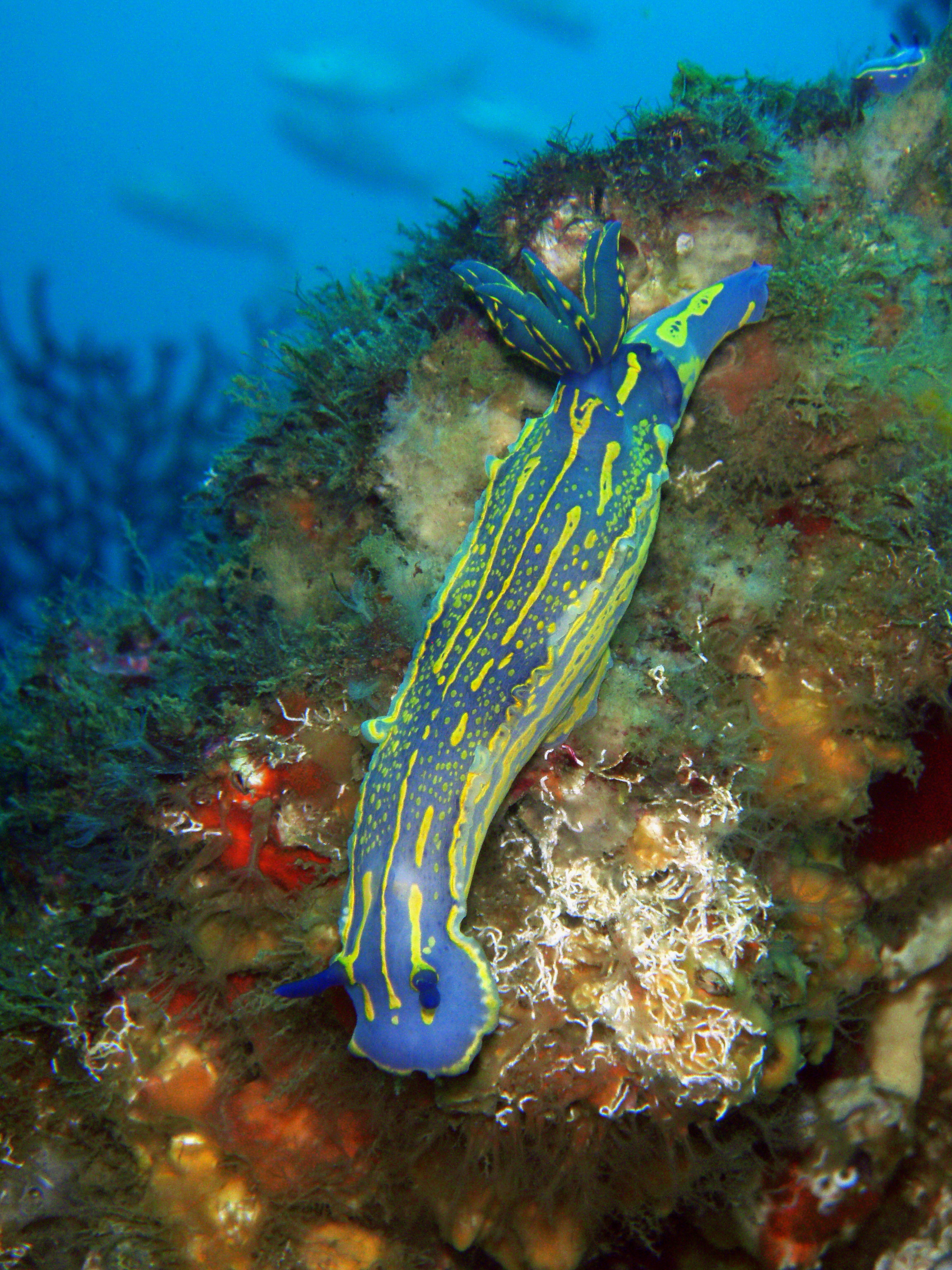
- On SS Rosslyn, Gibraltar, 17 m (56 ft)

Scientific classification
- Kingdom: Animalia
- Phylum: Mollusca
- Class: Gastropoda
- Order: Nudibranchia
- Family: Chromodorididae
- Genus: Felimare
- Species: F. picta

Binomial name
- Felimare picta (Schultz in Philippi, 1836)

Synonyms
- List: Chromodoris cantrainii Bergh, 1879; Chromodoris elegans (Cantraine, 1835); Chromodoris valenciennesi (Cantraine, 1841); Doris calcarae Verany, 1846; Doris elegans Cantraine, 1835 (invalid: junior homonym of Doris elegans Quoy & Gaimard, 1832); Doris nardi Verany, 1846; Doris picta Schultz in Philippi, 1836 (basionym); Doris scacchi Delle Chiaje, 1841; Doris valenciennesi Cantraine, 1841; Glossodoris edenticulata White, 1952; Glossodoris picta (Schultz in Philippi, 1836); Glossodoris valenciennesi (Cantraine, 1841); Glossodoris webbi (d'Orbigny, 1839); Goniodoris elegans (Cantraine, 1835); Hypselodoris edenticulata (White, 1952); Hypselodoris elegans (Cantraine, 1835); Hypselodoris picta (Schultz in Philippi, 1836); Hypselodoris valenciennesi (Cantraine, 1841); Hypselodoris webbi (d'Orbigny, 1839); Polycera webbi d'Orbigny, 1839

= Felimare picta =

Species of gastropod

Felimare picta, sometimes called the regal sea goddess is a species of colourful sea slug or dorid nudibranch, a marine gastropod mollusk in the family Chromodorididae. Atlantic Ocean species of Hypselodoris were all transferred to Felimare following a DNA phylogeny.

== Subspecies ==
Several species were formerly considered to be subspecies of Felimare picta but several have now been elevated to species rank.

- Felimare (Hypselodoris) picta azorica Ortea, Valdés & García-Gómez, 1996
- Felimare (Hypselodoris) picta lajensis (Troncoso, Garcia & Urgorri, 1998) is a species, Felimare lajensis (Troncoso, Garcia & Urgorri, 1998)
- Felimare (Hypselodoris) picta picta (Schultz in Philippi, 1836)
- Felimare (Hypselodoris) picta tema (Edmunds, 1981) is a species, Felimare tema (Edmunds, 1981)
- Felimare (Hypselodoris) picta webbi (d'Orbigny, 1839)
- Felimare (Hypselodoris) picta verdensis Ortea, Valdés & García-Gómez, 1996 is a species, Felimare tema (Edmunds, 1981)

== Distribution ==
The type locality of Felimare picta is Palermo, Sicily. Felimare picta lives on rocky seabeds throughout the Mediterranean Sea (Greece), European waters (Spain, Portugal), the Eastern North Atlantic Ocean (Azores, Canary Islands) and the Gulf of Mexico.

== Description ==
This nudibranch grows to about 13 cm (5.1 in) long and feeds on sponges of the genus Dysidea. They are typically large animals, often reaching 50–80 mm. The background colour is dark blue, almost black in some Atlantic specimens, while in the Mediterranean the oldest specimens are usually discoloured, becoming pale blue, somewhat violet.

The colouration changes with growth. The smallest animals (10 mm (0.39 in)) have the edge of the mantle with an irregular width and white colour, except for a yellowish band in the middle of the back, looking similar to Felimare gasconi or Felimare orsinii. They also have blackish, rounded spots scattered along the inner side of the edge. At 15–20 mm (0.59–0.79 in) the edge is already yellow in front of the rhinophores and behind the gill, there are still white areas between these areas and the mid-lateral. Between 20–25 mm (0.79–0.98 in) the edge of the mantle becomes totally yellow. The yellow colouration of the dorsum develops from three more or less discontinuous lines that end in the branchial orifice, without forming a circle around it, with only the middle line extending behind the gill. At the head the two lateral lines completely surround the rhinophore orifices of the adults but do not form a closed ring in the youngest ones; in all cases they tend to extend ahead of the rhinophores. In the Azorean specimens there are no orange continuous lines on the back, only spots; slightly aligned or irregularly distributed. In all cases, the Azores animals have a spotted design, those from the Canary Islands have lines and spots, while those from Madeira have the intermediate situation.

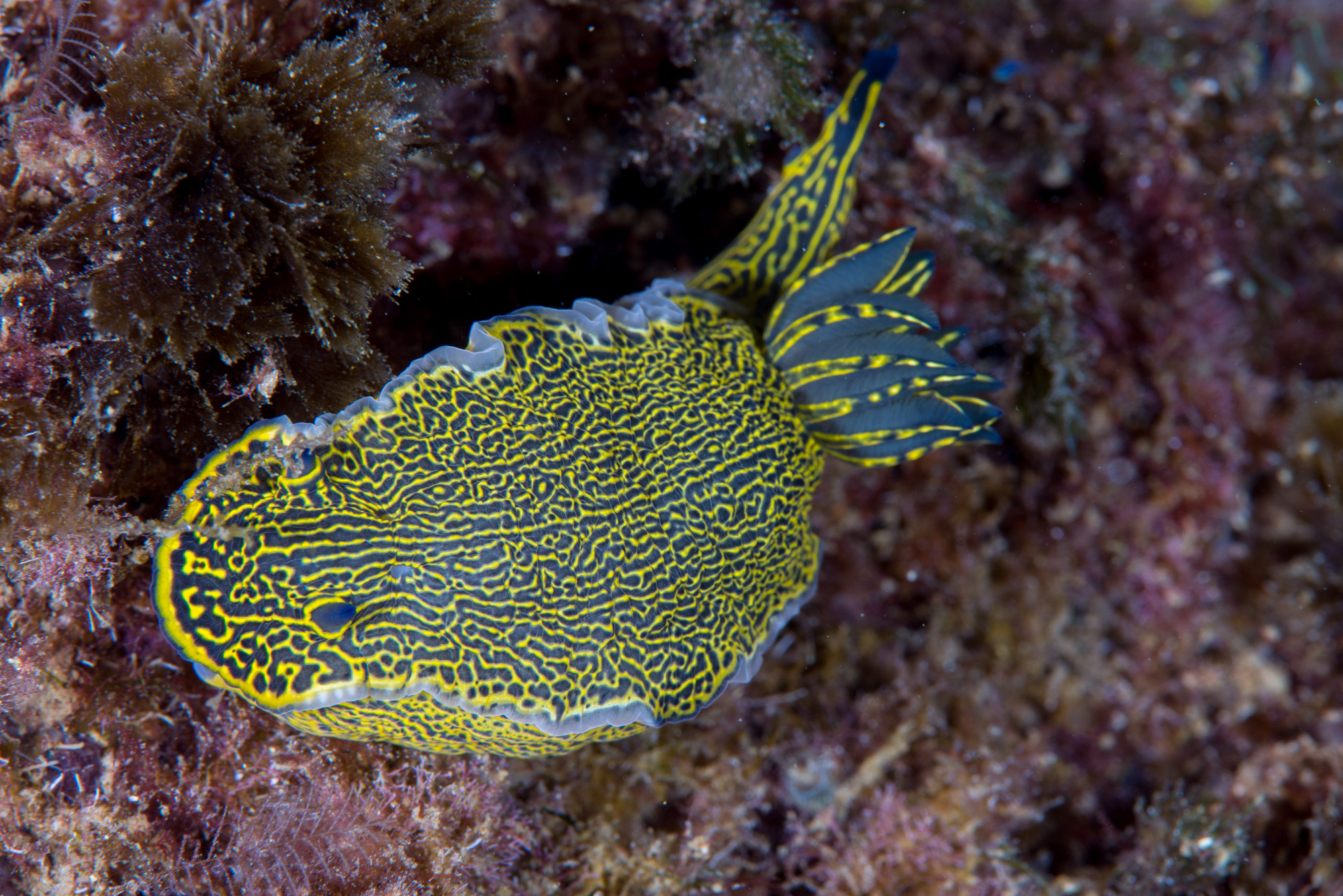
large individual, Arrecife, Lanzarote.

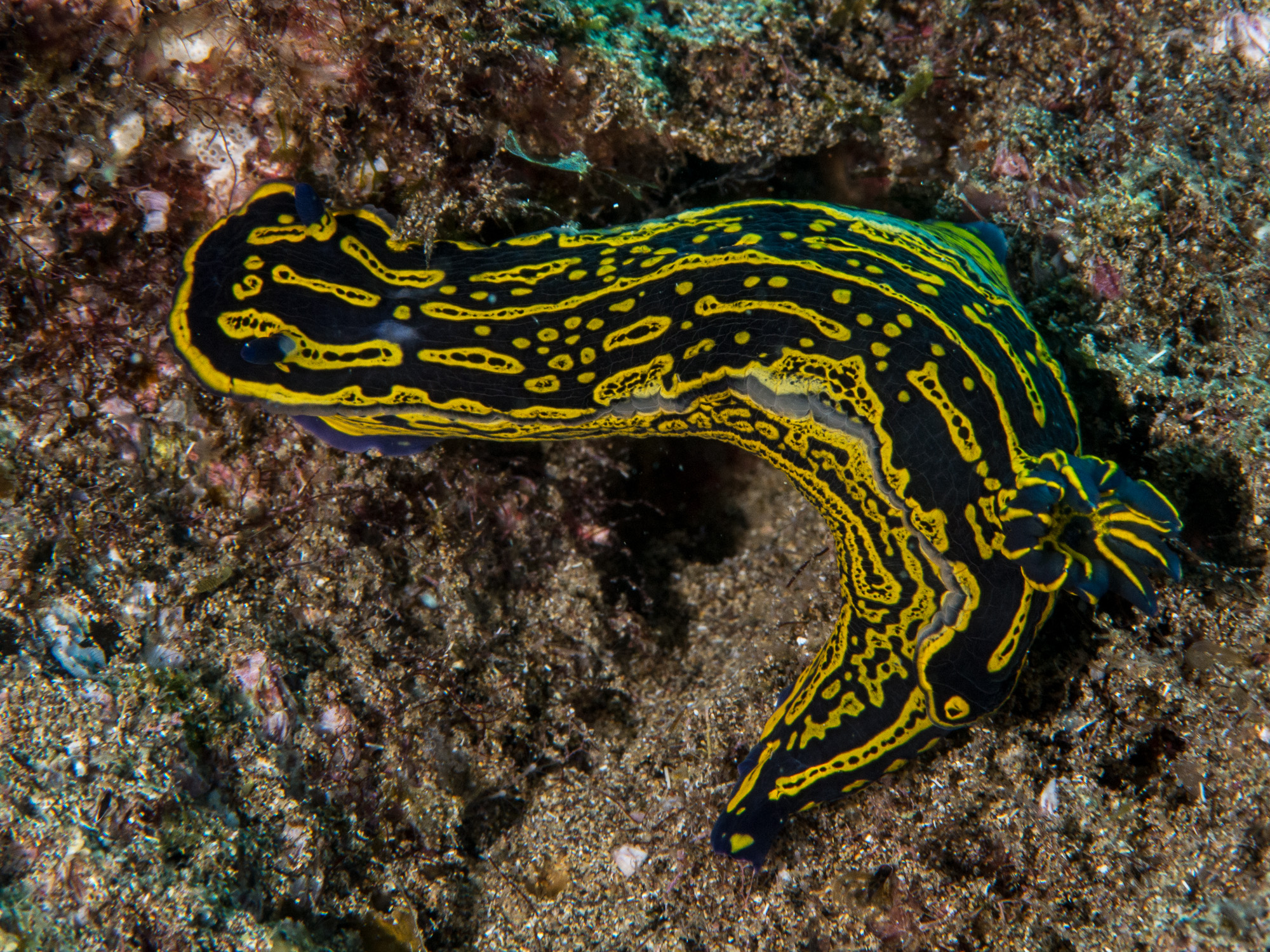
large individual with less yellow colouration, Lanzarote

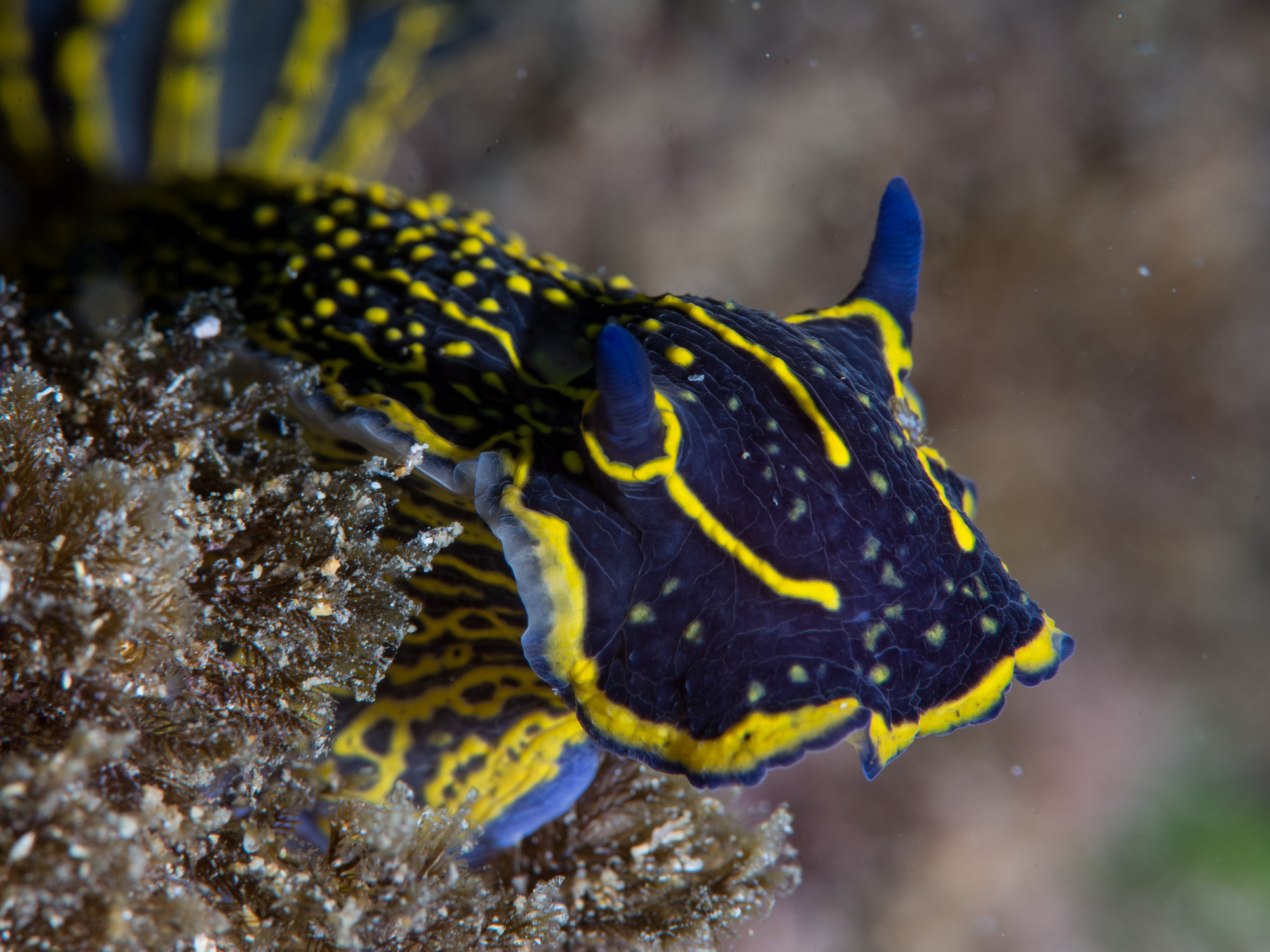
Head, Lanzarote

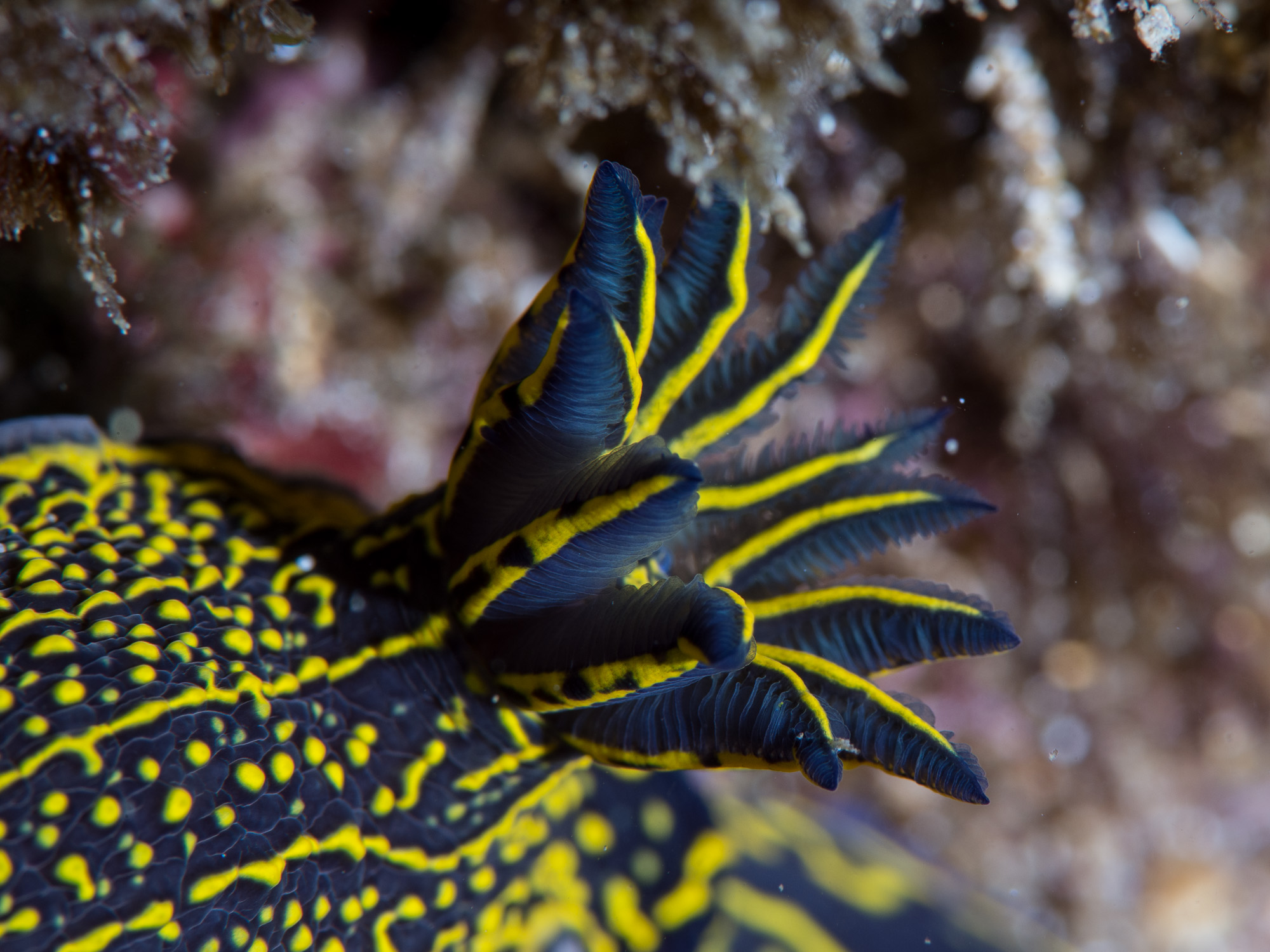
Gill, Lanzarote

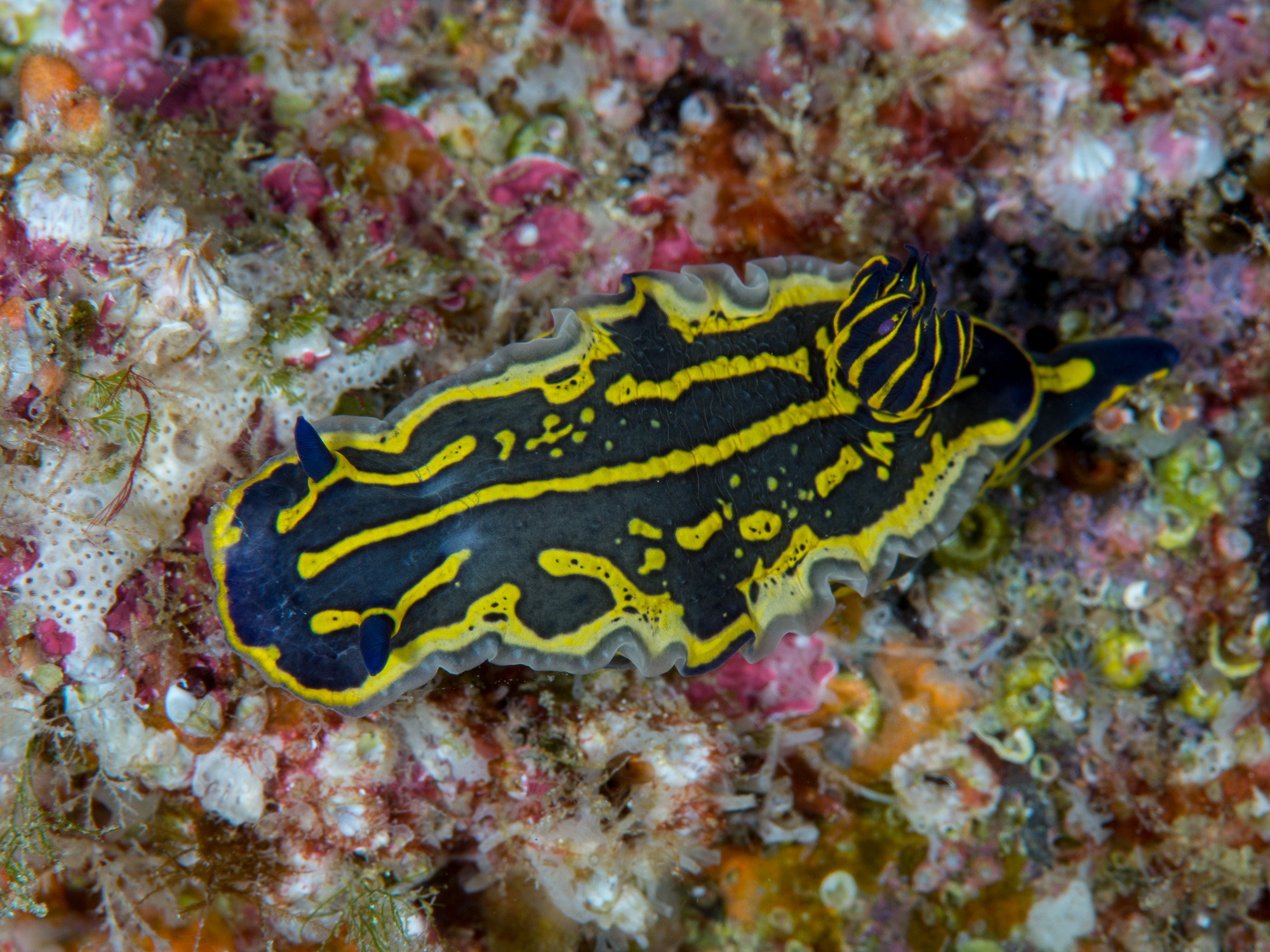
small individual, Lanzarote

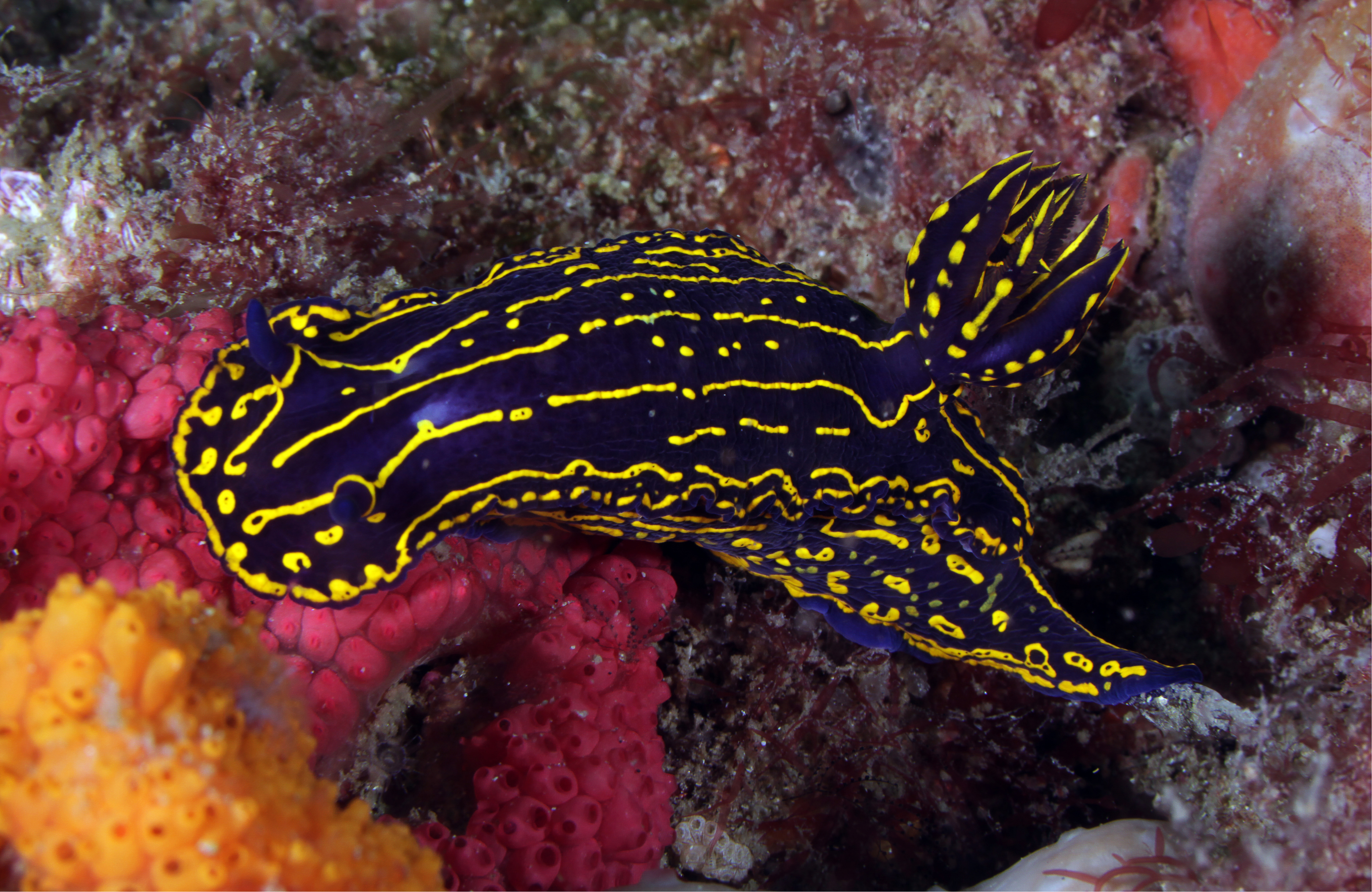
Gray's Reef National Marine Sanctuary, Savannah, Georgia, United States

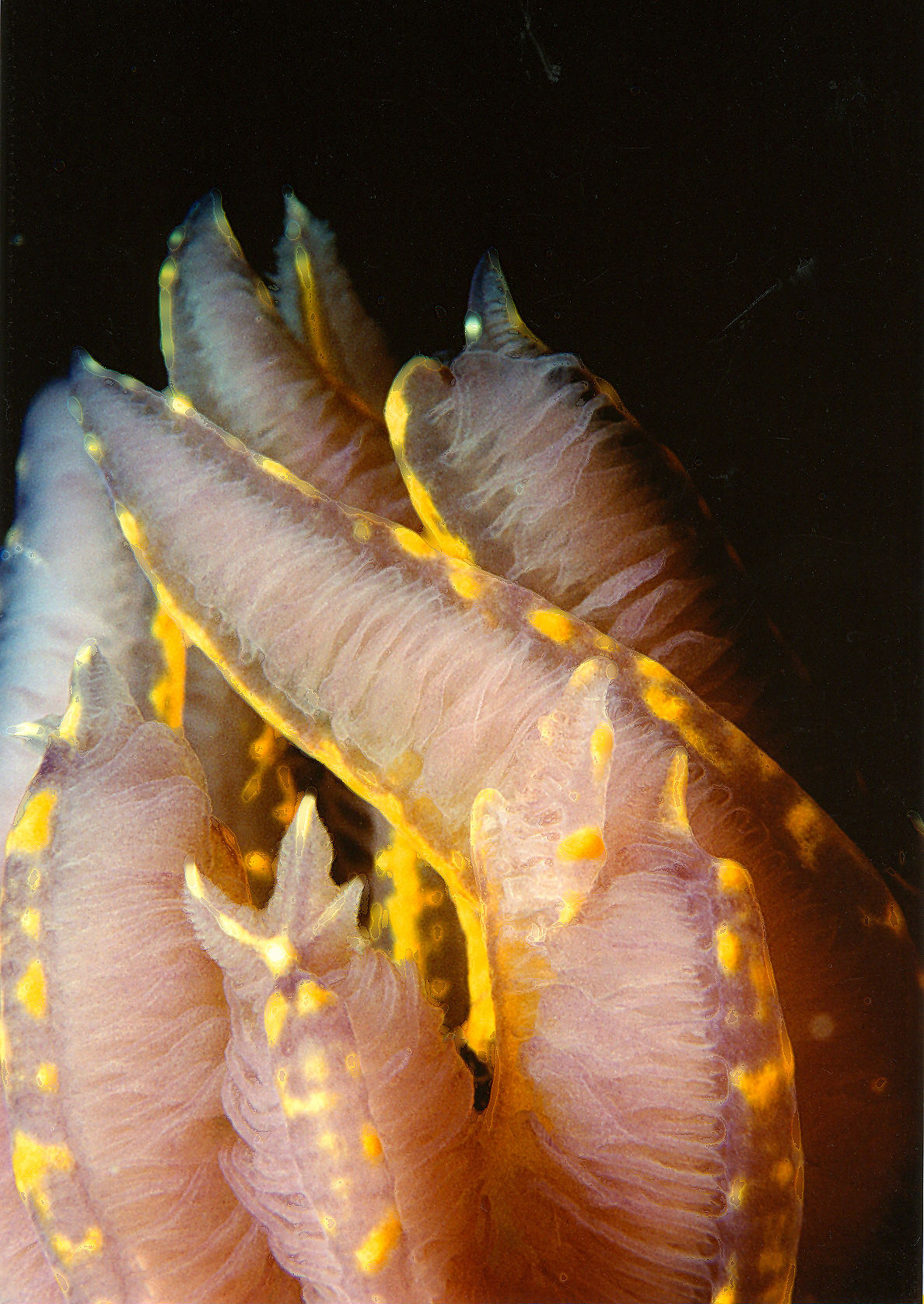
A close up of the gills

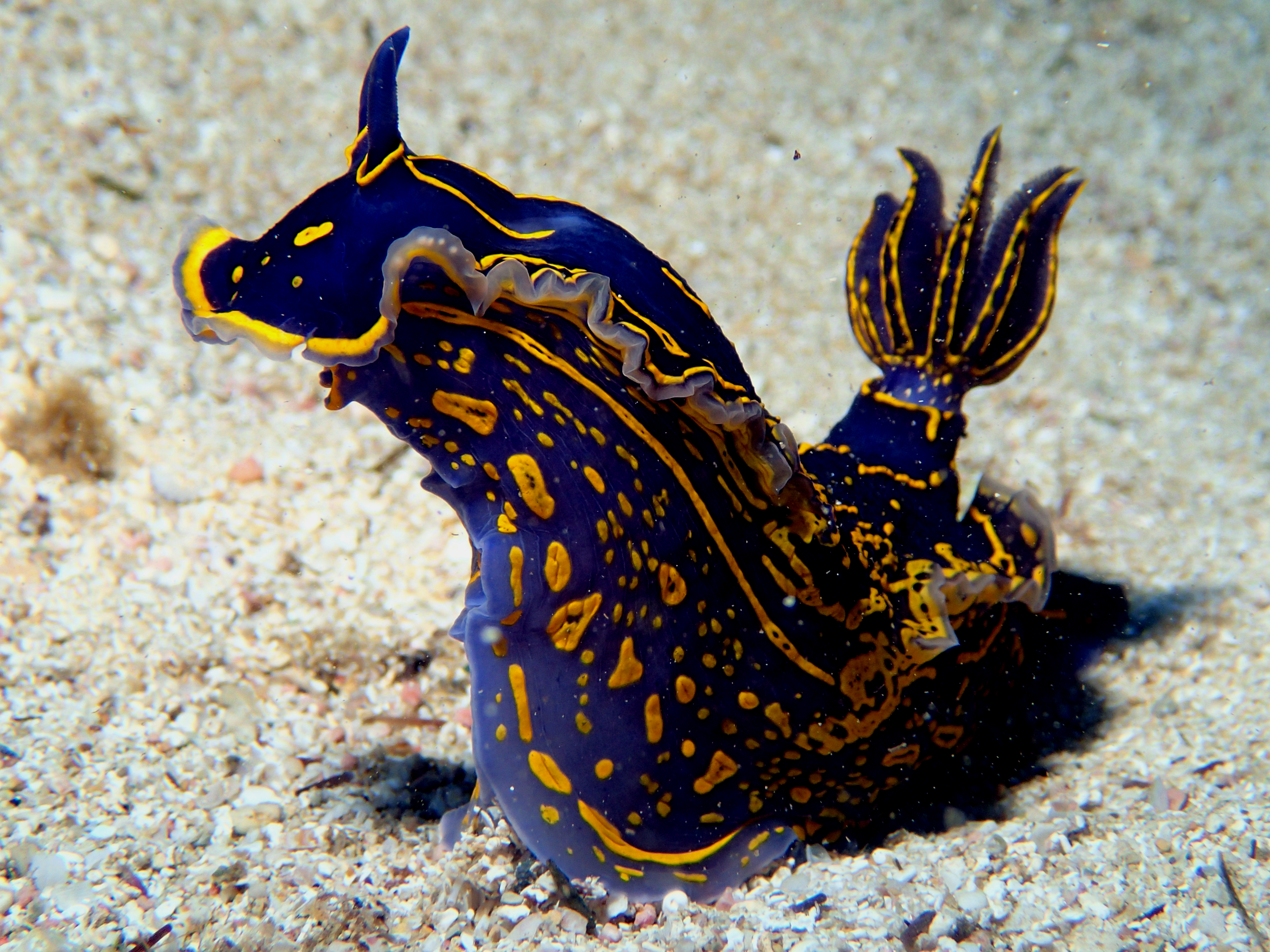
Giant Doris (Felimare or Hypselodoris picta picta) at Cirkewwa Marine Park, Malta

As the size of the animals increases, the dorsal lines become fragmented, increasing in number and a greater number of yellow spots appear between them, sometimes forming irregular circles. The edge of the mantle is also pigmented, so in large animals the yellow pigment can form on the back a cloud of yellow spots, leaving only remnants of the original lines on the branchial sheath and in front of and behind the rhinophores, although these may also disappear. On the side of the foot there is a more or less intense yellow line and numerous spots and circles whose number increases with the size of the animal. The smaller animals present a simple line, under which there is already at 15 mm a second dashed line of elongated spots. In the anterior part of the foot there is a yellow or orange line.

The rhinophores are uniformly coloured, dark blue in the Atlantic and violet blue in the Mediterranean. The gills are dark blue with a yellow rachis. In Mediterranean animals, the external aspect of this spine usually has two convergent lines at the apex, while in the Atlantic it is uniform. The largest number of gills observed was 12 in animals greater than 60 mm (2.4 in); frequently in large animals the apex of the gills is bifurcated and even branched. At the usual size of adults of other species, 15–20 mm (0.59–0.79 in), Felimare picta already has 7 gill leaves. This species presents defensive glandular formations at the edge of the mantle; the most developed are located at the level of the rhinophores and in the lateral and posterior gill areas, although they are found all along the edge of the mantle, except for the middle area of the body. In animals of 15 mm (0.59 in) there are 4-5 glands on the sides of the rhinophores and 6-7 behind the gill, there are also some white spots in the middle of the edge that have a similar appearance. In the 60–65 mm (2.4–2.6 in) specimens, between 5 and 12 mantle glands can be counted on the sides of the rhinophores and from 7 to 24 in the gill area.

== Habitat ==
Minimum recorded depth is 0 m (0 ft) and maximum recorded depth is 55 m (180 ft).
