= Citronia =

Scientific classification
- Kingdom: Animalia
- Phylum: Porifera
- Class: Demospongiae
- Order: Dictyoceratida
- Family: Dysideidae
- Genus: Citronia de Cook & Bergquist, 2002

Genus of sponges

Citronia is a genus of sea sponges in the family Dysideidae. It consists of one species, Citronia vasiformis (Bergquist, 1995), which Bergquist originally described as Euryspongia vasiformis, from a specimen found in the Baie de Citrons, New Caledonia at a depth of 8 to10 m.

In Australia it is found in waters off the Queensland coast.
