= Euryspongia =

Scientific classification
- Kingdom: Animalia
- Phylum: Porifera
- Class: Demospongiae
- Order: Dictyoceratida
- Family: Dysideidae
- Genus: Euryspongia; Row, 1911

Genus of sponges

Euryspongia is a genus of sponges belonging to the family Dysideidae.

The species of this genus are found in Indian and Pacific Ocean.

Species:

- Euryspongia arenaria Bergquist, 1961
- Euryspongia canalis
- Euryspongia coerulea Samaai, Pillay & Janson, 2019
- Euryspongia coreana Lee & Sim, 2007
- Euryspongia delicatula Berquist, 1995
- Euryspongia flabellum Kim, Lee & Sim, 2020
- Euryspongia heroni Pulitzer-Finali, 1982
- Euryspongia lactea Row, 1911
- Euryspongia lankesteri Lehnert & van Soest, 1999
- Euryspongia linea Kim, Lee & Sim, 2020
- Euryspongia lobata Bergquist, 1965
- Euryspongia phlogera de Laubenfels, 1954
- Euryspongia radicula Kim, Lee & Sim, 2020
- Euryspongia raouchensis Vacelet, Bitar, Carteron, Zibrowius & Pérez, 2007
- Euryspongia regularis Lee & Sim, 2007
- Euryspongia rosea Laubenfels, 1936
- Euryspongia semicanalis (Ridley, 1884)
- Euryspongia spina Kim, Lee & Sim, 2020
