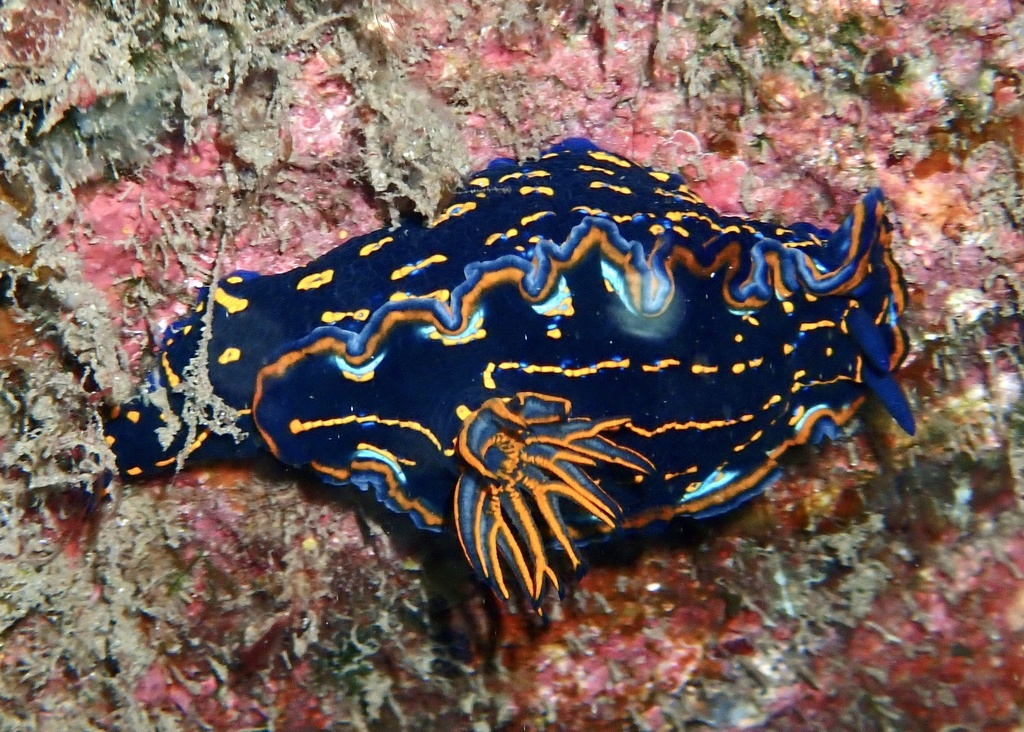

Scientific classification
- Kingdom: Animalia
- Phylum: Mollusca
- Class: Gastropoda
- Order: Nudibranchia
- Family: Chromodorididae
- Genus: Felimare
- Species: F. tema

Binomial name
- Felimare tema (Edmunds, 1981)

Synonyms
- Hypselodoris tema Edmunds, 1981; Hypselodoris picta tema Edmunds, 1981

= Felimare tema =

Species of gastropod

Felimare tema is a species of sea slug or dorid nudibranch, a marine gastropod mollusc in the family Chromodorididae.

== Distribution ==
This species was described from three specimens measuring 65–90 mm (2.6–3.5 in) collected near Tema, Ghana in depths of 55–0 m (180–0 ft). It has been reported from Senegal, Equatorial Guinea and Cape Verde.

== Description ==
Felimare tema is similar in appearance to Felimare picta but with a dark blackish green background colour and with a broad orange border to the mantle, interrupted by violet areas. DNA evidence shows it is clearly a distinct species from Felimare picta, but probably synonymous with Felimare verdensis.
