= Cryptophycin =

Chemical family

The common core structure of cryptophycins colored by division into four fragments, two amino and two hydroxycarboxylic acids.

Cryptophycins are a family of macrolide molecules that are potent cytotoxins and have been studied for potential antiproliferative properties useful in developing chemotherapy. They are members of the depsipeptide family.

== History ==
Cryptophycins were originally discovered in 1990 in cyanobacteria of the genus Nostoc. Cryptophycins were patented as antifungal agents with an unknown mechanism of action and subsequently identified as microtubule inhibitors. Closely related molecules were reported in the marine sponge Dysidea arenaria, which were first given the name arenastatins. However, since cyanobacteria are common symbionts of sponges, it has been suggested that bacteria may be the true origin in cases where sponge and bacterial metabolites closely resemble one another. Nevertheless, study of the structure-activity relationships between the two subgroups of molecules led to improved understanding of their cytotoxic effects.

== Mechanism of action ==
Cryptophycins are potent microtubule inhibitors, with a mechanism of action similar to that of vinca alkaloids. Treatment of cells with cryptophycins depletes microtubules through interaction with tubulin, thereby preventing cell division. Cryptophycins are capable of inducing apoptosis, possibly through other mechanisms in addition to that mediated by microtubule inhibition.

== Clinical studies ==
Members of the cryptophycin family have been studied as anti-tumor agents. Cryptophycin-52, a synthetic analog of natural product cryptophycins also known as LY355703, reached phase II clinical trials but was withdrawn due to side effects.

== Synthesis ==
Cryptophycins were first isolated from cyanobacteria but have subsequently been produced by chemical synthesis. Chemoenzymatic syntheses have also been reported.
