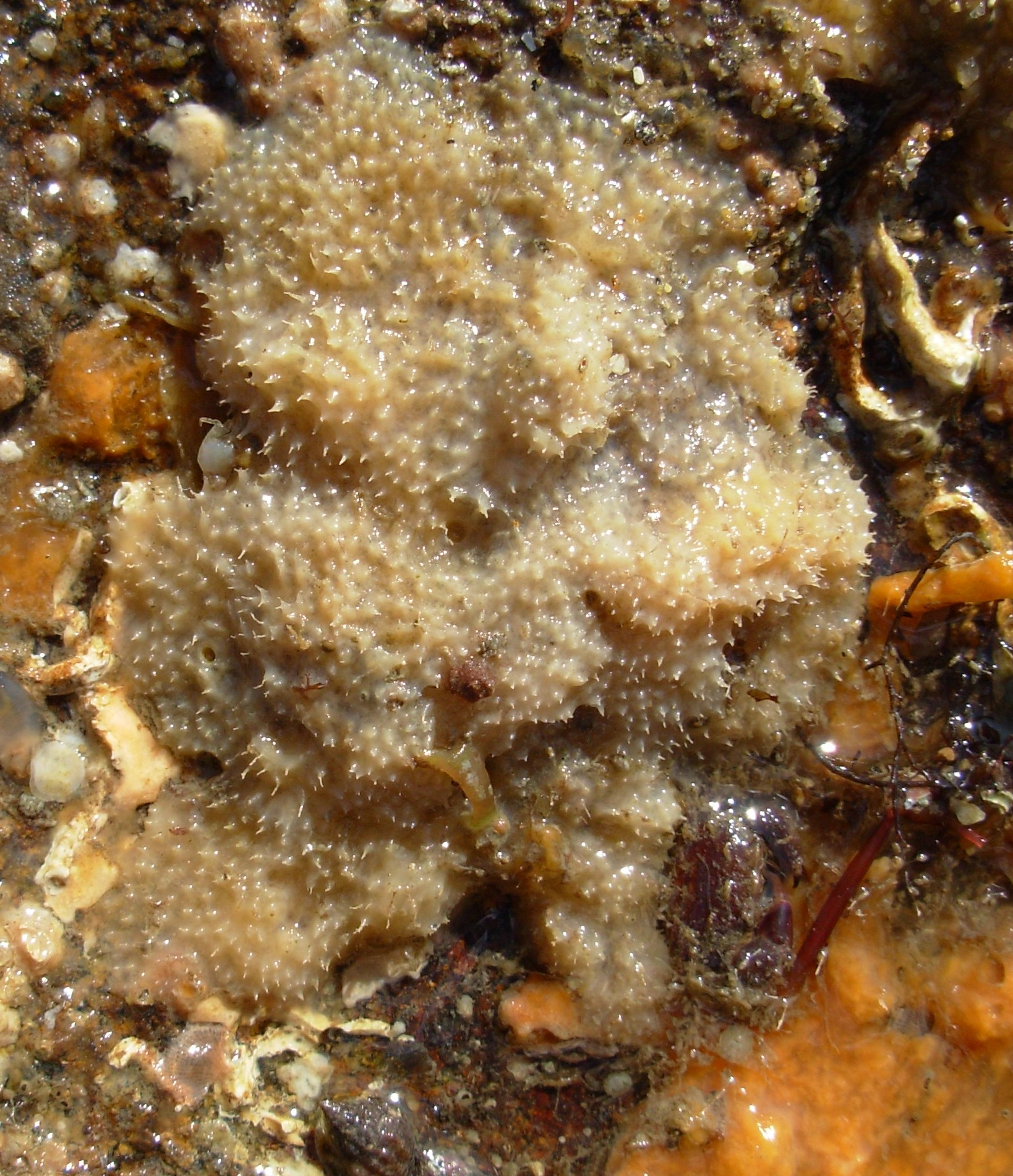
- Dysidea fragilis

Scientific classification
- Kingdom: Animalia
- Phylum: Porifera
- Class: Demospongiae
- Order: Dictyoceratida
- Family: Dysideidae
- Genus: Dysidea; Johnston, 1842

= Dysidea =

Genus of sponges

Dysidea is a genus of sponges belonging to the family Dysideidae.

The genus has cosmopolitan distribution.

Species:

- Dysidea aedificanda (Row, 1911)
- Dysidea amblia (de Laubenfels, 1930)
- Dysidea anceps (Hyatt, 1877)
- Dysidea arenaria Bergquist, 1965
- Dysidea avara (Schmidt, 1862)
- Dysidea cachui Carballo, Zubia & Ortega, 2006
- Dysidea cacos (Lendenfeld, 1888)
- Dysidea cana (Hyatt, 1877)
- Dysidea chalinoides (Burton, 1931)
- Dysidea chilensis (Thiele, 1905)
- Dysidea cinerea Keller, 1889
- Dysidea clathrata (Hentschel, 1912)
- Dysidea conica Bowerbank, 1873
- Dysidea corallina Kim, Lee & Sim, 2020
- Dysidea crassa (Dendy, 1905)
- Dysidea cristagalli Bergquist, 1961
- Dysidea dakini (Dendy & Frederick, 1924)
- Dysidea dendyi (Ferrer Hernandez, 1923)
- Dysidea digitata (Sollas, 1902)
- Dysidea distans (Lendenfeld, 1889)
- Dysidea dokdoensis Kang, Lee & Sim, 2020
- Dysidea dubia (Hyatt, 1877)
- Dysidea enormis (Hyatt, 1877)
- Dysidea etherea
- Dysidea etheria de Laubenfels, 1936
- Dysidea fasciculata (Wilson, 1925)
- Dysidea flabellum (Lendenfeld, 1886)
- Dysidea fragilis (Montagu, 1814)
- Dysidea frondosa Berquist, 1995
- Dysidea geomunensis Kim, Lee & Sim, 2020
- Dysidea glavea Kim, Lee & Sim, 2020
- Dysidea gracilis (Lendenfeld, 1889)
- Dysidea granulosa Bergquist, 1965
- Dysidea gumminea Ridley, 1884
- Dysidea hirciniformis Carter, 1885
- Dysidea hirsuta Kang, Lee & Sim, 2020
- Dysidea horrens (Selenka, 1867)
- Dysidea hydra Kang, Lee & Sim, 2020
- Dysidea implexa (Ridley, 1884)
- Dysidea incrustans (Schmidt, 1862)
- Dysidea incrustata (Dendy, 1905)
- Dysidea janiae (Duchassaing & Michelotti, 1864)
- Dysidea kenkriegeri Lehnert & Stone, 2015
- Dysidea laxa (Lendenfeld, 1889)
- Dysidea lehnerti Van Soest & Hooper, 2020
- Dysidea ligneana (Hyatt, 1877)
- Dysidea marshalli (Lendenfeld, 1889)
- Dysidea minna Hoshino, 1985
- Dysidea mureungensis Kim, Lee & Sim, 2020
- Dysidea navicularis (Lendenfeld, 1888)
- Dysidea nigrescens Berquist, 1995
- Dysidea nivea Kang, Lee & Sim, 2020
- Dysidea oculata (Burton, 1929)
- Dysidea pallescens (Schmidt, 1862)
- Dysidea perfistulata Pulitzer-Finali & Pronzato, 1980
- Dysidea ramoglomerata Carter, 1887
- Dysidea ramosa
- Dysidea ramsayi (Lendenfeld, 1888)
- Dysidea reformensis Carballo, Zubia & Ortega, 2006
- Dysidea robusta Vilanova & Muricy, 2001
- Dysidea sabulum Kang, Lee & Sim, 2020
- Dysidea sagum (Lendenfeld, 1888)
- Dysidea septosa (Lamarck, 1814)
- Dysidea spiculifera (Lendenfeld, 1888)
- Dysidea spiculivora (Dendy, 1924)
- Dysidea spinosa (Hyatt, 1877)
- Dysidea teawanui Kelly, Mc Cormack & Battershill, 2020
- Dysidea tenuifibra (Burton, 1932)
- Dysidea tuapokere Kelly, Mc Cormack & Battershill, 2020
- Dysidea tubulata Rutot, 1874
- Dysidea tupha (Martens, 1824)
- Dysidea tupha (Pallas, 1766)
- Dysidea uriae Carballo, Zubia & Ortega, 2006
- Dysidea variabilis (Duchassaing & Michelotti, 1864)
- Dysidea villosa (Lendenfeld, 1886)
- Dysidea violata Lee & Sim, 2007
