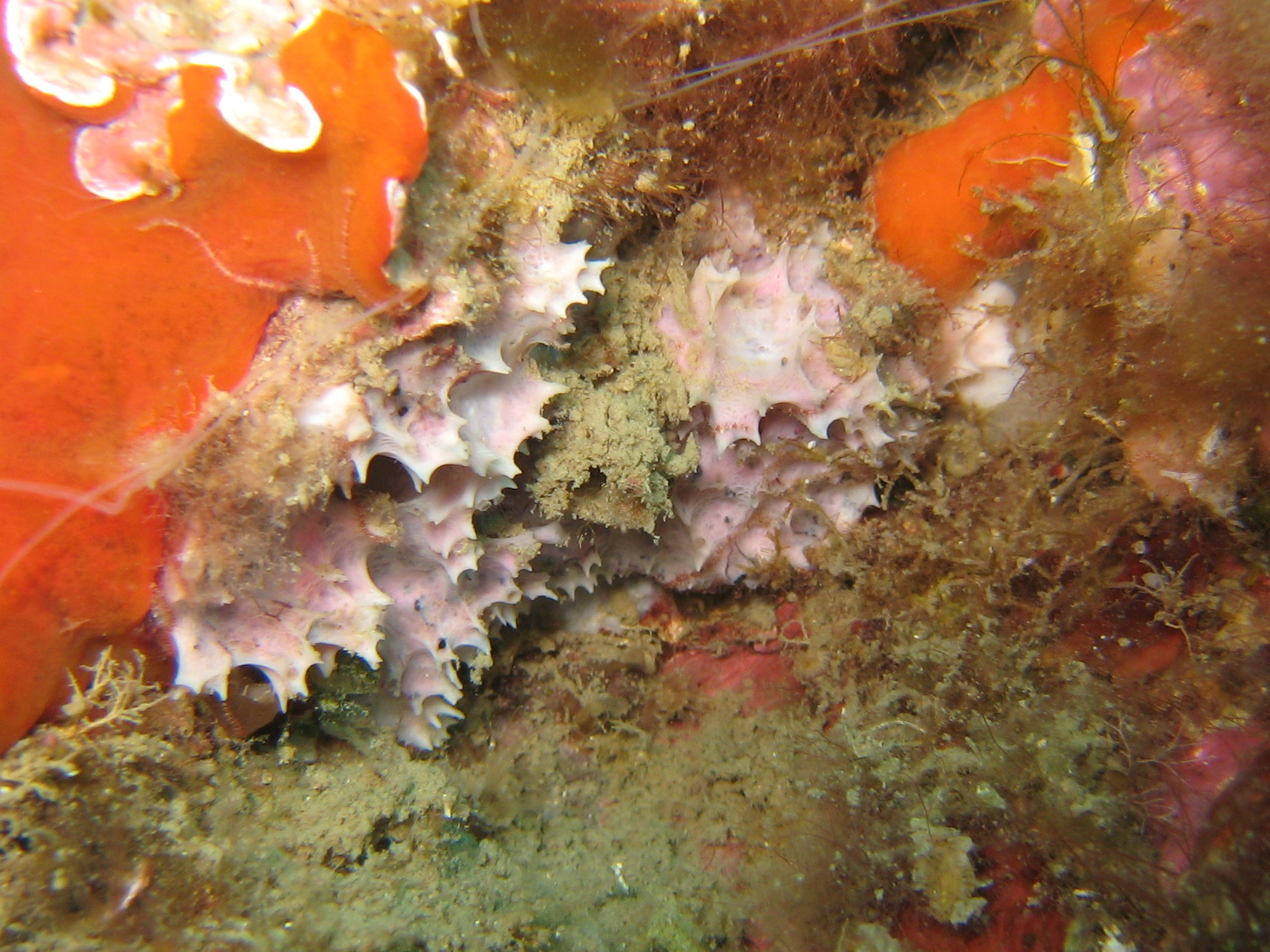
- Pleraplysilla spinifera

Scientific classification
- Kingdom: Animalia
- Phylum: Porifera
- Class: Demospongiae
- Order: Dictyoceratida
- Family: Dysideidae; Gray, 1867

= Dysideidae =

Family of sponges

Dysideidae is a family of sea sponges in the order Dictyoceratida.

== Genera ==
- Citronia Cook & Bergquist, 2002
- Dysidea Johnston, 1842
- Euryspongia Row, 1911
- Lamellodysidea Cook & Bergquist, 2002
- Pleraplysilla Topsent, 1905
