= Vinflunine =

Chemical compound

Clinical data
- AHFS/Drugs.com: International Drug Names
- License data: EU EMA: by INN
- Routes of administration: Intravenous
- ATC code: L01CA05 (WHO)

Legal status
- Legal status: EU: Rx-only; In general: ℞ (Prescription only)

Identifiers
- IUPAC name: methyl (2β,3β,4β,5α,12β,19α)- 4-(acetyloxy)- 15-[(4R,6R,8S)- 4-(1,1-difluoroethyl)- 8-(methoxycarbonyl)- 1,3,4,5,6,7,8,9-octahydro- 2,6-methanoazecino[4,3-b]indol- 8-yl]- 3-hydroxy- 16-methoxy- 1-methyl- 6,7-didehydroaspidospermidine- 3-carboxylate
- CAS Number: 162652-95-1
- PubChem CID: 10629256
- DrugBank: DB11641
- ChemSpider: 8804619
- UNII: 5BF646324K
- ChEBI: CHEBI:90241
- ChEMBL: ChEMBL2110725
- CompTox Dashboard (EPA): DTXSID30936722

Chemical and physical data
- Formula: C_{45}H_{54}F_{2}N_{4}O_{8}
- Molar mass: 816.944 g·mol^{−1}
- 3D model (JSmol): Interactive image
- SMILES: CC[C@@]12C=CCN3[C@@H]1[C@]4(CC3)[C@H]([C@]([C@@H]2OC(=O)C)(C(=O)OC)O)N(C5=CC(=C(C=C45)[C@]6(C[C@H]7C[C@H](CN(C7)CC8=C6NC9=CC=CC=C89)C(C)(F)F)C(=O)OC)OC)C
- InChI: InChI=1S/C45H54F2N4O8/c1-8-42-14-11-16-51-17-15-43(36(42)51)30-19-31(34(56-5)20-33(30)49(4)37(43)45(55,40(54)58-7)38(42)59-25(2)52)44(39(53)57-6)21-26-18-27(41(3,46)47)23-50(22-26)24-29-28-12-9-10-13-32(28)48-35(29)44/h9-14,19-20,26-27,36-38,48,55H,8,15-18,21-24H2,1-7H3/t26-,27+,36-,37+,38+,42+,43+,44-,45-/m0/s1; Key:NMDYYWFGPIMTKO-KLCPSUAYSA-N

Vinflunine (INN, trade name Javlor) is a novel fluorinated vinca alkaloid derivative undergoing research for the treatment of bladder cancer. It was originally discovered by the team of the Professor Jean-Claude Jacquesy (UMR CNRS 6514 – Poitiers University), developed by Laboratoires Pierre Fabre and was licensed to Bristol-Myers Squibb for development in certain countries, including the United States.

On November 23, 2007, Pierre Fabre Medicament and Bristol-Myers Squibb announced that they were terminating their license agreement for the development of vinflunine, and that Pierre Fabre were continuing "discussions with regulatory authorities and plan to file for the registration of vinflunine for bladder cancer in the first quarter of 2008."

== Approvals and indications ==
As of 2012, vinflunine was registered for use in Australia for "advanced or metastatic transitional cell carcinoma of the urothelial tract after failure of a prior platinum containing regimen," but is not covered under the Pharmaceutical Benefits Scheme.

As of 2016, vinflunine was the only commercially-approved agent in some countries for salvage therapy of urothelial carcinoma, (with approval based on the results of a phase III trial), with a reported median OS of about 6 months.

== Clinical trials ==
It has undergone a phase III clinical trial for advanced transitional cell carcinoma of the urothelial tract.
