= C21H26N2O3 =

The molecular formula C_{21}H_{26}N_{2}O_{3} may refer to:

- Corynanthine
- Dregamine
- Rauwolscine
- Rhazine
- Stemmadenine
- Tabernaemontanine
- Vincamine
- Yohimbine
