= Apparicine =

Names
- IUPAC name (19E)-2,7,16,17,19,20-Hexadehydro-3,7-seco-6-norcuran
- Systematic IUPAC name (2R,4E,5S)-4-Ethylidene-6-methylidene-1,3,4,5,6,7-hexahydro-2,5-ethanoazocino[4,3-b]indole

Identifiers
CAS Number	3463-93-2
3D model (JSmol)	Interactive image
ChEBI	CHEBI:78
ChEMBL	ChEMBL285671
ChemSpider	4444718
KEGG	C09036
PubChem CID	5320486
CompTox Dashboard (EPA)	DTXSID30415108
- InChI: InChI=1S/C18H20N2/c1-3-13-10-20-9-8-14(13)12(2)18-16(11-20)15-6-4-5-7-17(15)19-18/h3-7,14,19H,2,8-11H2,1H3/b13-3-/t14-/m1/s1 Key: LCVACABZTLIWCE-CRAFIKPXSA-N
- SMILES: C\C=C1\C[N@]2CC[C@@H]1C(=C)c1[nH]c3ccccc3c1C2

Properties
Chemical formula	C_{18}H_{20}N_{2}
Molar mass	264.372 g·mol^{−1}
Density	0.945875
log P	3.404
Acidity (pK_{a})	8.37
Refractive index (n_{D})	1.665
Dipole moment	0.552121
- Except where otherwise noted, data are given for materials in their standard state (at 25 °C [77 °F], 100 kPa). Infobox references

Apparicine is a monoterpenoid tricyclic indole alkaloid. It is named after Apparicio Duarte, a Brazilian botanist who studied the Aspidosperma species from which apparicine was first isolated. It was the first member of the vallesamine group of indole alkaloids to be isolated and have its structure established, which was first published in 1965. It has also been known by the synonyms gomezine, pericalline, and tabernoschizine.

== Biochemistry ==
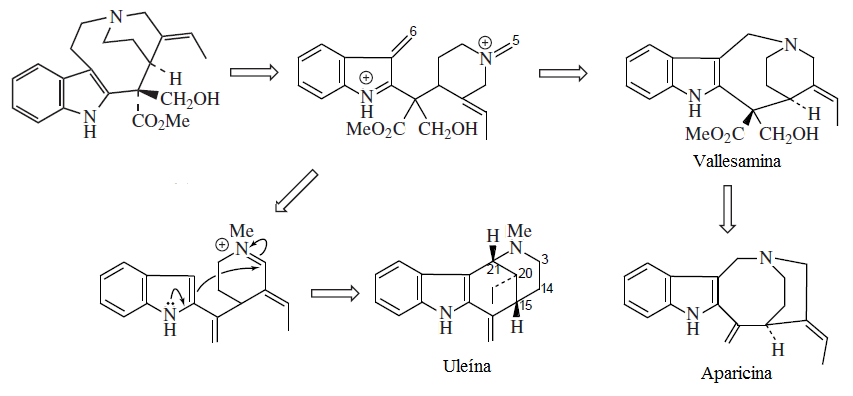
The biosynthesis of apparicine and uleine have a similar pathway.

The alkaloid has been isolated from seven species of Aspidosperma. It is the principal alkaloid found in the callus of Tabernaemontana elegans, and has also been identified in other Tabernaemontana species, including T. africana, T. divaricata, T. orientalis, and T. pachysiphon. In studies of T. pachysiphon, it was found that alkaloid content including that of apparicine was greatest in young leaves and leaves receiving greater shade, and varied with leaf age, plant age, and provenance.

Research on Aspidosperma pyricollum has led to the discovery that apparicine is biosynthesised from tryptophan by "loss of C-2 and retention of C-3". The biosynthesis of apparicine requires alteration of the usual tryptamine side chain with loss of C-1.

== Structure determination ==
Its structure was established through the methods of chemical decomposition, and the nascent field of nuclear magnetic resonance (NMR) decoupling using the ^{1}H isotope of hydrogen. Ultraviolet–visible spectroscopy showed that apparicine has a similar UV absorption to uleine, and their chromophores were found to be identical.

NMR decoupling experiments revealed that apparicine lacks an N-methyl signal and has one methylenic carbon atom between the nitrogen atom and the indole rings, allowing researchers to distinguish it from uleine. This was a notable early use of NMR decoupling to determine a chemical structure. Its carbon skeleton was found to be related but different from that of uleine, and the structures of vallesamine and O-acetyl-vallesamine to be related to apparicine.

Dehydrogenation of apparicine followed by oxidation with permanganate allowed location of the two piperidine ring carbon substituents.

== Applications ==
Apparicine may have several potential applications. In cell cultures, it has shown cytotoxicity against the experimental lymphocytic leukemia P388 cell line. It exhibits strong activity against poliovirus type 3 (PV3), and has moderate to strong activity against some human pathogens. It is also active at opioid receptors and has micromolar affinity for adenosine receptors. Apparicine has local analgesic properties. It inhibited xanthine oxidase as potently as allopurinol (IC_{50} = 0.65 μM).

== See also ==
- Catharanthine
- Pericine
- Tabernaemontanine
