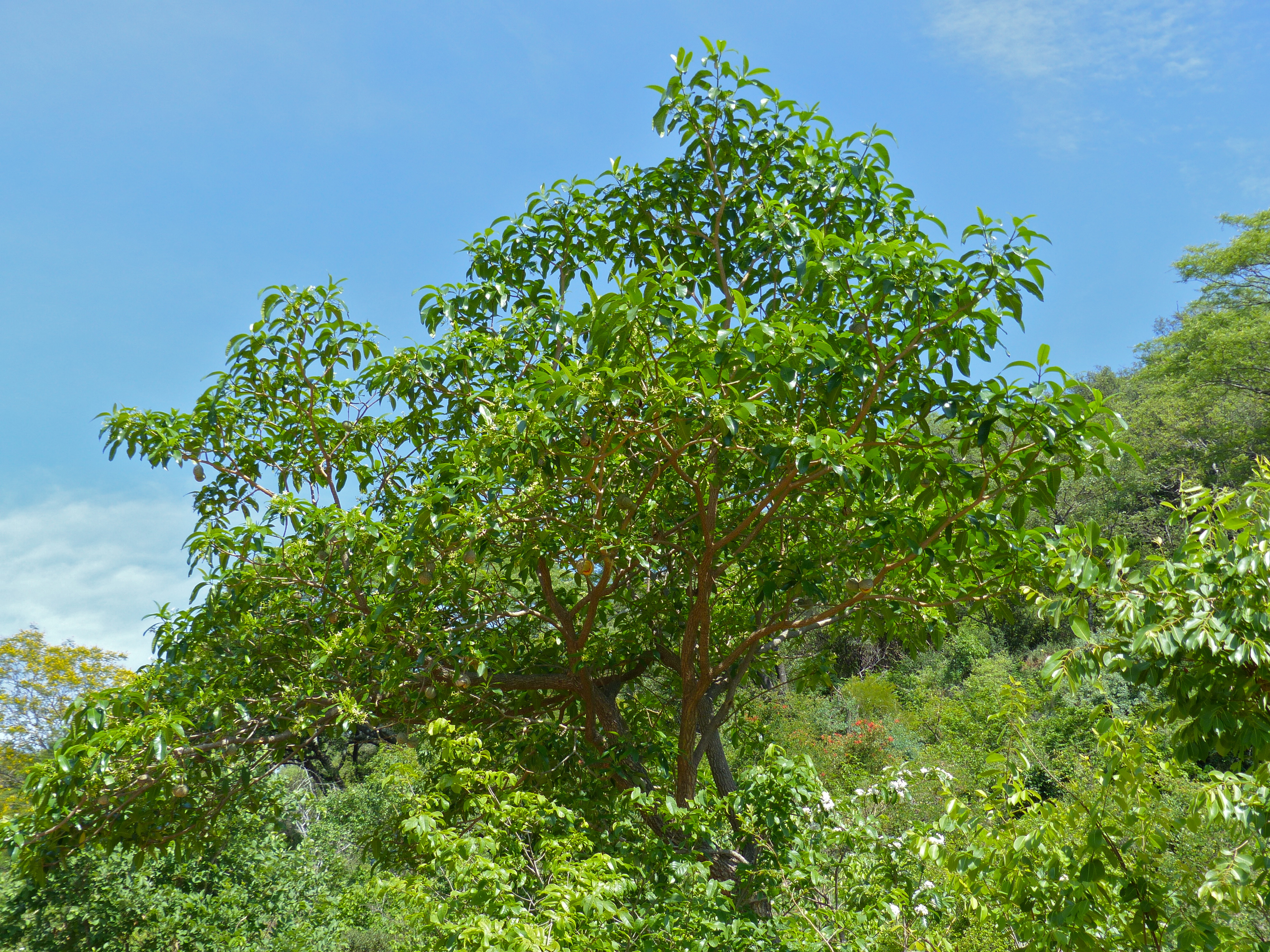

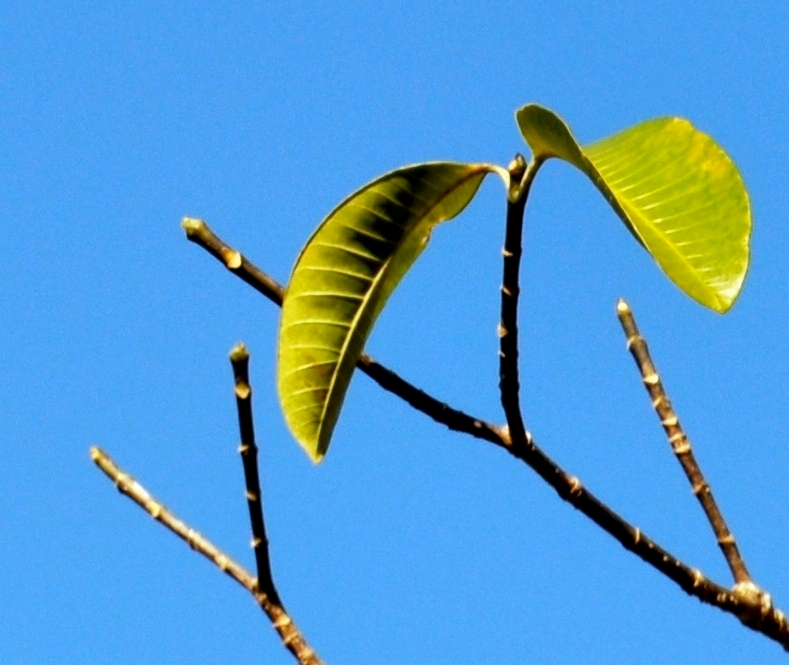
- Habit and the opposite, entire leaves in Limpopo, South Africa

Conservation status
- Least Concern (IUCN 3.1)

Scientific classification
- Kingdom: Plantae
- Clade: Tracheophytes
- Clade: Angiosperms
- Clade: Eudicots
- Clade: Asterids
- Order: Gentianales
- Family: Apocynaceae
- Genus: Tabernaemontana
- Species: T. elegans

Binomial name
- Tabernaemontana elegans Stapf

Synonyms
- Conopharyngia elegans (Stapf) Stapf; Leptopharyngia elegans (Stapf) Boiteau

= Tabernaemontana elegans =

Toad tree

African tree species

Tabernaemontana elegans, the toad tree, is a shrub or small tree in the family Apocynaceae. It is native to eastern Africa.

== Description ==
Tabernaemontana elegans grows up to 15 metres (50 ft) tall, with a trunk diameter of up to 30 centimetres (12 in). Its fragrant flowers feature white, creamy or pale yellow corolla lobes. Fruit consists of 2 separate ovoid or ellipsoid pods, up to 8 centimetres (3 in) each. The fruit has a warty appearance similar to the skin of a toad.

== Distribution and habitat ==
Tabernaemontana elegans grows in forests or bushland from sea level to 1,000 metres (3,300 ft) altitude. The species is native to Somalia, Kenya, Tanzania, Mozambique, Zimbabwe, Eswatini and South Africa.

== Uses ==
Tabernaemontana elegans has some local medicinal uses including the treatment of heart disease, cancer, tuberculosis and venereal diseases. The species is also used as an aphrodisiac. The Zulu name for this genus, iNomfi, refers to the use of their sticky, milky latex as bird-lime (glue).

== Chemistry ==
From a whole plant extract of Tabernaemontana elegans 18 indole alkaloids have been isolated: tabernaemontaninol, dregaminol, dregaminol-methylether, 3-R/S-hydroxy-tabernaelegantine B, 3-methoxy-tabernaelegantine C, apparicine, 16-S-hydroxy-16, 22-dihydro-apparicine, tubotaiwine, vobasine, vobasinol, dregamine, tabernaemontanine, iso-voacangine, 3-R/S-hydroxy-conodurine, tabernaelegantine A, B, C and D.

Fourteen indole alkaloids have been isolated in the callus culture of Tabernaemontana elegans (isovoacangine, 3-R/S-hydroxy-isovoacangine, 3-R/S-hydroxy-coronaridine, isositsirikine, geissoschizol, tabernaemontanine, vobasine, vobasinol, apparicine, 16-hydroxy-16,22-dihydro-apparicine, tubotaiwine, 3-R/S-hydroxy-conodurine and monogagaine) of which apparicine is the principal.

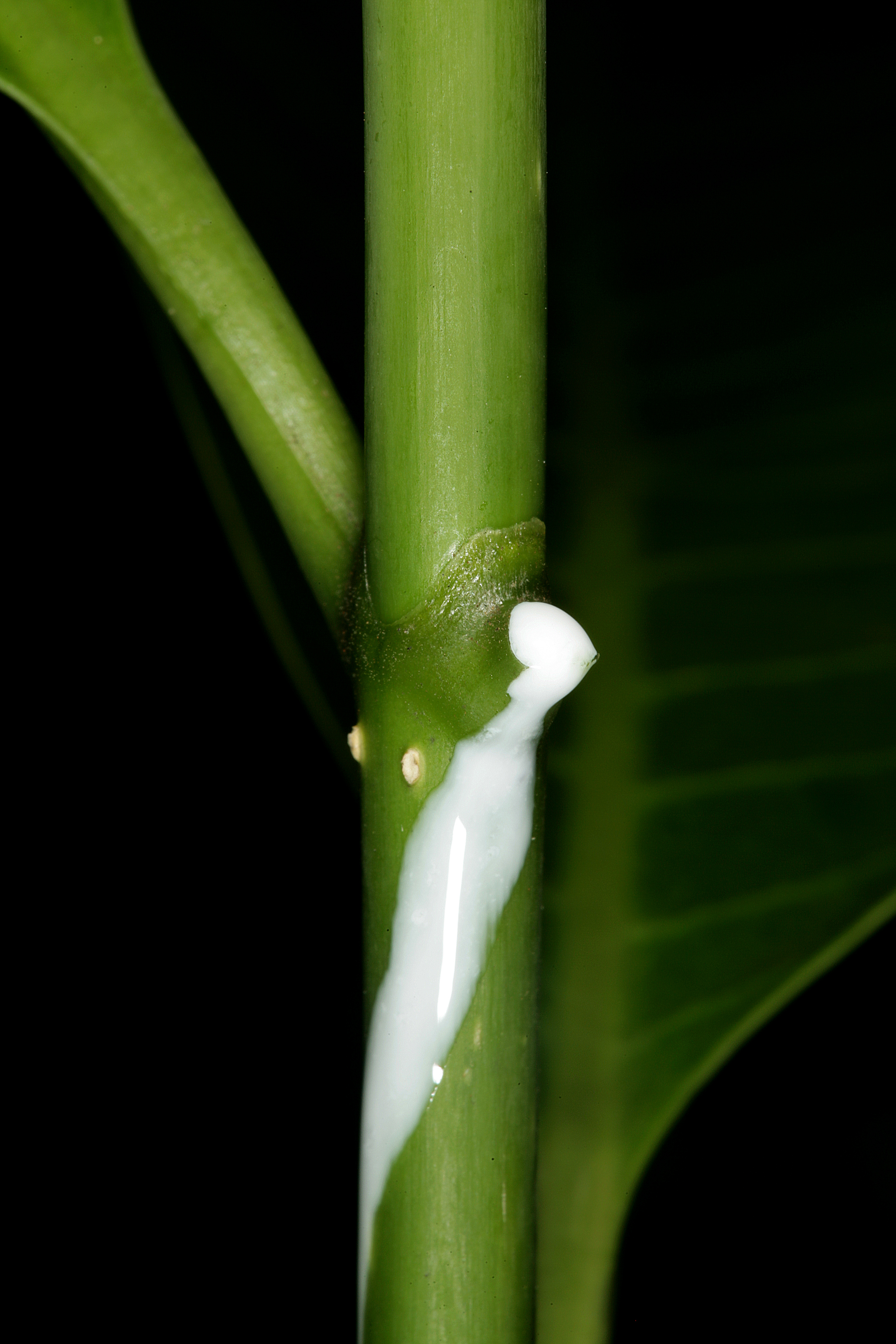
Milky latex

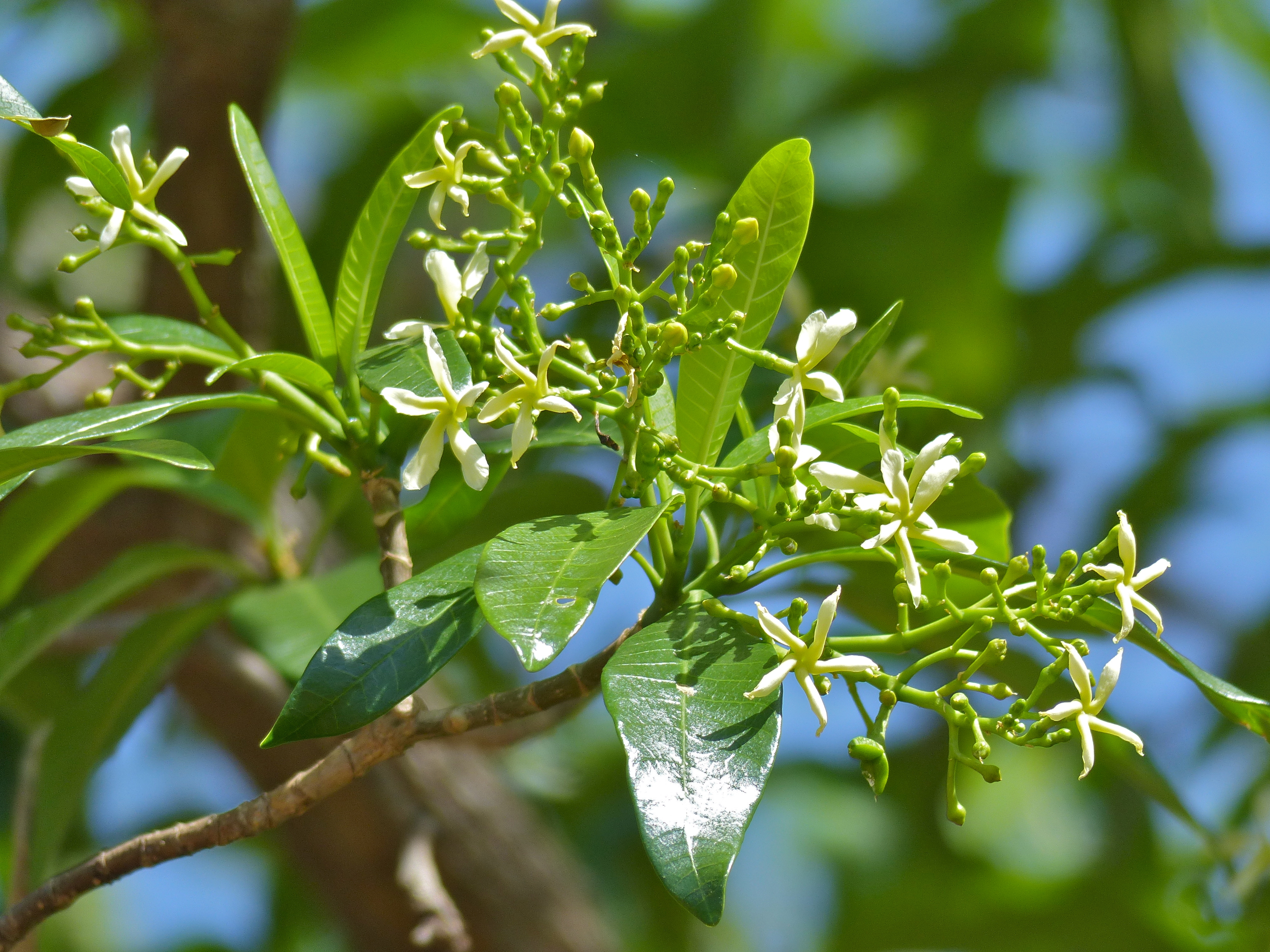
Inflorescence

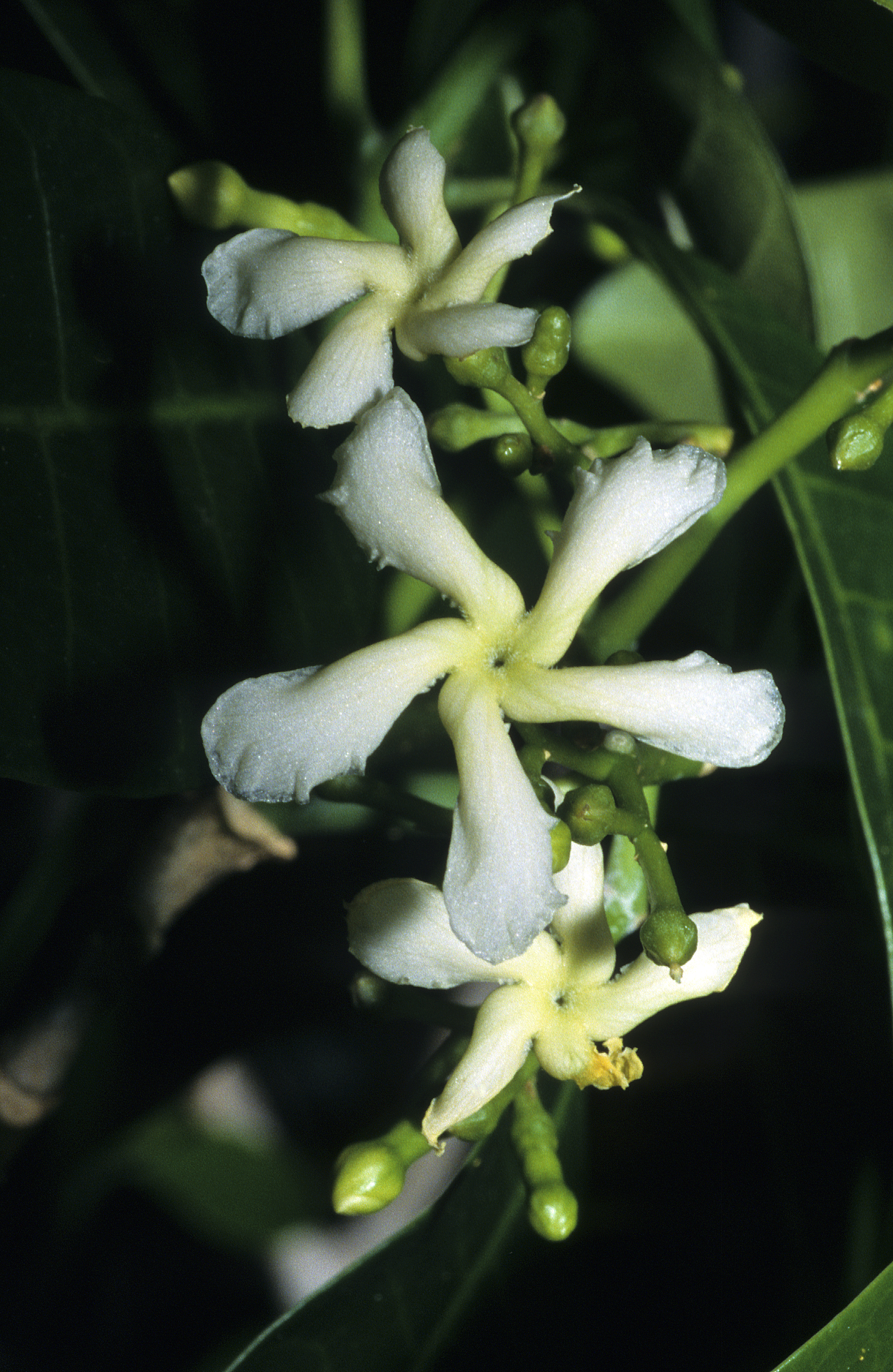
Flower

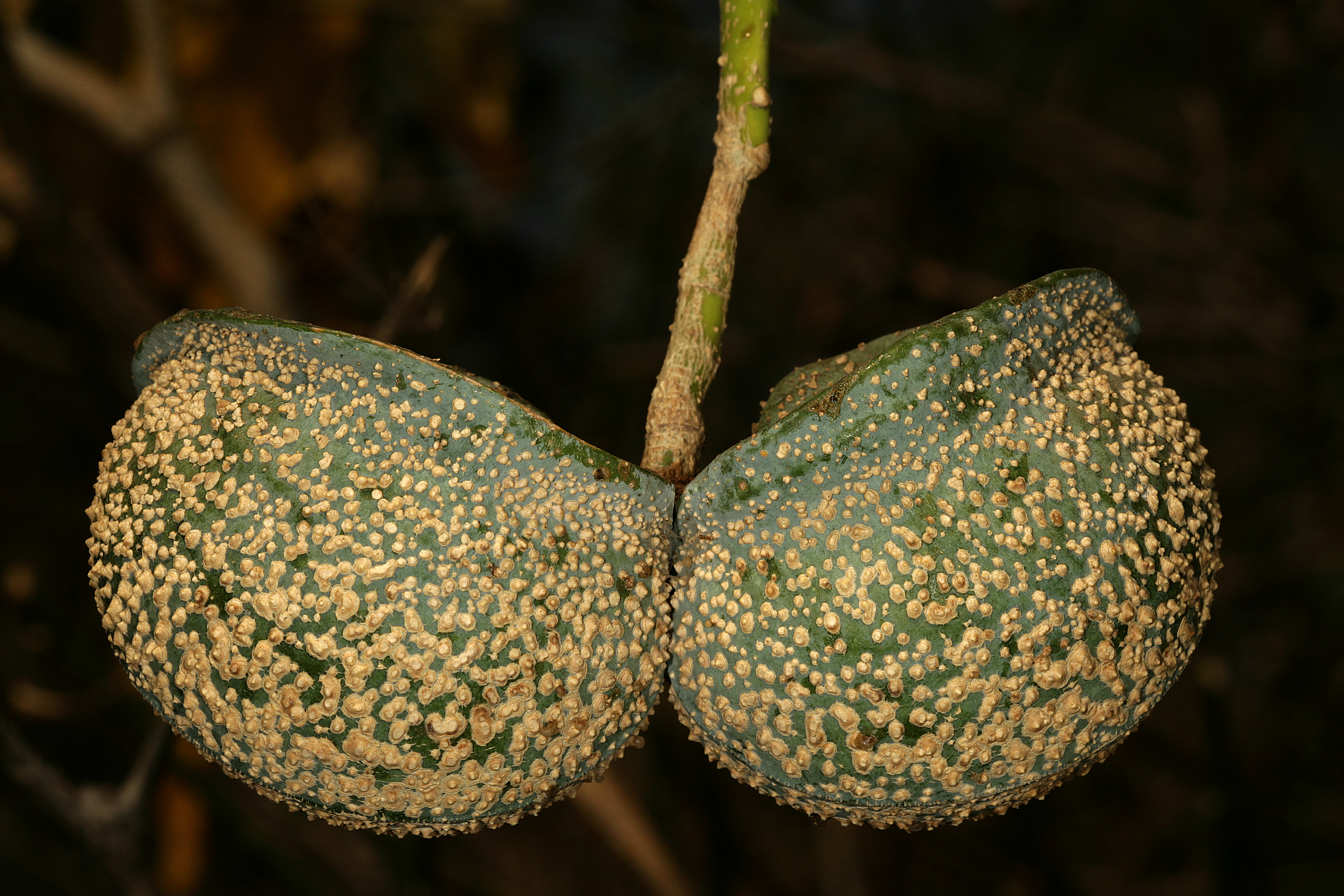
Warty, symmetrical fruit

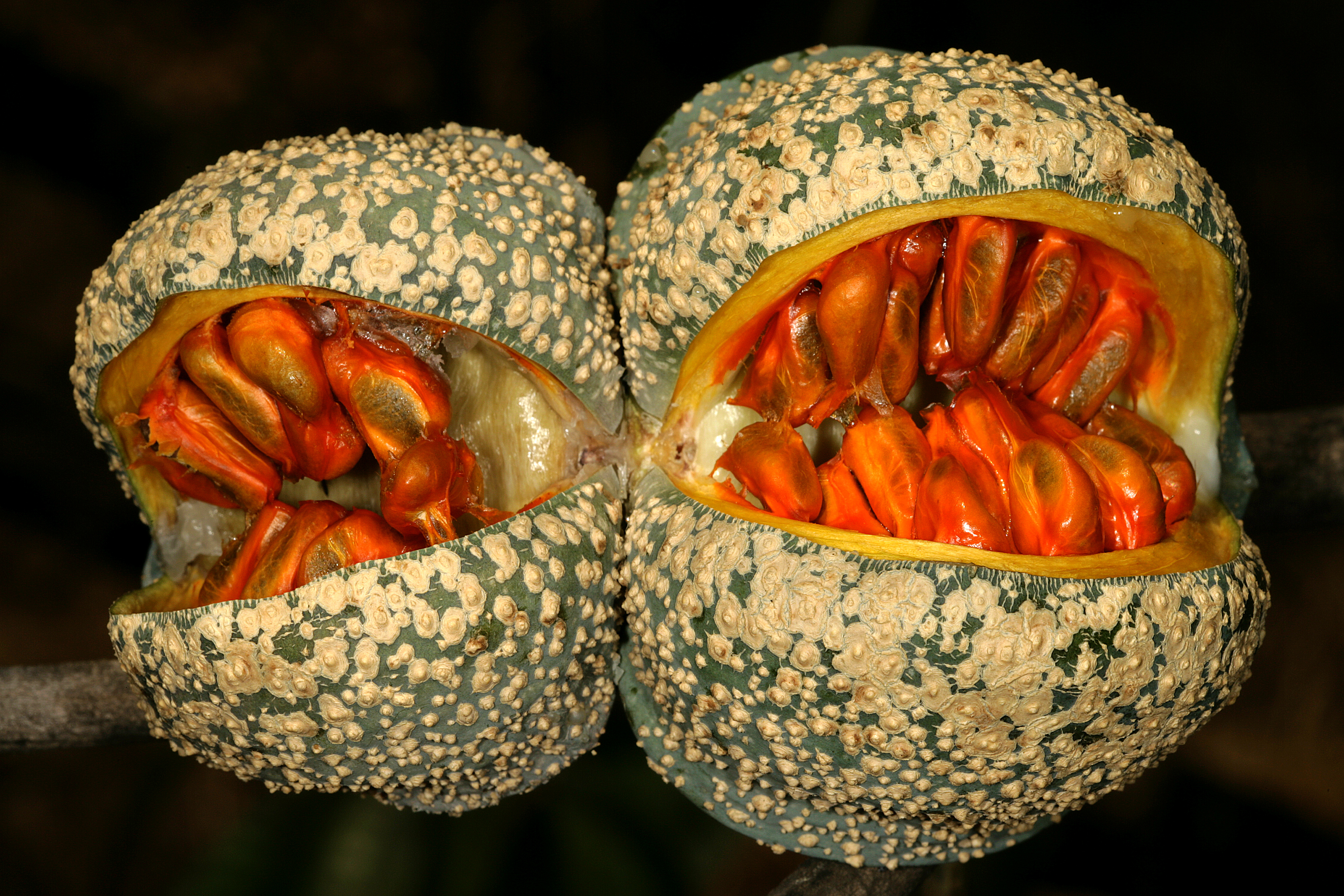
Visible seeds in dehisced fruit
