= Vobasine =

Names
- IUPAC name Methyl (1S,14R,15E,18S)-15-ethylidene-17-methyl-12-oxo-10,17-diazatetracyclo[12.3.1.0^{3,11}.0^{4,9}]octadeca-3(11),4,6,8-tetraene-18-carboxylate
- Preferred IUPAC name Methyl (19E)-3-oxovobasan-17-oate

Identifiers
CAS Number	2134-83-0
3D model (JSmol)	Interactive image
ChEBI	CHEBI:10015
ChemSpider	20119971
KEGG	C09253
PubChem CID	20840254
- InChI: InChI=1S/C21H24N2O3/c1-4-12-11-23(2)17-9-15-13-7-5-6-8-16(13)22-20(15)18(24)10-14(12)19(17)21(25)26-3/h4-8,14,17,19,22H,9-11H2,1-3H3/b12-4-/t14-,17-,19-/m0/s1 Key: TYPMTMPLTVSOBU-XJHWFDBESA-N
- SMILES: C/C=C\1/CN([C@H]2CC3=C(C(=O)C[C@@H]1[C@@H]2C(=O)OC)NC4=CC=CC=C34)C

Properties
Chemical formula	C_{21}H_{24}N_{2}O_{3}
Molar mass	352.434 g·mol^{−1}
- Except where otherwise noted, data are given for materials in their standard state (at 25 °C [77 °F], 100 kPa). Infobox references

Vobasine is a naturally occurring monoterpene indole alkaloid found in several species in the genus Tabernaemontana including Tabernaemontana divaricata.

== History ==
Vobasine was first reported by Renner in 1959 after its isolation from Voacanga africana. The two structurally related compounds, dregamine and tabernaemontanine, where its alkene (=CHCH_{3}) sidechain was reduced to ethyl groups in two configurations, had their relationship confirmed in the 1970s. Vobasine has been found in many plants of the dogbane (Apocynaceae) family including Tabernaemontana dichotoma.

== Synthesis ==
=== Biosynthesis ===
As with other Indole alkaloids, the biosynthesis of vobasine starts from the amino acid tryptophan. This is converted into strictosidine before further elaboration.

=== Chemical synthesis ===
The synthesis of alkaloids with the same carbon skeleton as vobasine began in the 1960s and has continued, with some work providing enantiospecific approaches to closely related compounds.

== Natural occurrence ==
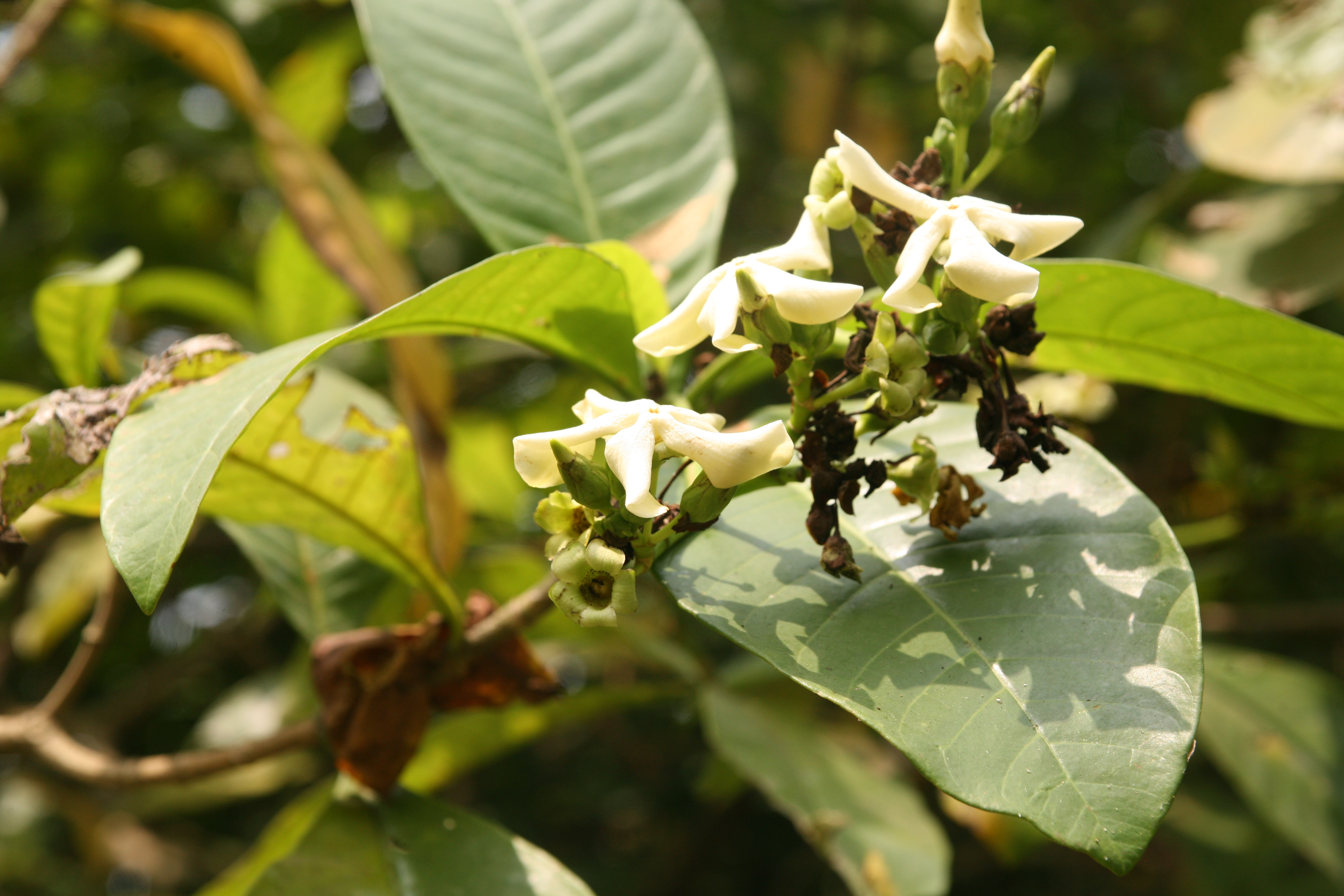
Voacanga africana, a source of vobasine

Vobasine is found commonly in the genera Tabernaemontana and Voacanga, including the species Ervatamia hirta, Tabernaemontana elegans, Tabernaemontana divaricata and Voacanga africana.

== Biochemistry ==
Plant metabolites have been of interest for their possible biological activity and alkaloids in particular are major subjects for ethnobotanical research. Vobasine has been studied, for example as a potential anti-cancer agent and for its hypotensive activity. However, the alkaloid itself has not been developed as a drug.

== Toxicity ==
Very high dose of vobasine at around 300 mg/kg may cause death through CNS and respiratory depression.

== See also ==
- Ervaticine
- Voacristine
