= Tabernaemontanine =

Names
- IUPAC name Methyl (20βH)-3-oxo-19,20-dihydrovobasan-17-oate
- Systematic IUPAC name Methyl (2S,5S,6S,14S)-5-ethyl-3-methyl-8-oxo-2,3,4,5,6,7,8,9-octahydro-1H-2,6-methanoazeceno[5,4-b]indole-14-carboxylate

Identifiers
CAS Number	2134-98-7
3D model (JSmol)	Interactive image
ChEBI	CHEBI:142075
ChEMBL	ChEMBL564301
ChemSpider	19989912
PubChem CID	12309360
- InChI: InChI=1S/C21H26N2O3/c1-4-12-11-23(2)17-9-15-13-7-5-6-8-16(13)22-20(15)18(24)10-14(12)19(17)21(25)26-3/h5-8,12,14,17,19,22H,4,9-11H2,1-3H3/t12-,14+,17+,19+/m1/s1 Key: FFVRRQMGGGTQRH-DTPILHQWSA-N
- SMILES: CC[C@@H]1CN([C@H]2Cc3c4ccccc4[nH]c3C(=O)C[C@@H]1[C@@H]2C(=O)OC)C

Properties
Chemical formula	C_{21}H_{26}N_{2}O_{3}
Molar mass	354.450 g·mol^{−1}
Melting point	207 °C (405 °F; 480 K)
- Except where otherwise noted, data are given for materials in their standard state (at 25 °C [77 °F], 100 kPa). Infobox references

Tabernaemontanine is a naturally occurring monoterpene indole alkaloid found in several species in the genus Tabernaemontana including Tabernaemontana divaricata.

== History ==
Tabernaemontanine was first reported in 1939 but its structure was only fully confirmed in the 1970s as there was confusion in the original literature regarding the configuration of the ethyl group in the piperidine ring of this alkaloid and its isomer dregamine, so that their identities had been reversed. Both compounds were isolated from plants of the dogbane (Apocynaceae) family including Tabernaemontana coronaria. They have structures that are reduced versions of vobasine.

== Biosynthesis ==
As with other Indole alkaloids, the biosynthesis of tabernaemontanine starts from the amino acid tryptophan. This is converted into strictosidine before further elaboration.

== Natural occurrence ==
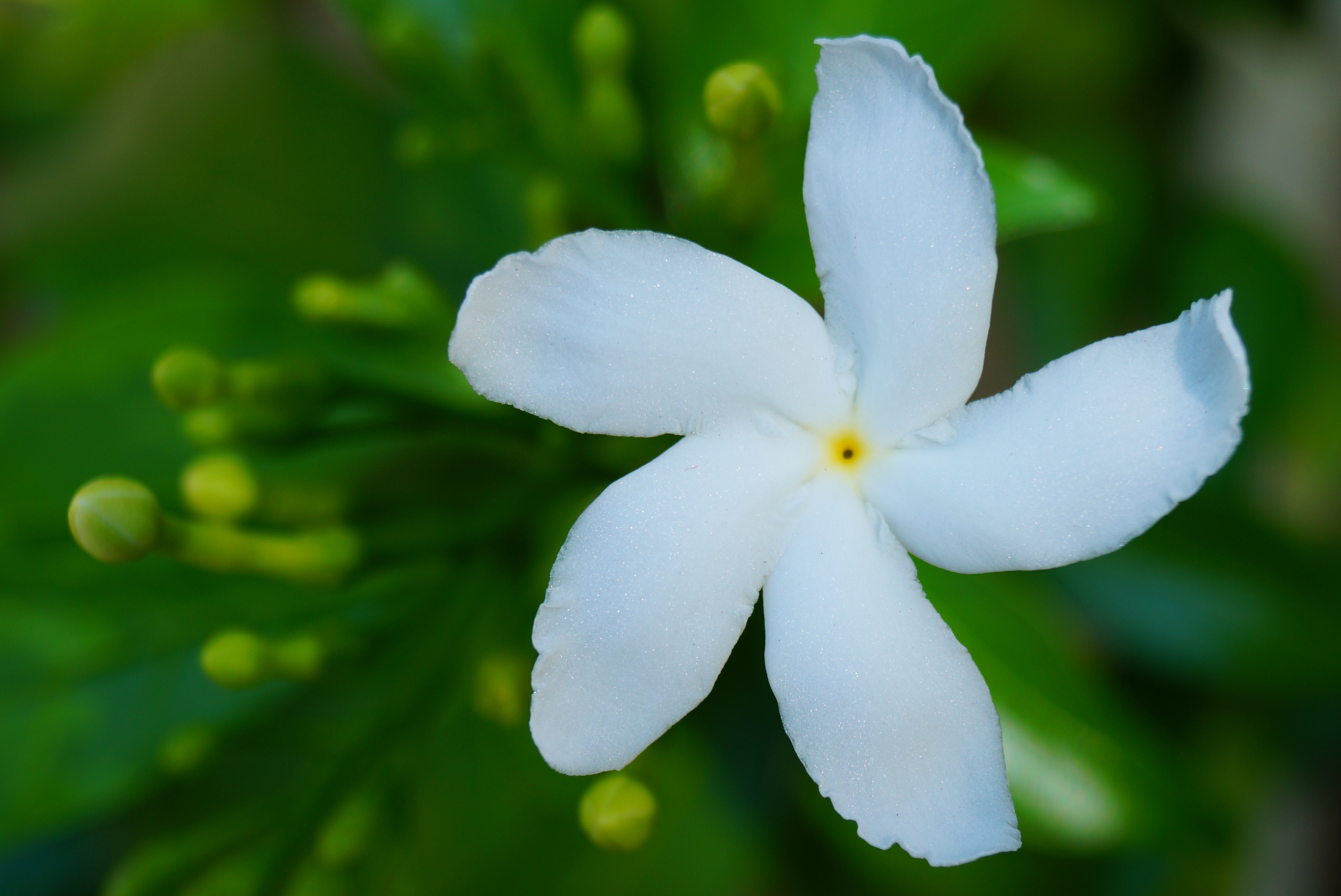
Tabernaemontana divaricata, a source of tabernaemontanin

Tabernaemontanine is found commonly in the genera Tabernaemontana and Kopsia, including the species Ervatamia hirta, Tabernaemontana elegans and Tabernaemontana divaricata. The latter species is known to produce many other alkaloids including catharanthine, ibogamine and voacristine.

== Research ==
Plant metabolites have been of interest for their possible biological activity and alkaloids in particular are major subjects for ethnobotanical research. Tabernaemontanine has been studied, for example as a potential anti-cancer agent, for its antimalarial activity and in antifertility research. However, the alkaloid itself has not been developed as a drug.

== See also ==
- Tabernanthine
- Ervaticine
