= Dregamine =

Names
- IUPAC name Methyl (20α)-3-oxo-19,20-dihydrovobasan-17-oate
- Preferred IUPAC name Methyl (2S,5R,6S,14S)-5-ethyl-3-methyl-8-oxo-2,3,4,5,6,7,8,9-octahydro-1H-2,6-methanoazeceno[5,4-b]indole-14-carboxylate

Identifiers
CAS Number	2299-26-5
3D model (JSmol)	Interactive image
ChEBI	CHEBI:141897
ChemSpider	19974575
PubChem CID	12309361
- InChI: InChI=1S/C21H26N2O3/c1-4-12-11-23(2)17-9-15-13-7-5-6-8-16(13)22-20(15)18(24)10-14(12)19(17)21(25)26-3/h5-8,12,14,17,19,22H,4,9-11H2,1-3H3/t12-,14-,17-,19-/m0/s1 Key: FFVRRQMGGGTQRH-YWKPPDPDSA-N
- SMILES: CC[C@H]1CN([C@H]2Cc3c4ccccc4[nH]c3C(=O)C[C@@H]1[C@@H]2C(=O)OC)C

Properties
Chemical formula	C_{21}H_{26}N_{2}O_{3}
Molar mass	354.450 g·mol^{−1}
- Except where otherwise noted, data are given for materials in their standard state (at 25 °C [77 °F], 100 kPa). Infobox references

Dregamine is a naturally occurring monoterpene indole alkaloid found in several species in the genus Tabernaemontana including Ervatamia hirta and Tabernaemontana divaricata.

== History ==
Dregamine was first reported in 1959 after its isolation from the apocynaceae Voacanga dregei (wild frangipani), a native small tree of southern Africa. The indole alkaloid tabernaemontanine is a closely related structure, differing only in the configuration of the ethyl group in the piperidine ring. Both structures are reduced versions of vobasine. There was confusion in the original literature regarding the configuration of the ethyl group in these molecules, so that their identities had been reversed.

== Synthesis ==
=== Biosynthesis ===
As with other Indole alkaloids, the biosynthesis of dregamine starts from the amino acid tryptophan. This is converted into strictosidine before further elaboration.

=== Chemical synthesis ===
Tryptophan was used as the starting material for a synthesis of dregamine. Its single chiral center provided the correct absolute stereochemistry required when elaborated to prepare the full multi-ring system of the target product.

== Natural occurrence ==
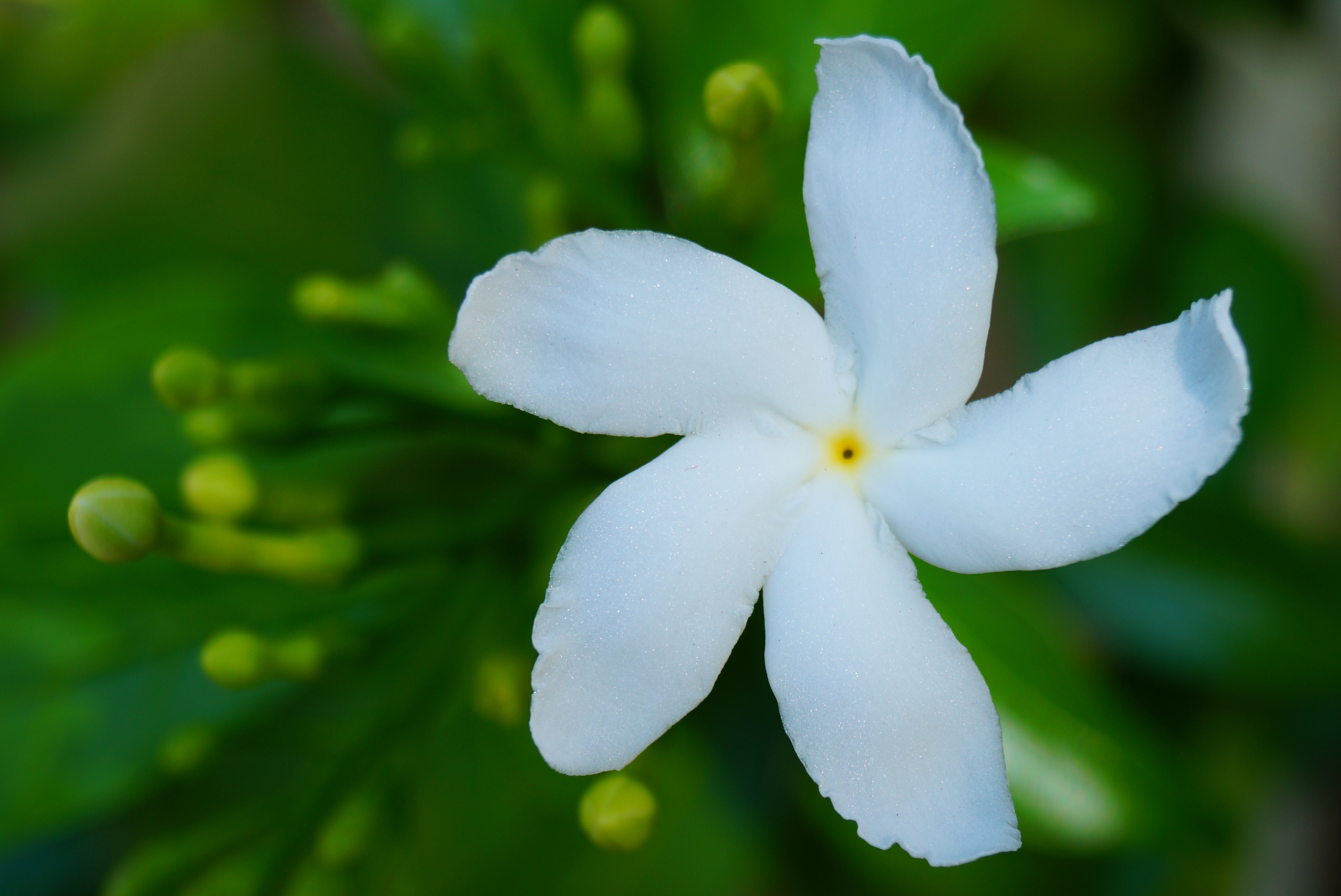
Tabernaemontana divaricata, a source of dregamine

Dregamine is found in plants of the genera Voacanga (e.g. Voacanga dregei) and Tabernaemontana including Ervatamia hirta, Ervatamia malaccensis and Tabernaemontana divaricata. The latter species is known to produce many other alkaloids including catharanthine, ibogamine and voacristine.

== Research ==
Plant metabolites have long been studied for their biological activity and alkaloids in particular are major subjects for ethnobotanical research. Dragamine has been studied, for example as a potential anti-cancer agent, for its antimalarial activity and in antifertility research. However, the alkaloid itself has not been developed as a drug and is known to be cardiotoxic.

== See also ==
- Conodurine
- Vincamine
