= C43H52N4O5 =

The molecular formula C_{43}H_{52}N_{4}O_{5} (molar mass: 704.912 g/mol, exact mass: 704.3938 u) may refer to:

- Conodurine
- Voacamine
