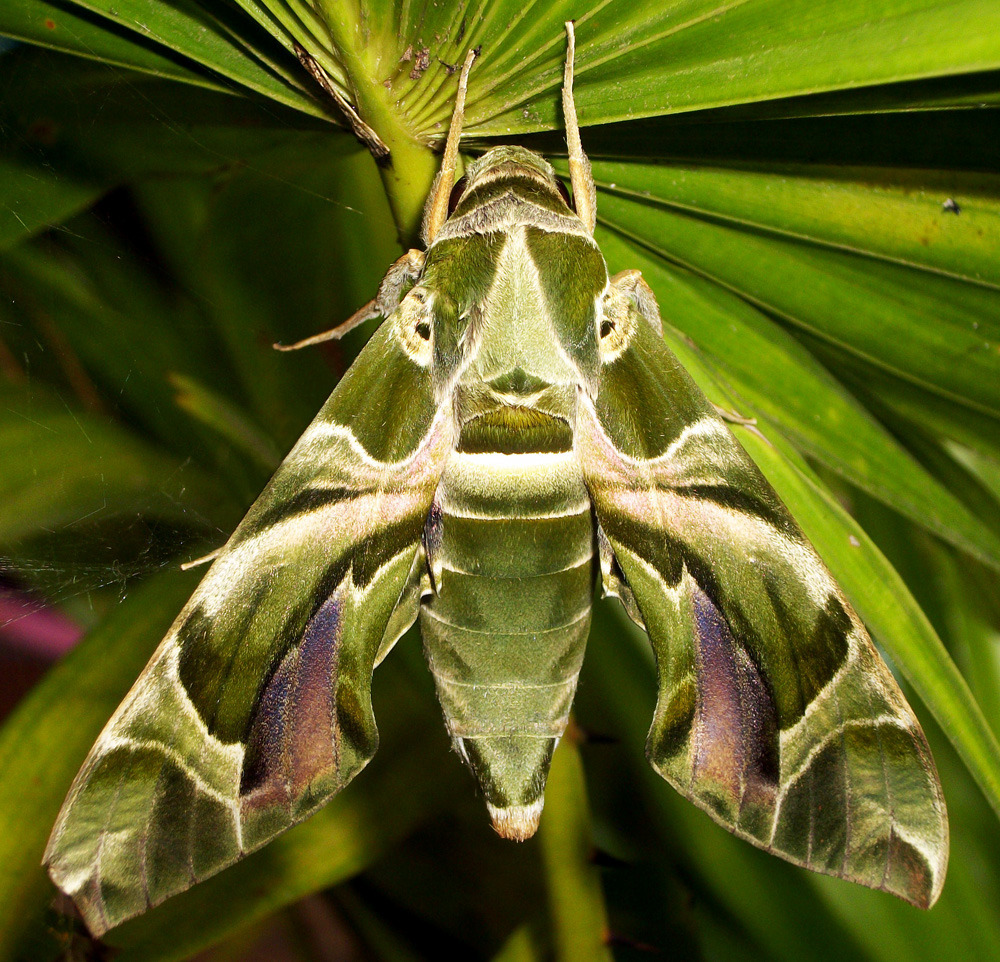
- Female in Mangaon, Maharashtra, India
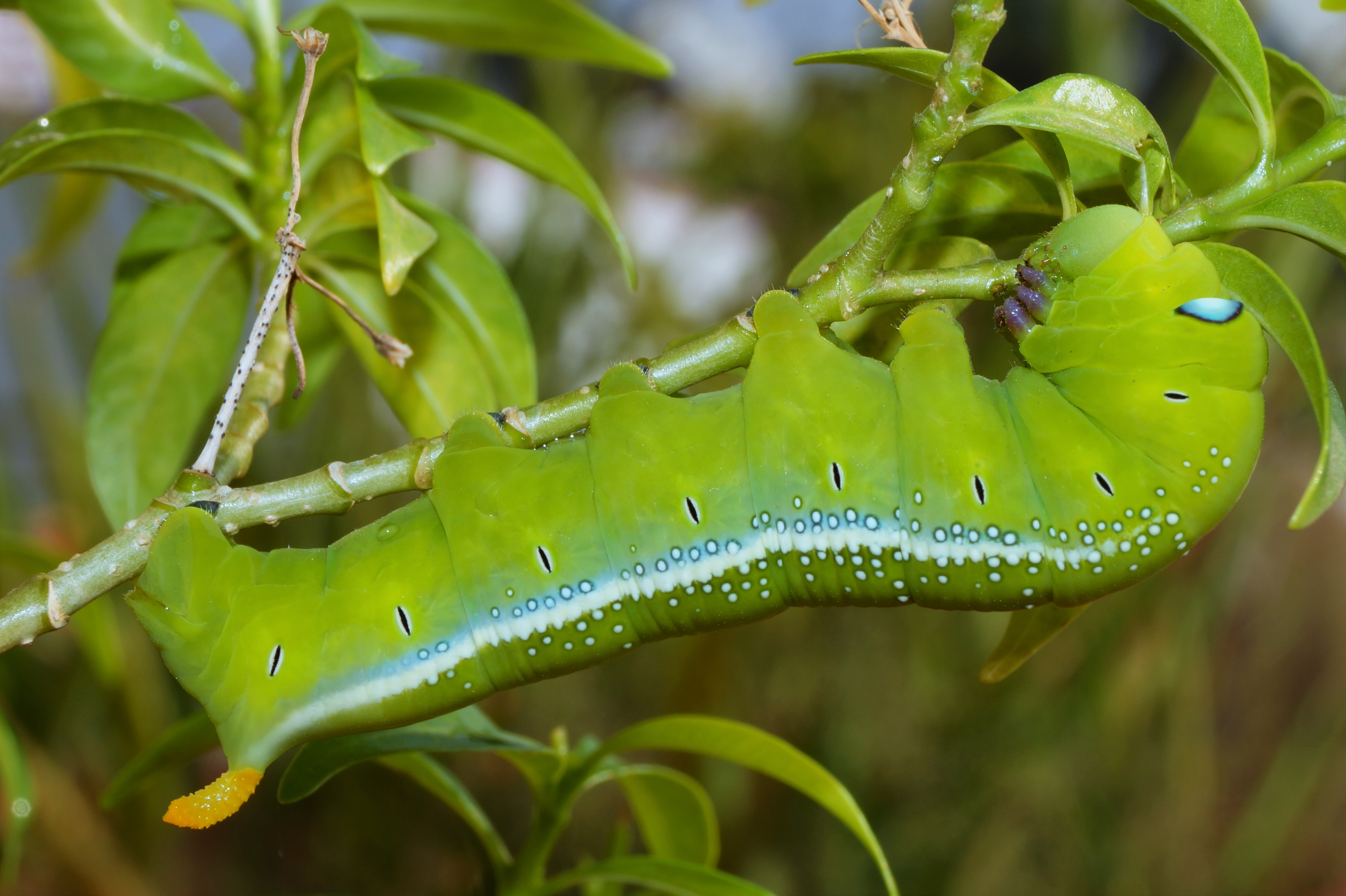
- Fully grown caterpillar

Scientific classification
- Kingdom: Animalia
- Phylum: Arthropoda
- Clade: Pancrustacea
- Class: Insecta
- Order: Lepidoptera
- Family: Sphingidae
- Genus: Daphnis
- Species: D. nerii

Binomial name
- Daphnis nerii (Linnaeus, 1758)
- Distribution: blue = summer, green = year round

Synonyms
- Sphinx nerii Linnaeus, 1758; Daphnis nerii infernelutea Saalmüller, 1884; Daphnis nerii confluens Closs, 1912; Daphnis nerii nigra Schmidt, 1914; Deilephila nerii; Deilephila nerii bipartita Gehlen, 1934

= Daphnis nerii =

Species of moth

Daphnis nerii, the oleander hawk-moth or army green moth, is a moth of the family Sphingidae. It was described by Carl Linnaeus in his 1758 10th edition of Systema Naturae.

== Distribution ==
Daphnis nerii is a large hawk-moth found in wide areas of Africa, Asia and Hawaii. It is a migratory species, flying to parts of eastern and southern Europe during the summer, particularly Turkey, very occasionally reaching western Europe, including England and can even reach to as far north as Scotland or even Finland.

== Feeding habits ==
The adults feed on nectar of a great variety of flowers. They have a preference for fragrant species like petunia, jasmine, periwinkle and honeysuckle. They are especially active in the twilight time, hovering over the flowers after sunset.

The caterpillars feed mainly on oleander (Nerium oleander) leaves, a highly toxic plant, to which the caterpillars are immune. They also may feed on most other plants of the dogbane family, such as Adenium obesum, Tabernaemontana divaricata and Alstonia scholaris in India. They also eat unbloomed flowers of Tabernaemontana divaricata at night. In England, where the species is one of the rarest migrant hawk-moths, a larva was discovered in 1885 by a milkman in Castle Street, Portchester, feeding on periwinkle Vinca minor.

== Biology ==
The adult has a greenish head, with rufous in front and a grey band on the vertex. The thorax is green, and the collar outlined in grey. There is a triangular grey patch on the vertex. Abdomen is pale greenish with oblique lines at the side paired dark green lateral blotches on the penultimate segment and a single dorsal blotch on the ultimate segment. Forewings are dark green and a white patch with a black spot on it at base. Some medial whitish conjoined bands, rosy towards the hind margin. There is a triangular purplish patch from below the cell to near outer margin. Hindwings are fuscous with a pale curved submarginal line, beyond which the area is olivaceus. Ventral side is suffused with chestnut colour and a white submarginal line on both wings. A white speck is present at the end of the hindwing.

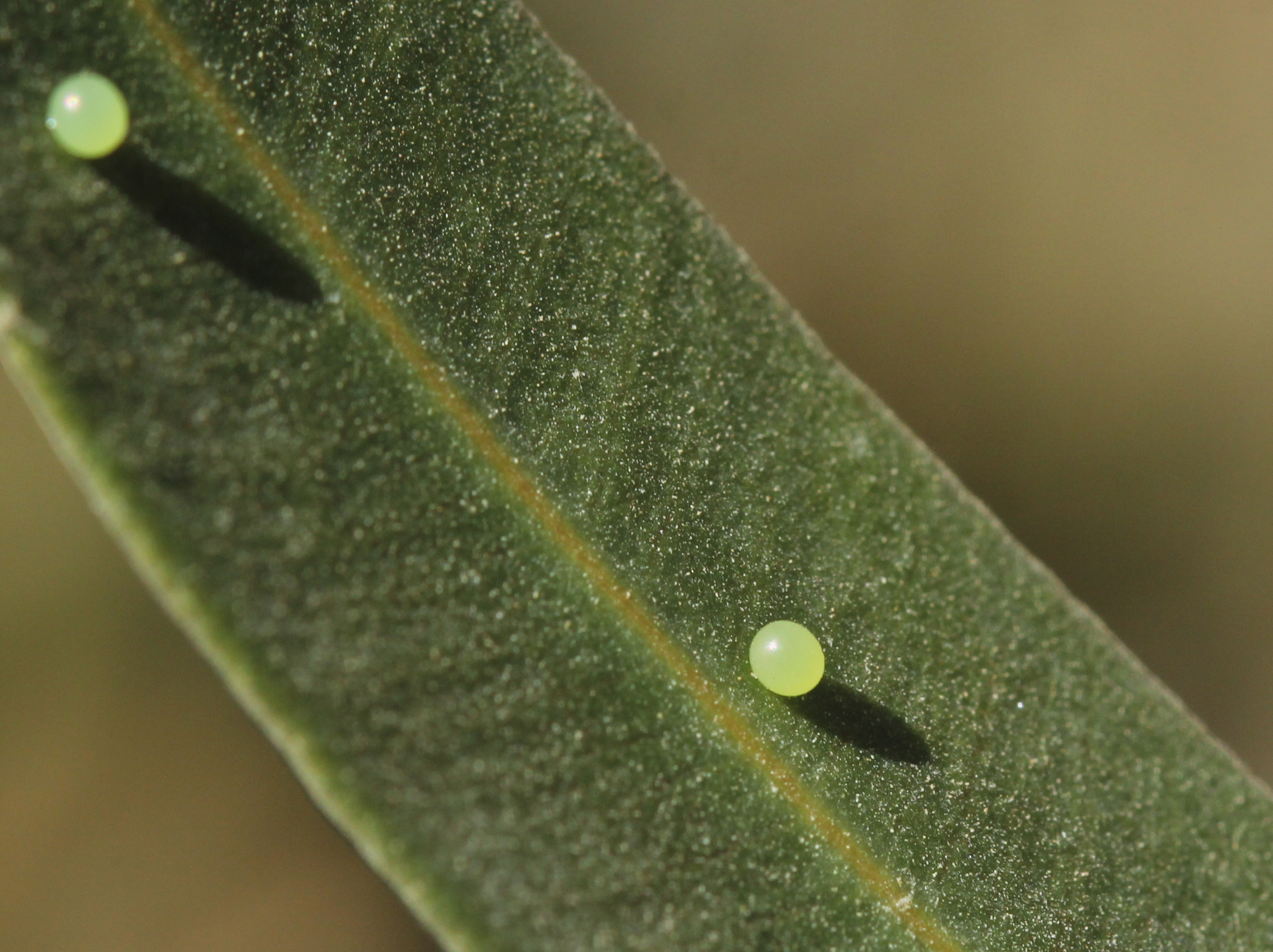
Eggs of oleander hawk moth in United Arab Emirates

Newly hatched oleander hawk-moth larvae are three to four millimeters in length, bright yellow, and have a black, elongated "horn" on the rear of the body. As they get older, the larvae become green to brown with a large blue-and-white eyespot near the head and a yellow "horn" on the rear. There is also a white band along the side of the body, with a scattering of small white and bluish dots alongside it. The spiracles on the sides of the body are black. Older oleander hawk-moth larvae measure around 7.5 to 8.5 centimetres in length.

Just before it pupates, the oleander hawk-moth larva becomes browner in colour. The pupa of this species measures around 5.5 to 7.5 centimetres in length, and is light brown with black spots and a black line down the middle. The pupa is pale reddish or brownish white and has a wax-like appearance. It lies directly on the earth, under moss or dry leaves.

Gallery

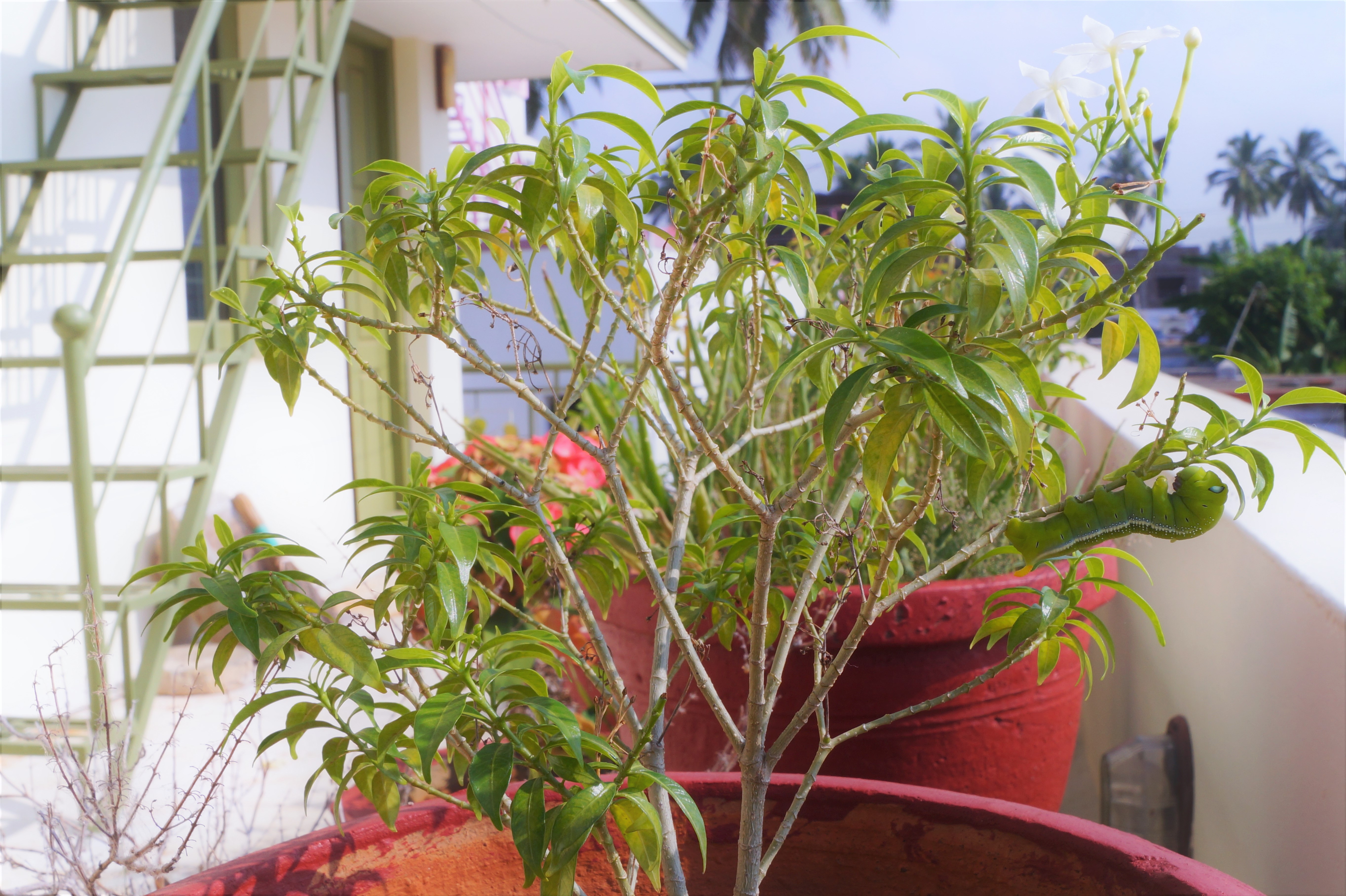
Caterpillar feeding on a pinwheel flower plant at Udumalpet, Tamil Nadu, India

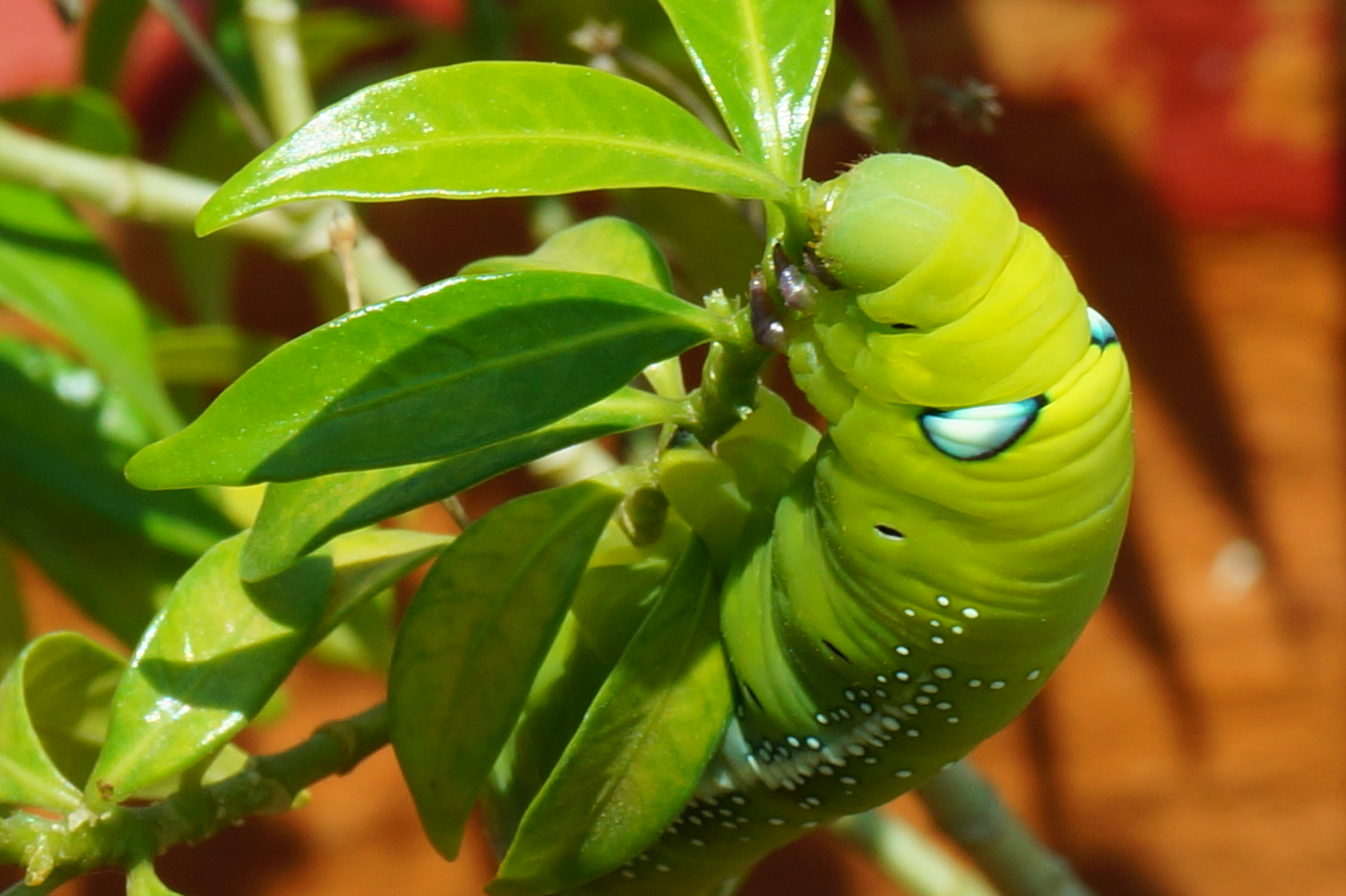
Oleander hawk moth caterpillar eating

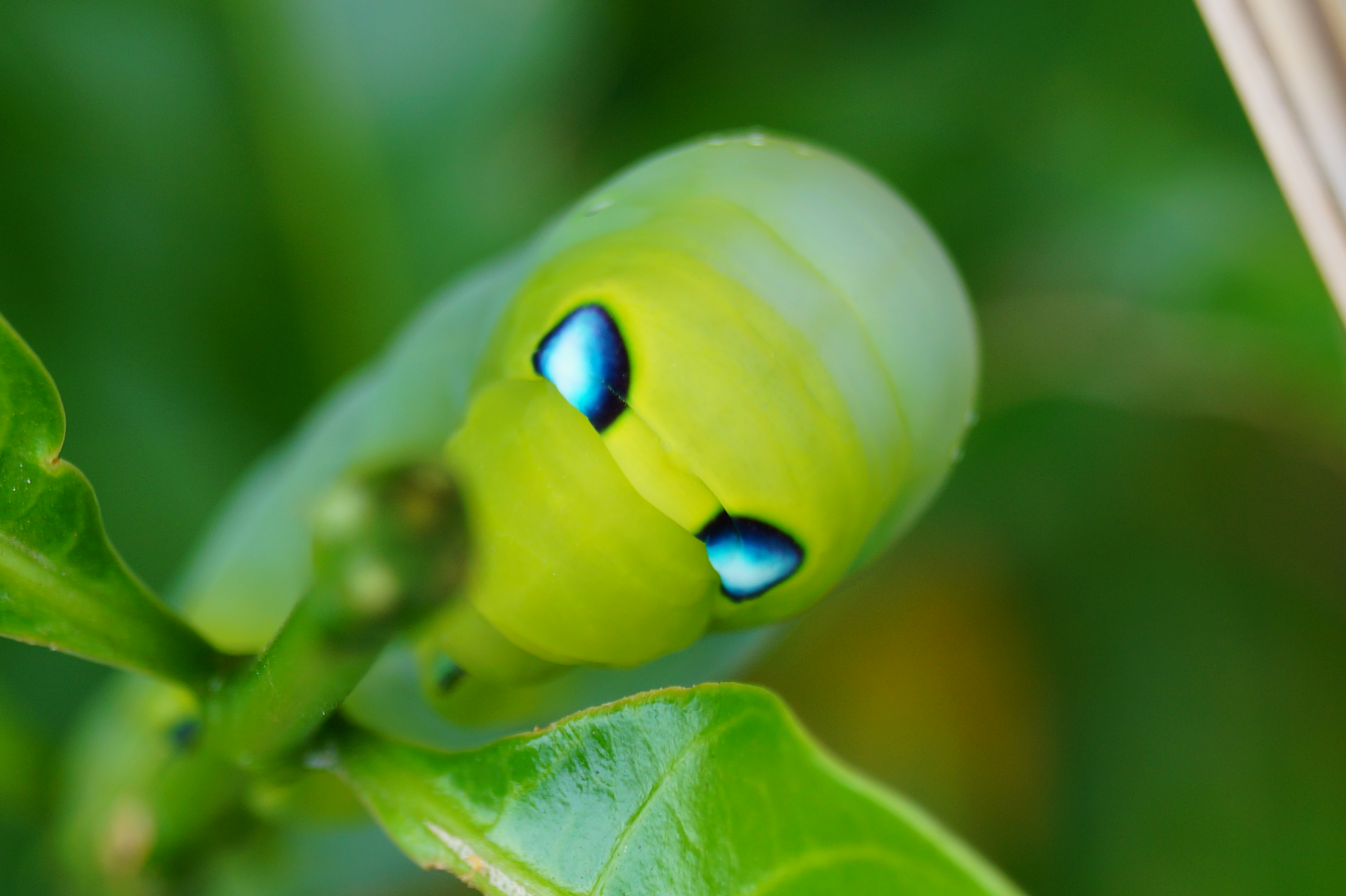
The eye spots probably reduce predation.

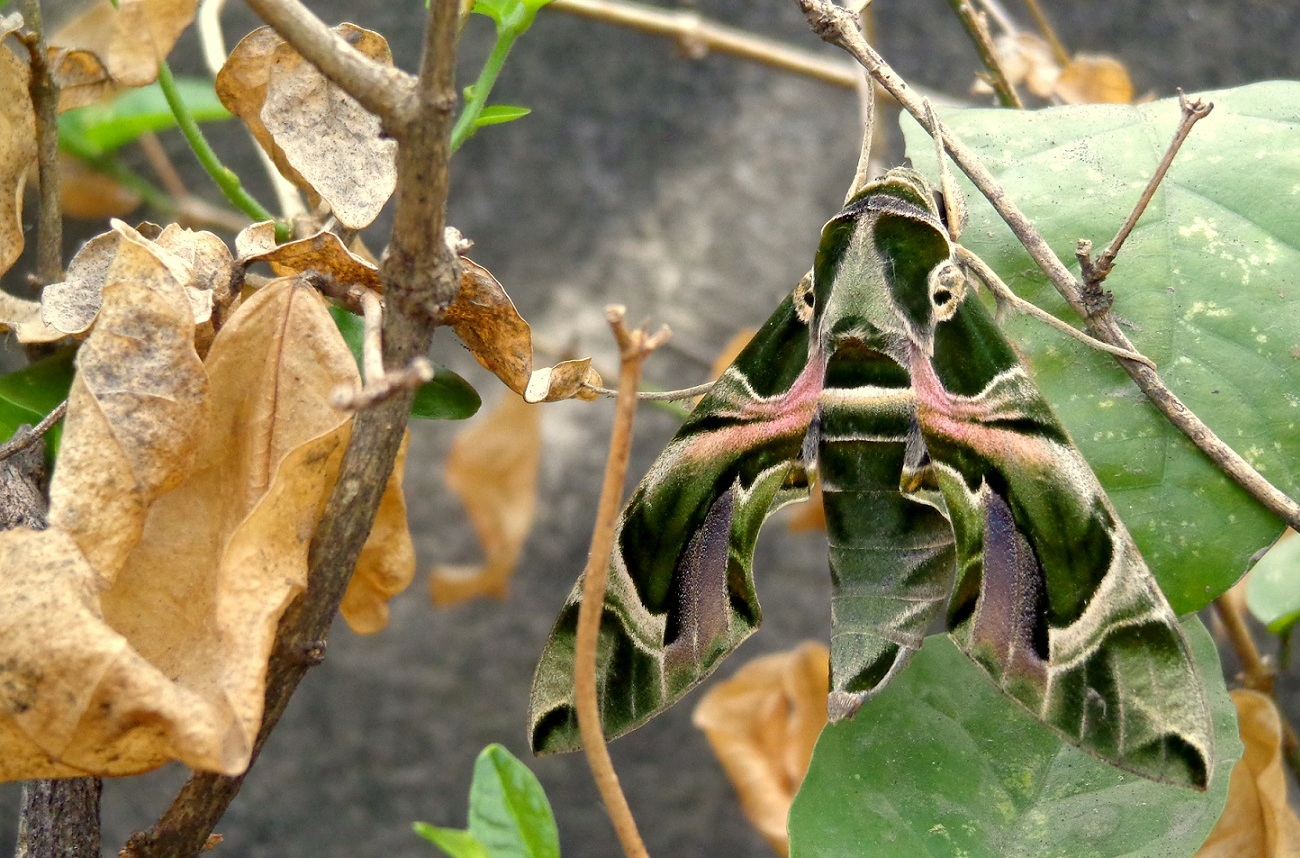
Near Kolkata, India

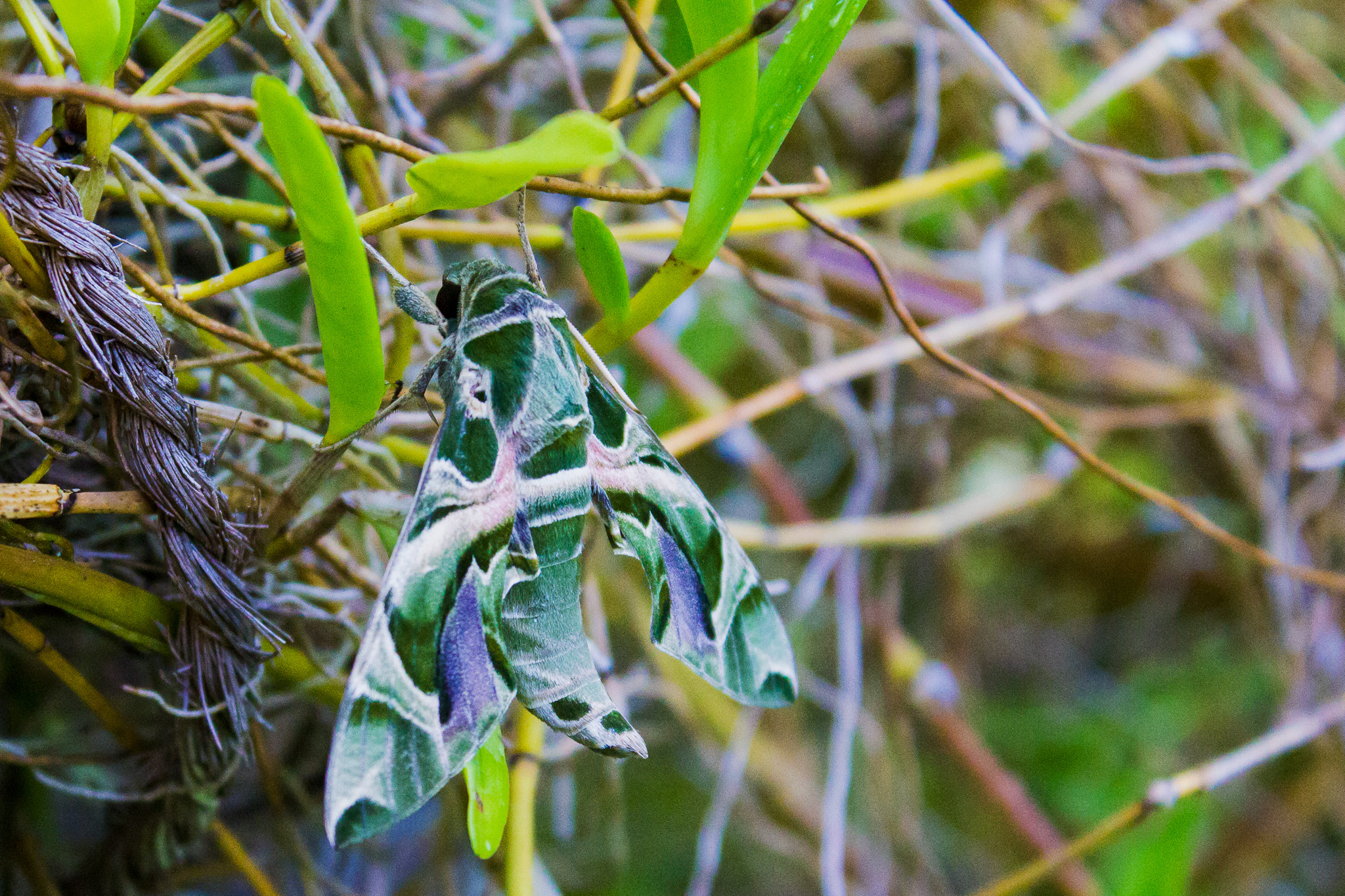
Sri Lanka

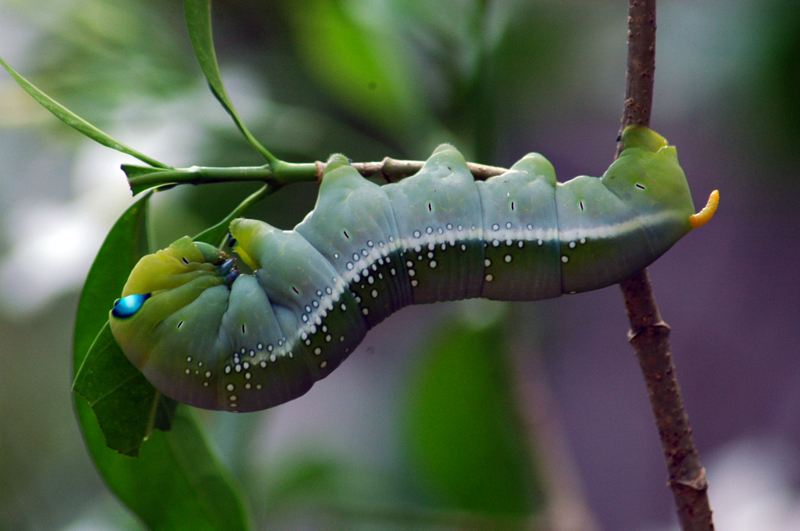
Caterpillar

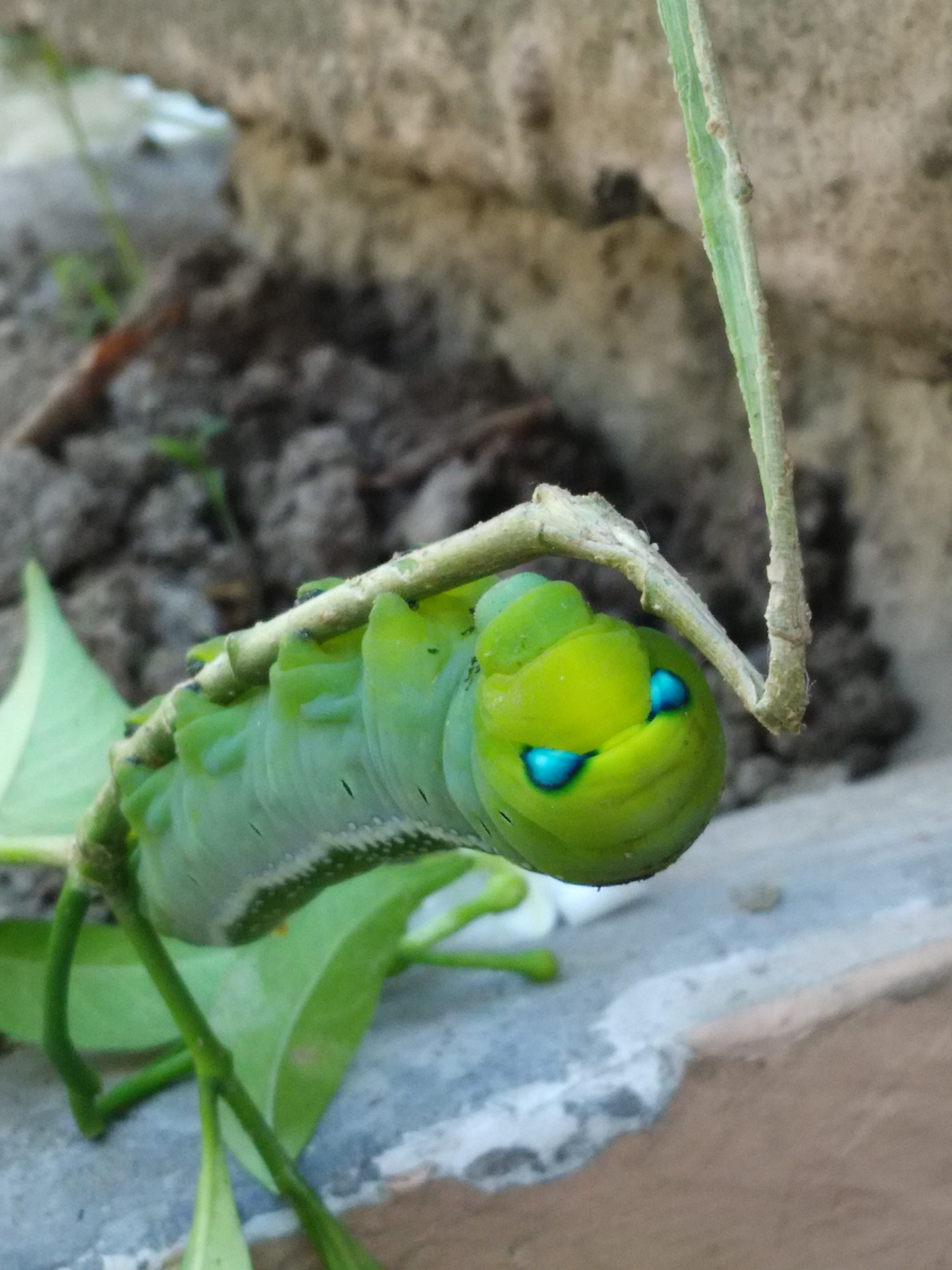
Caterpillar at Behala, Kolkata

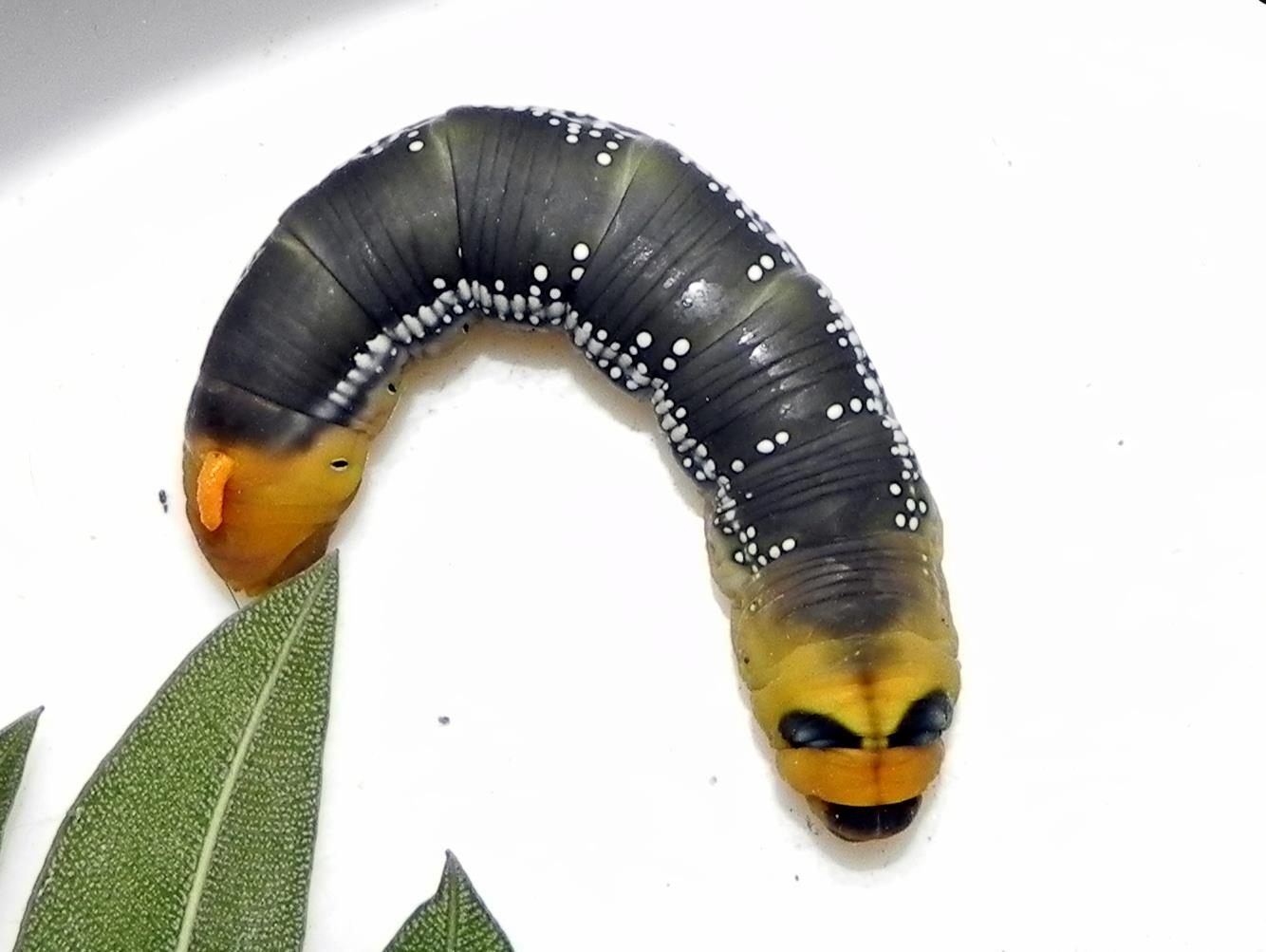
Caterpillar just before pupating

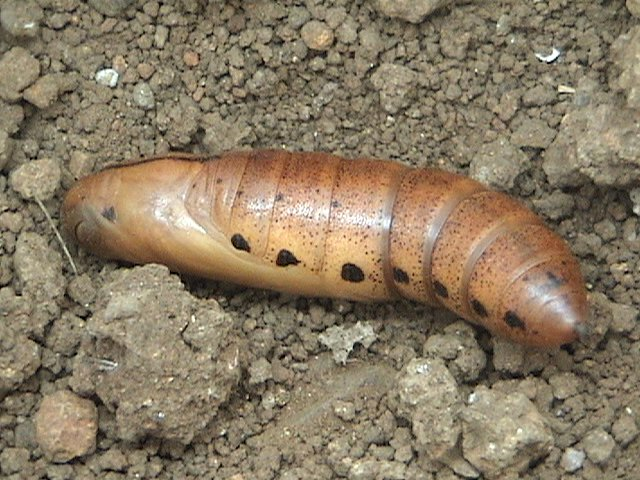
Pupa

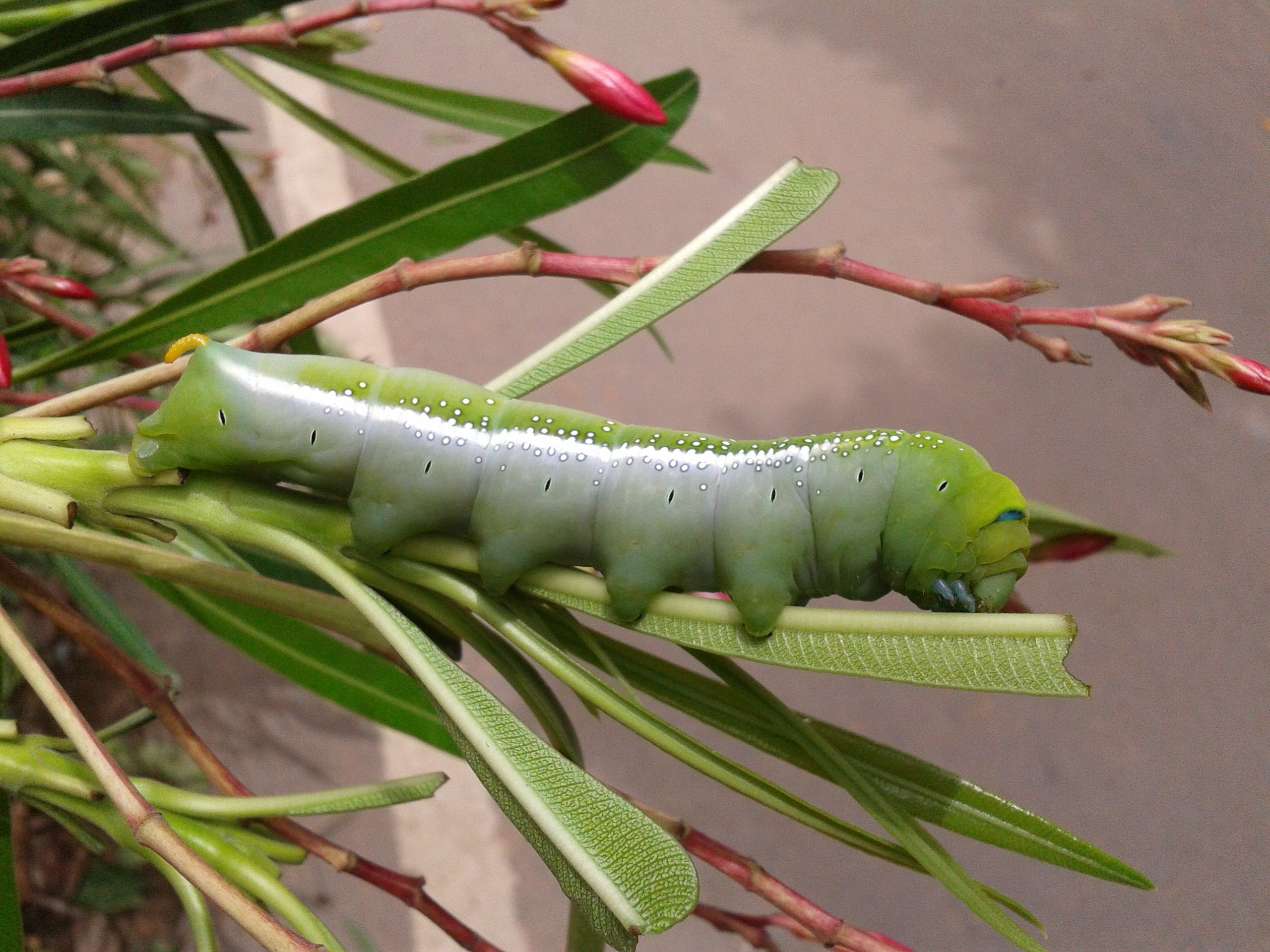
Caterpillar
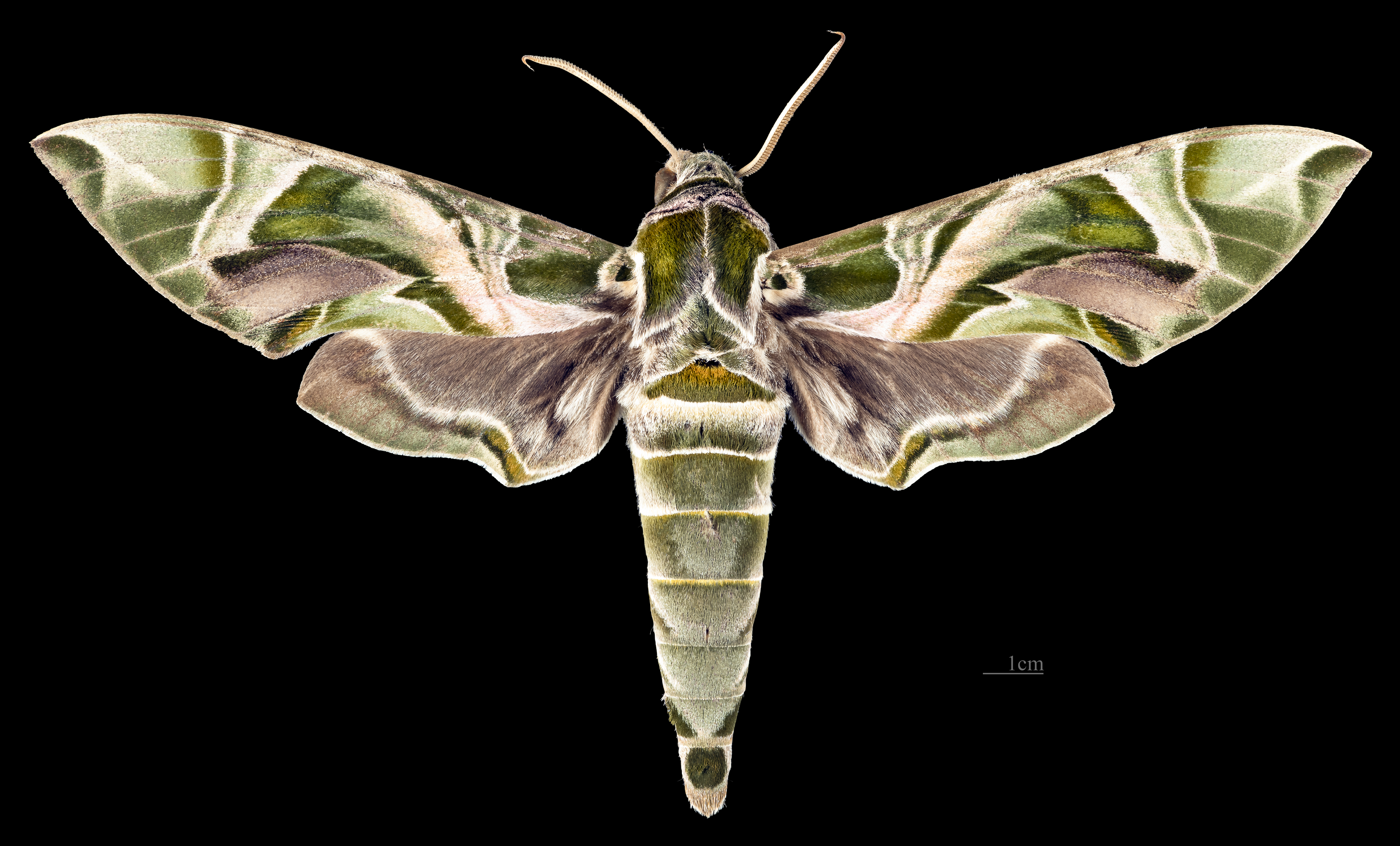
Male dorsal view

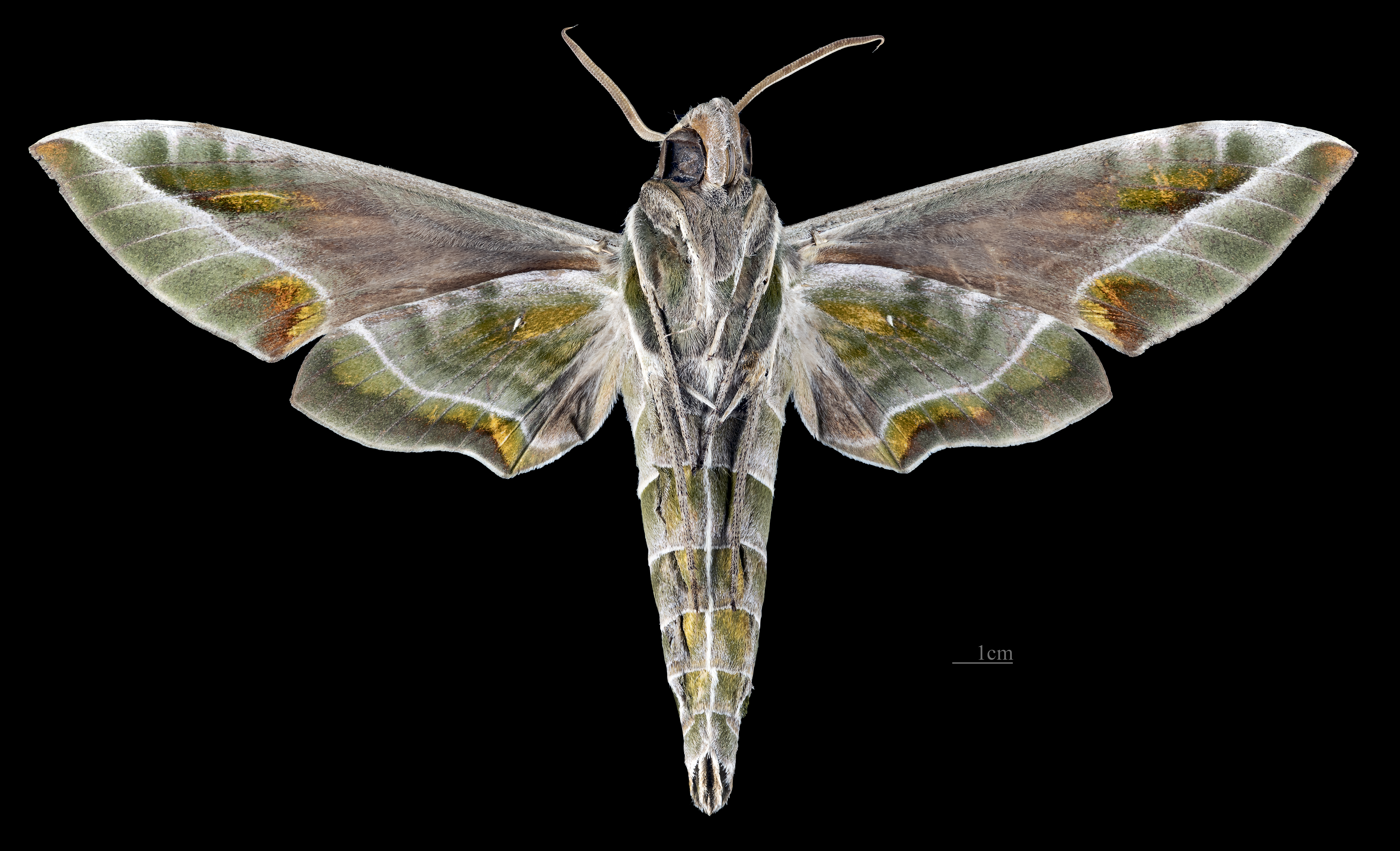
Male ventral view

== Related species ==
- Daphnis hypothous, found in South and Southeast Asia. Distinguished by a white spot at the forewing apex.
