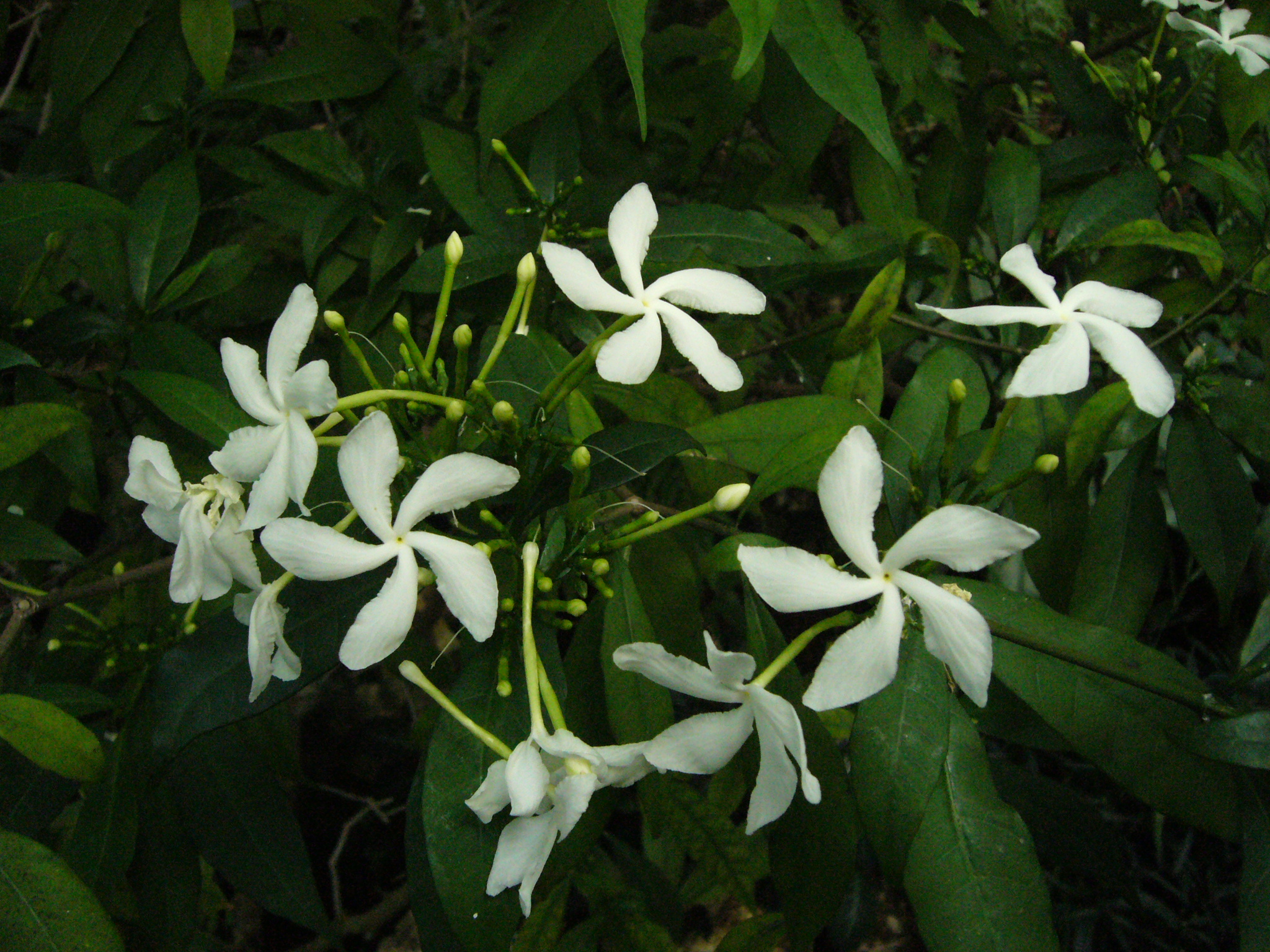

Conservation status
- Least Concern (IUCN 3.1)

Scientific classification
- Kingdom: Plantae
- Clade: Embryophytes
- Clade: Tracheophytes
- Clade: Spermatophytes
- Clade: Angiosperms
- Clade: Eudicots
- Clade: Asterids
- Order: Gentianales
- Family: Apocynaceae
- Genus: Tabernaemontana
- Species: T. corymbosa

Binomial name
- Tabernaemontana corymbosa Roxb. ex Wall.

Synonyms
- List: Ervatamia corymbosa (Roxb. ex Wall.) King & Gamble; Pagiantha corymbosa (Roxb. ex Wall.) Markgr.; Ervatamia baviensis (Pit.) Pichon; Ervatamia chinensis (Merr.) Tsiang; Ervatamia continentalis Tsiang; Ervatamia hirta (Hook.f.) King & Gamble; Ervatamia inaequalifolia (Lütjeh. & Ooststr.) Pichon; Ervatamia jasminiflora Ridl.; Ervatamia kwangsiensis Tsiang; Ervatamia kweichowensis Tsiang; Ervatamia laotica (Pit.) Pichon; Ervatamia longopedicellata Lý; Ervatamia pauciflora Ridl.; Ervatamia phuongii Lý; Ervatamia tenuiflora Tsiang; Ervatamia yunnanensis Tsiang; Pagiantha peninsularis Kerr; Tabernaemontana baviensis Pit.; Tabernaemontana carinata Lütjeh. & Ooststr.; Tabernaemontana chinensis Merr.; Tabernaemontana continentalis (Tsiang) P.T.Li; Tabernaemontana cymulosa Miq.; Tabernaemontana hirta Hook.f.; Tabernaemontana inaequalifolia Lütjeh. & Ooststr.; Tabernaemontana kwangsiensis (Tsiang) P.T.Li; Tabernaemontana kweichowensis (Tsiang) P.T.Li; Tabernaemontana laotica Pit.; Tabernaemontana peninsularis (Kerr) P.T.Li; Tabernaemontana pubituba Merr.; Tabernaemontana sumatrana (Miq.) Hallier f.; Tabernaemontana tsiangiana P.T.Li; Tabernaemontana yunnanensis (Tsiang) P.T.Li; Pseudixora sumatrana Miq.; Randia sumatrana (Miq.) Miq.

= Tabernaemontana corymbosa =

Species of plant

Tabernaemontana corymbosa is a species of plant in the family Apocynaceae. It is native to Brunei, China, Indonesia, Laos, Malaysia, Myanmar, Singapore, Thailand, and Vietnam. Glossy green leaves and faintly sweet scented flower. Flowers continuously all year. Frost tolerant. Grows to about 2 metres. Likes full sun to part shade. A number of cultivars are available.

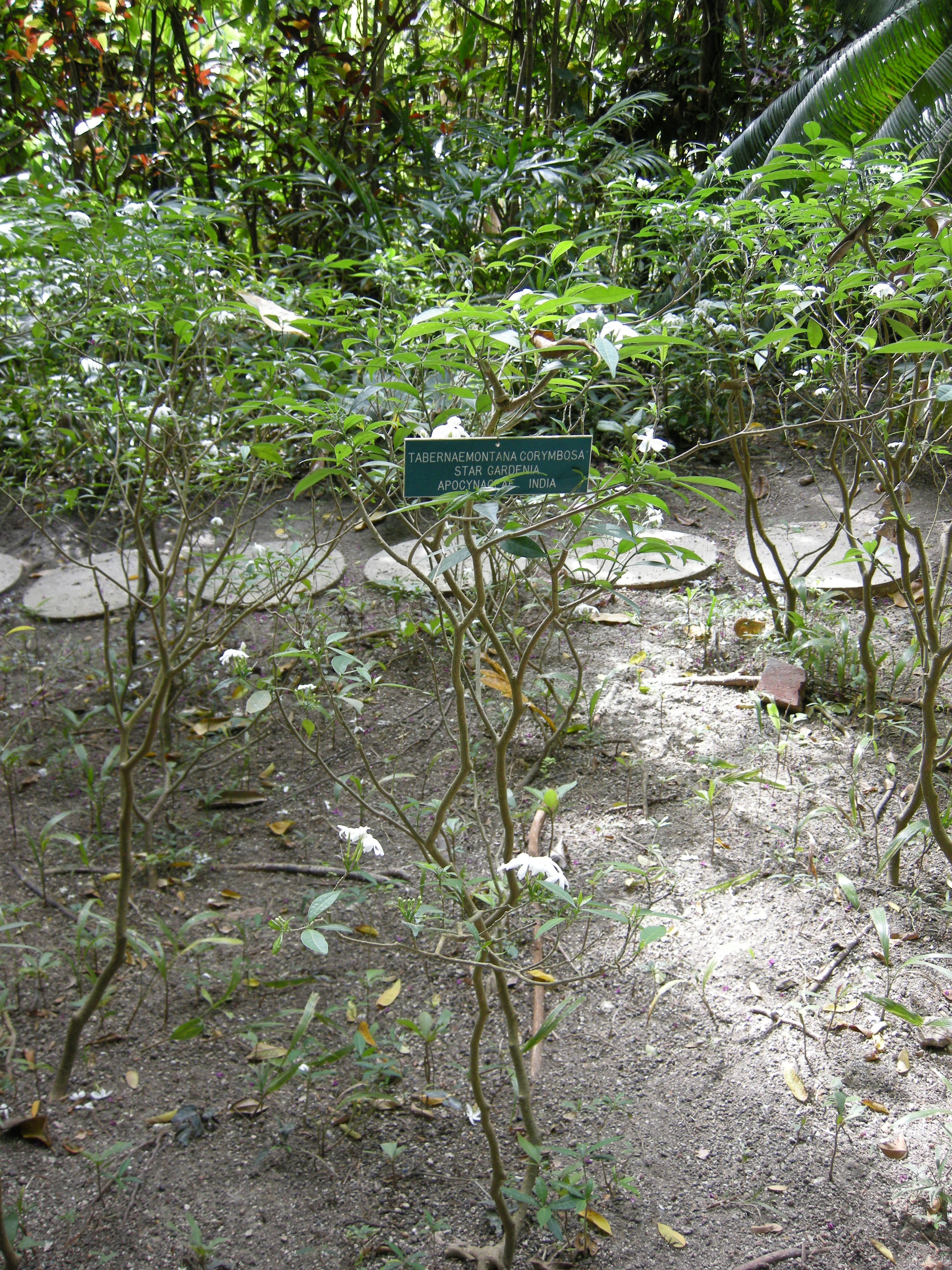

== Chemical composition ==
Multiple compounds of different classes such as Iboga alkaloids and Bisindole alkaloids have been isolated from this plant. Alkaloids such as conodusine A-E, conolodinines A-D, conophylline, conophyllinine and taberyunines A-I are present in which many shows antiproliferative and cytotoxic actions. Thirteen indole alkaloids have been isolated from Tabernaemontana corymbosa, including six vobazines/sarpagines, one vincamine, two voaphyllines-type (including conoflorine and voaphylline), two tacaman-type alkaloids, one iboga-type alkaloid, and one corynantheine alkaloid. Specific antibacterial monoterpenoid indole alkaloids such as tabernaecorymines A-E were identified from the plant. Among the more structurally complex compounds, vobasinyl-iboga bisindole alkaloids were isolated and studied for their anticancer activity. Ten alkaloids were isolated, including tabercorines A–C and a new natural product, 17-acetyl-tabernaecorymbosine A. Tabernaricatin A, tabernaricatin B, tabernaricatin D, 16-decarbomethoxyvoacamine, conodurine, and tabernaecorymbosine B were identified.
