= Rhazine =

Names
- Systematic IUPAC name Methyl (19Z)-17-hydroxy-2,7-dihydrosarpagan-16-carboxylate

Identifiers
| CAS Number | 639-36-1 |
| 3D model (JSmol) | Interactive image |
| ChemSpider | 4911195 |
| PubChem CID | 6398565 |
| UNII | R0Q989C5D1 |
| CompTox Dashboard (EPA) | DTXSID301045529 |
- InChI: InChI=1S/C21H26N2O3/c1-3-12-10-23-17-9-15(12)21(11-24,20(25)26-2)18(23)8-14-13-6-4-5-7-16(13)22-19(14)17/h3-7,14-15,17-19,22,24H,8-11H2,1-2H3/b12-3+/t14?,15-,17-,18-,19?,21?/m0/s1 Key: OFQWNEQERHWDMW-MHZKAKLGSA-N
- SMILES: C/C=C/1\CN2[C@H]3C[C@@H]1C([C@@H]2CC4C3Nc5c4cccc5)(CO)C(=O)OC

Properties
| Chemical formula | C_{21}H_{26}N_{2}O_{3} |
| Molar mass | 354.450 g·mol^{−1} |
- Except where otherwise noted, data are given for materials in their standard state (at 25 °C [77 °F], 100 kPa). Infobox references

Rhazine is an alkaloid isolated from Alstonia boonei, a tree of West Africa.
