= Voacristine =

Chemical compound

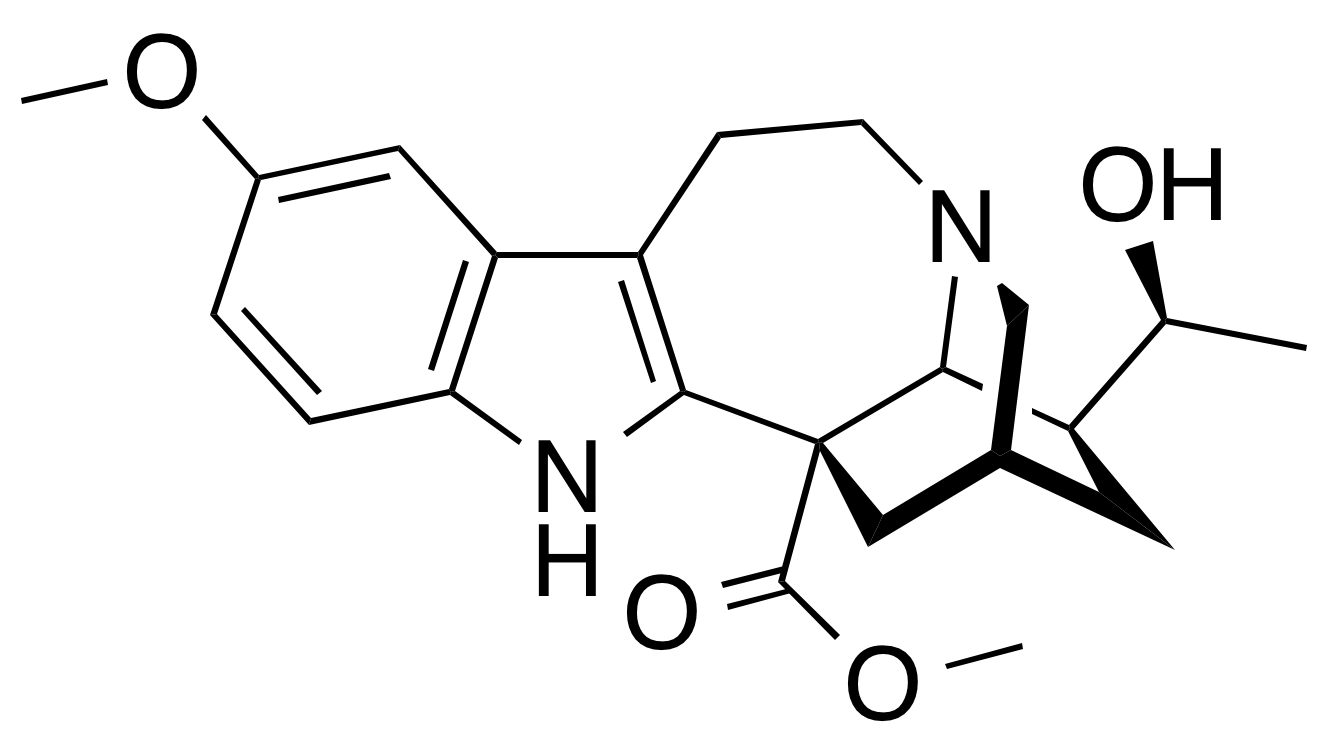

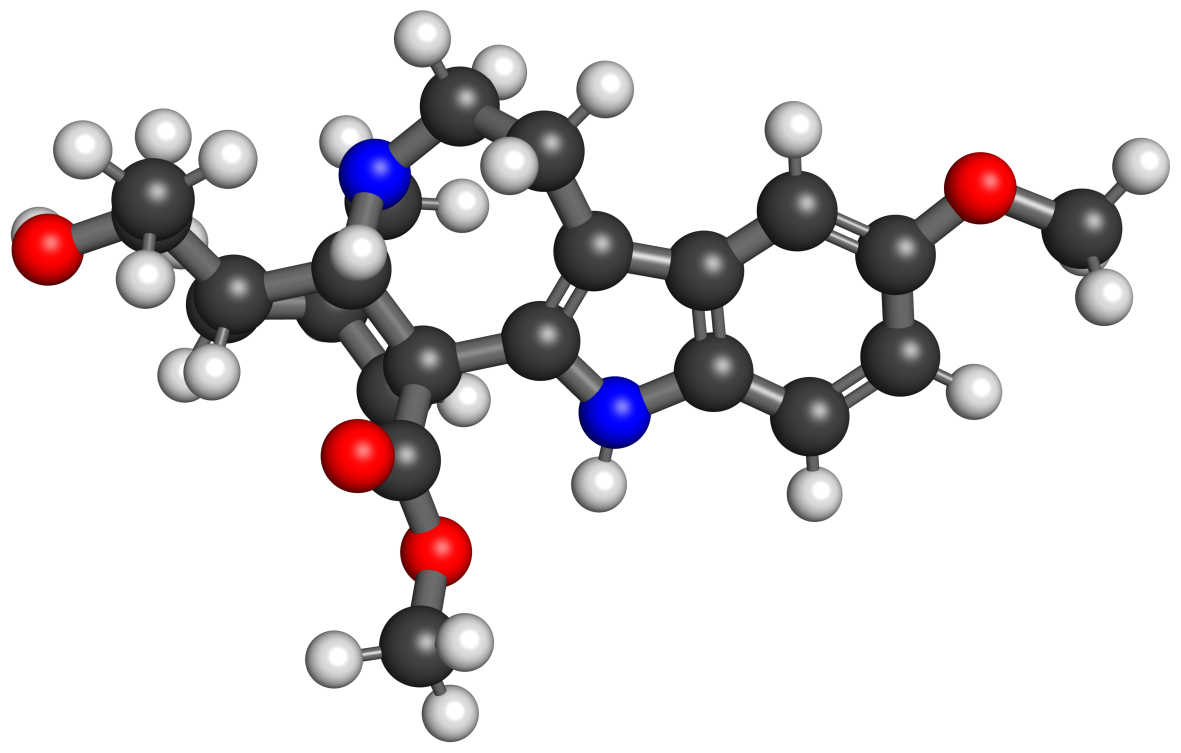

Clinical data
- Other names: 19(S)-Heyneanine

Identifiers
- IUPAC name: methyl (1S,15R,17S,18S)-17-[(1S)-1-hydroxyethyl]-7-methoxy-3,13-diazapentacyclo[13.3.1.0^{2,10}.0^{4,9}.0^{13,18}]nonadeca-2(10),4(9),5,7-tetraene-1-carboxylate
- CAS Number: 545-84-6
- PubChem CID: 196982
- ChemSpider: 170602
- ChEMBL: ChEMBL463317
- CompTox Dashboard (EPA): DTXSID40969687

Chemical and physical data
- Formula: C_{22}H_{28}N_{2}O_{4}
- Molar mass: 384.476 g·mol^{−1}
- 3D model (JSmol): Interactive image
- SMILES: C[C@@H]([C@H]1C[C@@H]2C[C@@]3([C@H]1N(C2)CCC4=C3NC5=C4C=C(C=C5)OC)C(=O)OC)O
- InChI: InChI=1S/C22H28N2O4/c1-12(25)16-8-13-10-22(21(26)28-3)19-15(6-7-24(11-13)20(16)22)17-9-14(27-2)4-5-18(17)23-19/h4-5,9,12-13,16,20,23,25H,6-8,10-11H2,1-3H3/t12-,13+,16+,20-,22+/m0/s1; Key:OYMQKBZMKFJPMH-VJMPXSKLSA-N

Voacristine is a indole alkaloid occurring in Voacanga and Tabernaemontana genus. It is also an iboga type alkaloid.

== Chemistry ==
Its structure is almost similar to voacangine, an alkaloid used in semi-synthesis of ibogaine. Compared to voacangine, it has an extra O-atom. When it is degraded, iboxygaine and ibogaine are formed.

== Sources ==
Voacristine is found in multiple species of Tabernaemontana including Tabernaemontana divaricata, Tabernaemontana heyneana, Tabernaemontana ventricosa, and Voacanga africana.

== See also ==
- Heyneanine
- Voacamine
- Vobasine
