= Conodurine =

Names
- IUPAC name methyl 17-ethyl-5-[(15Z)-15-ethylidene-18-methoxycarbonyl-17-methyl-10,17-diazatetracyclo[12.3.1.03,11.04,9]octadeca-3(11),4,6,8-tetraen-12-yl]-6-methoxy-3,13-diazapentacyclo[13.3.1.02,10.04,9.013,18]nonadeca-2(10),4(9),5,7-tetraene-1-carboxylate

Identifiers
CAS Number	2665-57-8
3D model (JSmol)	Interactive image
ChemSpider	57260028
PubChem CID	5477056
UNII	GEA6LKA5NH
CompTox Dashboard (EPA)	DTXSID50420416
- InChI: InChI=1S/C43H52N4O5/c1-7-24-17-23-20-43(42(49)52-6)39-28(15-16-47(21-23)40(24)43)27-13-14-34(50-4)36(38(27)45-39)31-18-29-25(8-2)22-46(3)33(35(29)41(48)51-5)19-30-26-11-9-10-12-32(26)44-37(30)31/h8-14,23-24,29,31,33,35,40,44-45H,7,15-22H2,1-6H3/b25-8+ Key: QJHYXWBJZHUJGS-ZNLRHDTNSA-N
- SMILES: CCC1CC2CC3(C1N(C2)CCC4=C3NC5=C4C=CC(=C5C6CC7C(C(CC8=C6NC9=CC=CC=C89)N(CC7=CC)C)C(=O)OC)OC)C(=O)OC

Properties
Chemical formula	C_{43}H_{52}N_{4}O_{5}
Molar mass	704.912 g·mol^{−1}
- Except where otherwise noted, data are given for materials in their standard state (at 25 °C [77 °F], 100 kPa). Infobox references

Conodurine is an acetylcholinesterase inhibitor and butyrylcholinesterase inhibitor isolated from Tabernaemontana.

== See also ==
- Conolidine
- Confoline
