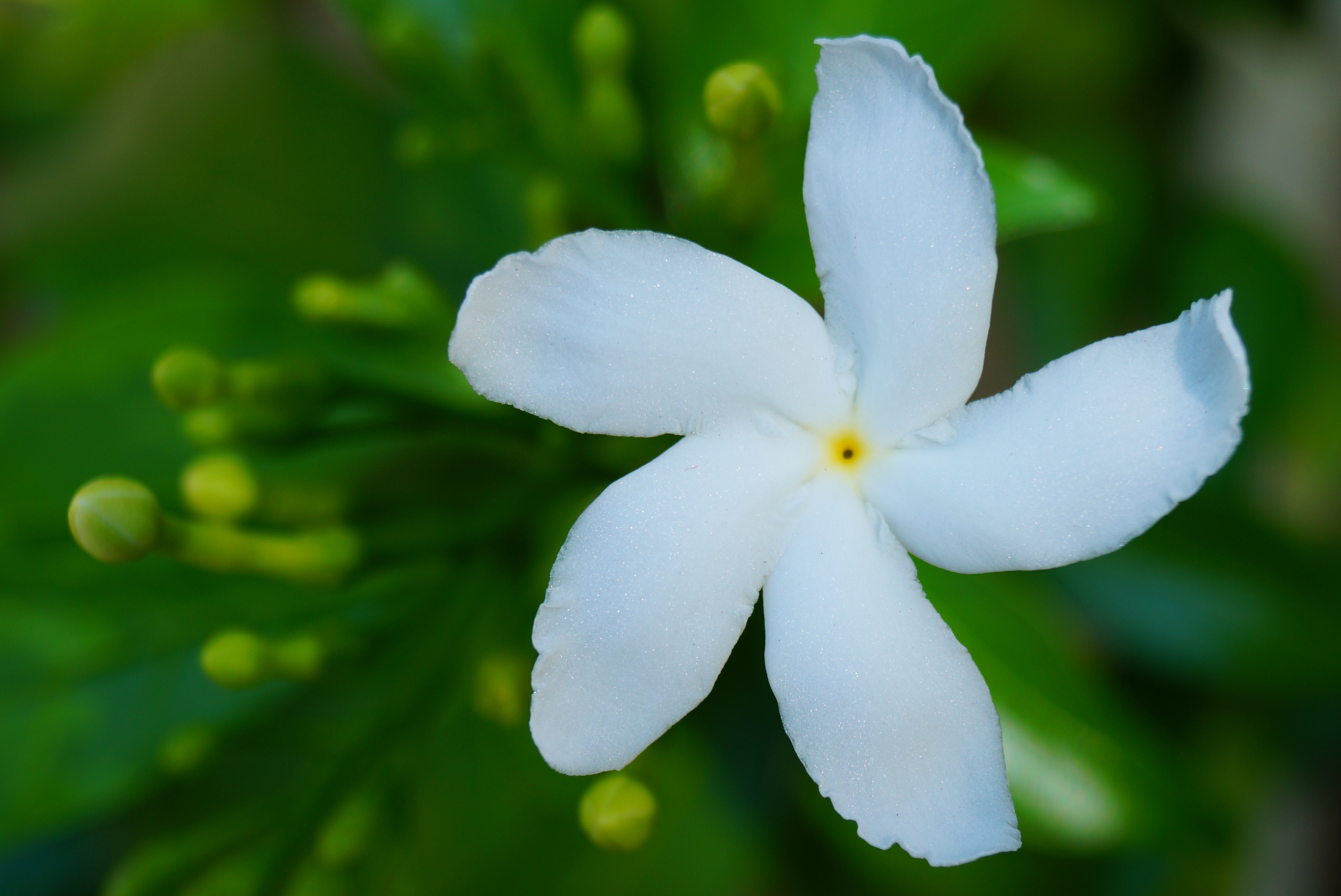

Conservation status
- Least Concern (IUCN 3.1)

Scientific classification
- Kingdom: Plantae
- Clade: Tracheophytes
- Clade: Angiosperms
- Clade: Eudicots
- Clade: Asterids
- Order: Gentianales
- Family: Apocynaceae
- Genus: Tabernaemontana
- Species: T. divaricata

Binomial name
- Tabernaemontana divaricata (L.) R.Br. ex Roem. & Schult.

Synonyms
- List: Ervatamia coronaria (Jacq.) Stapf; Ervatamia divaricata (L.) Burkill; Ervatamia divaricata var. plena (Roxb. ex Voigt) M.R.Almeida; Ervatamia flabelliformis Tsiang; Ervatamia recurva (Lindl.) Lace; Ervatamia siamensis (Warb. ex Pit.) Kerr; Kopsia cochinchinensis Kuntze; Nerium coronarium Jacq.; Nerium divaricatum L.; Reichardia grandiflora Dennst.; Reichardia jasminoides Dennst.; Taberna discolor (Sw.) Miers; Tabernaemontana citrifolia Lunan; Tabernaemontana coronaria (Jacq.) Willd.; Tabernaemontana discolor Sw.; Tabernaemontana flabelliformis (Tsiang) P.T.Li; Tabernaemontana gratissima Lindl.; Tabernaemontana lurida Van Heurck & Müll.Arg.; Tabernaemontana recurva Lindl.; Tabernaemontana siamensis Warb. ex Pit.; Testudipes recurva (Lindl.) Markgr.; Vinca alba Noronha; Jasminum zeylanicum Burm.f.; Nyctanthes acuminata Burm.f.

= Tabernaemontana divaricata =

Species of plant

Tabernaemontana divaricata, commonly called pinwheel flower, crape jasmine, Ceylon jasmine, East India rosebay, and Nero's crown, is an evergreen shrub or small tree native to South Asia, Southeast Asia and China. In zones where it is not hardy it is grown as a house/glasshouse plant for its attractive flowers and foliage. The stem exudes a milky latex when broken, whence comes the name milk flower.

== Description ==
The plant generally grows to a height of 1.5–1.8 metres (5–6 ft) and is dichotomously branched. The large shiny leaves are deep green and about 15 cm (6 in) in length and 5 cm (2 in) in width. The waxy blossoms are found in small clusters on the stem tips. The (single) flowers have the characteristic 'pinwheel' shape also seen in other genera in the family Apocynaceae such as Vinca and Nerium. Both single and double-flowered forms are cultivated, the flowers of both forms being white. The plant blooms in spring but flowers appear sporadically all year. The flowers have a pleasing fragrance. More than 66 alkaloids are found in the shrub. Its habitats include montane brushwoods and sparse forests.

== Phytochemistry ==
The species is known to produce many alkaloids including catharanthine, conolidine, coronaridine, dregamine, ibogamine, tabersonine, voacangine, voacamine and voacristine. Ibogaine may occur in multiple Tabernaemontana species.

== Gallery ==
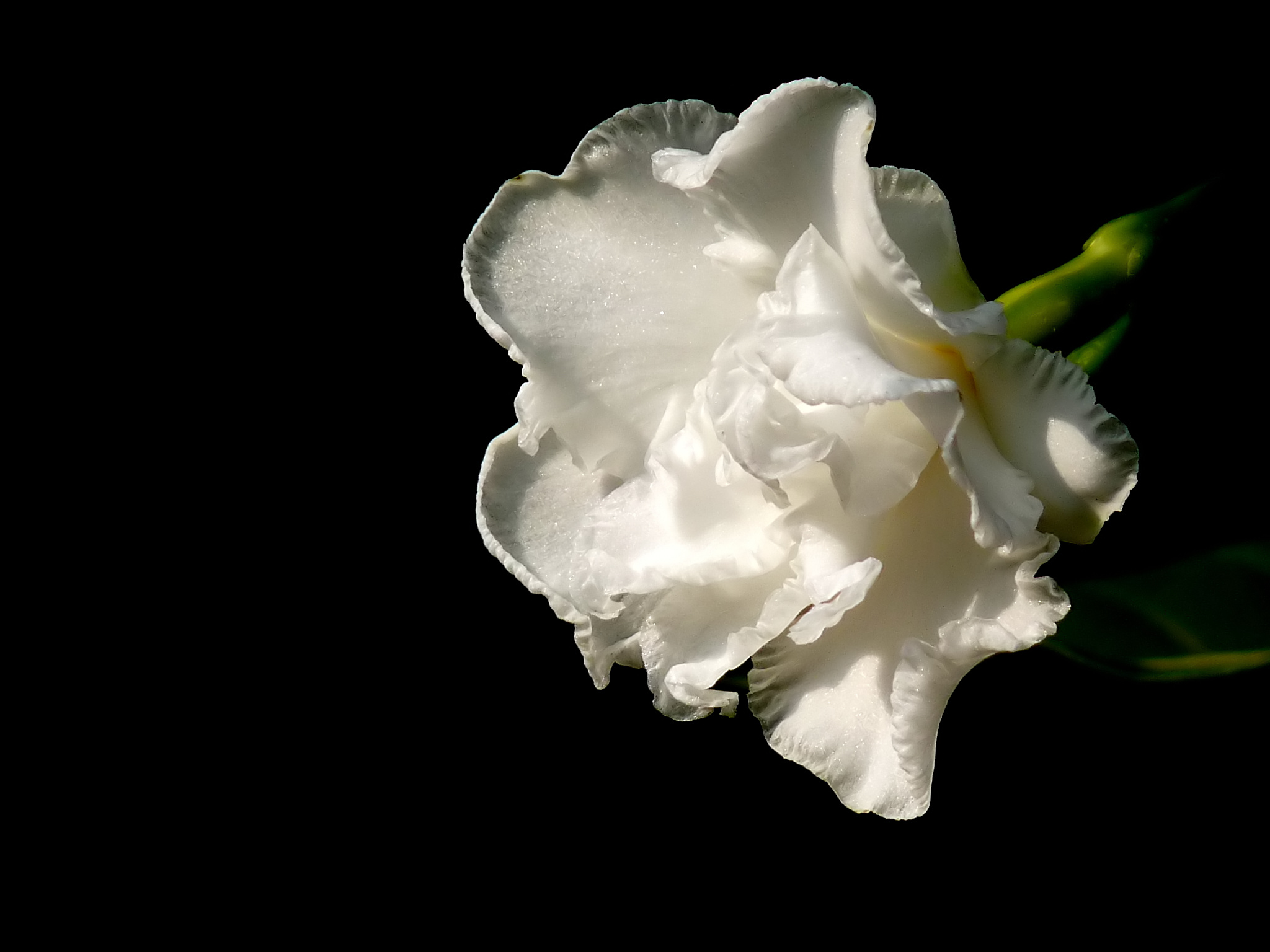
'Flore Pleno' variety

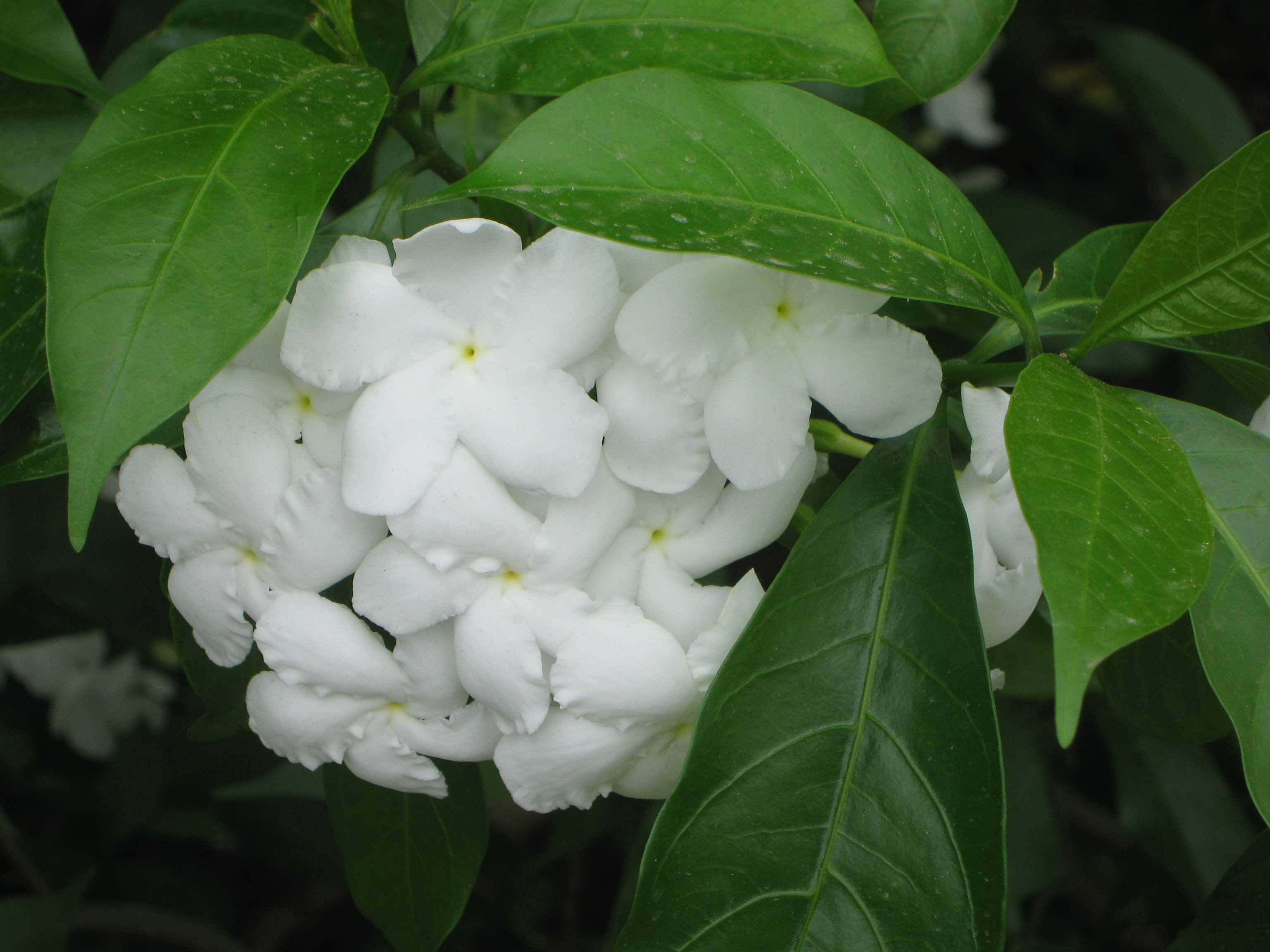
Crape jasmine bunch

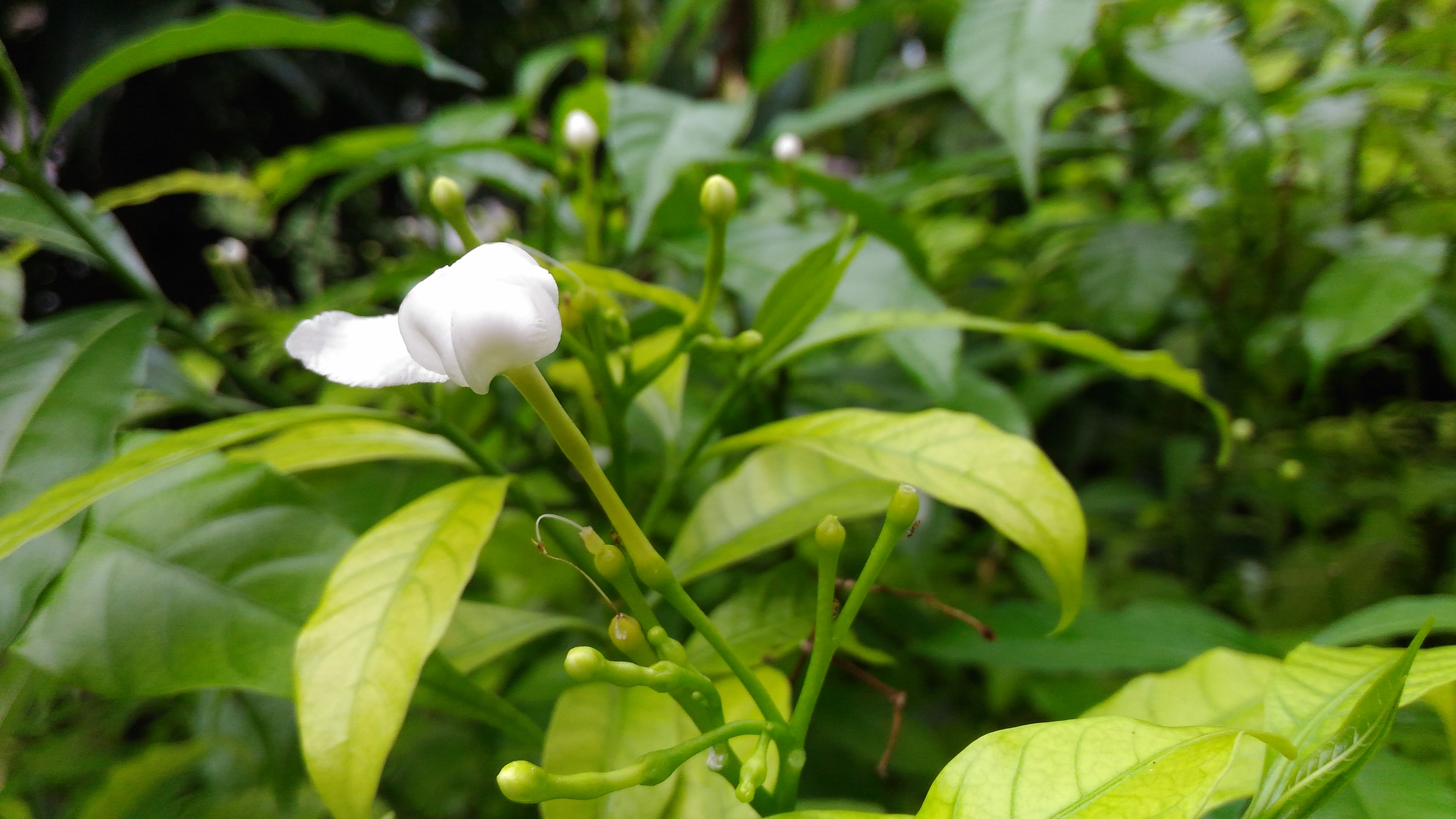
Before blossoming

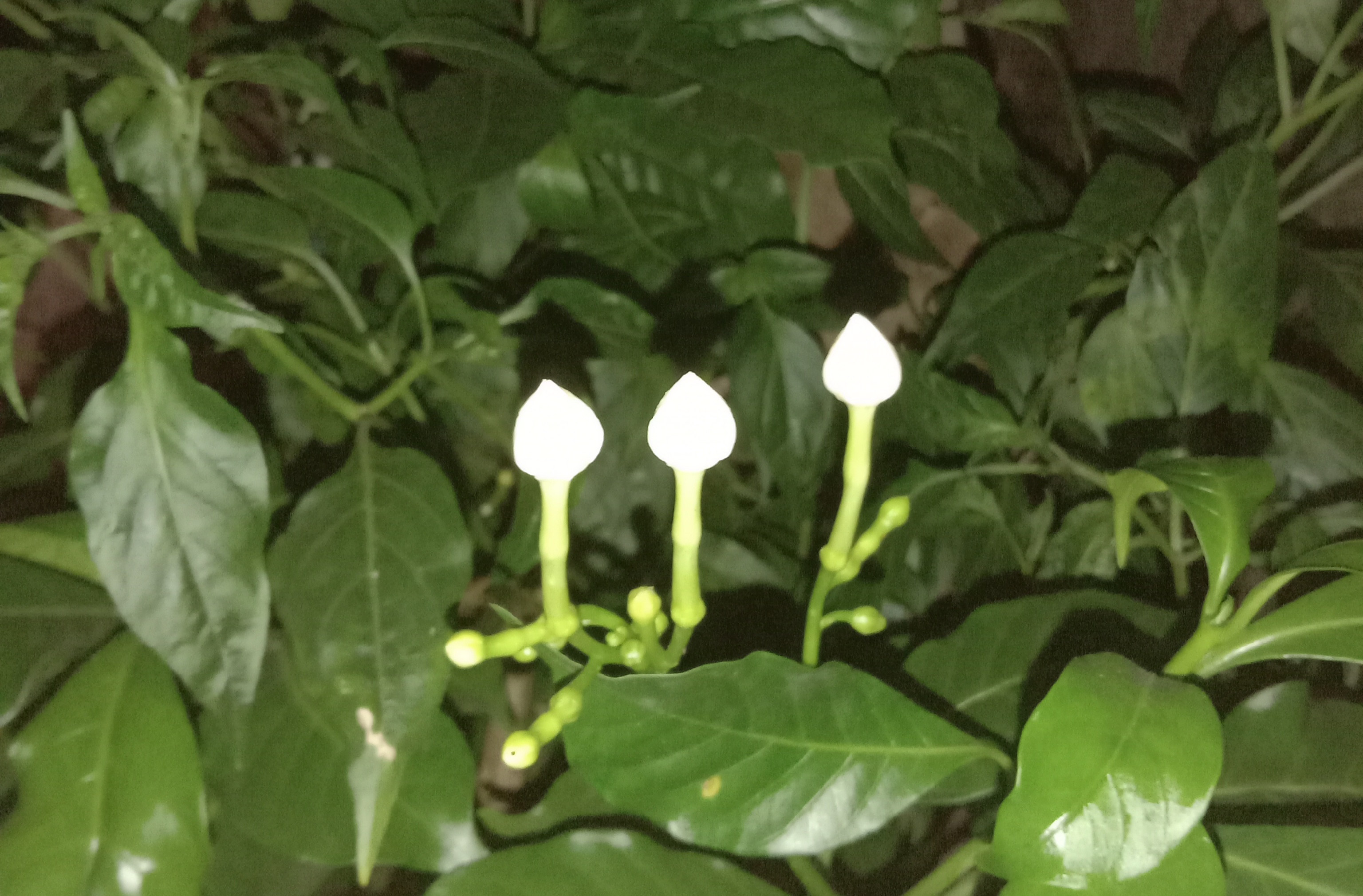
Flower buds at night

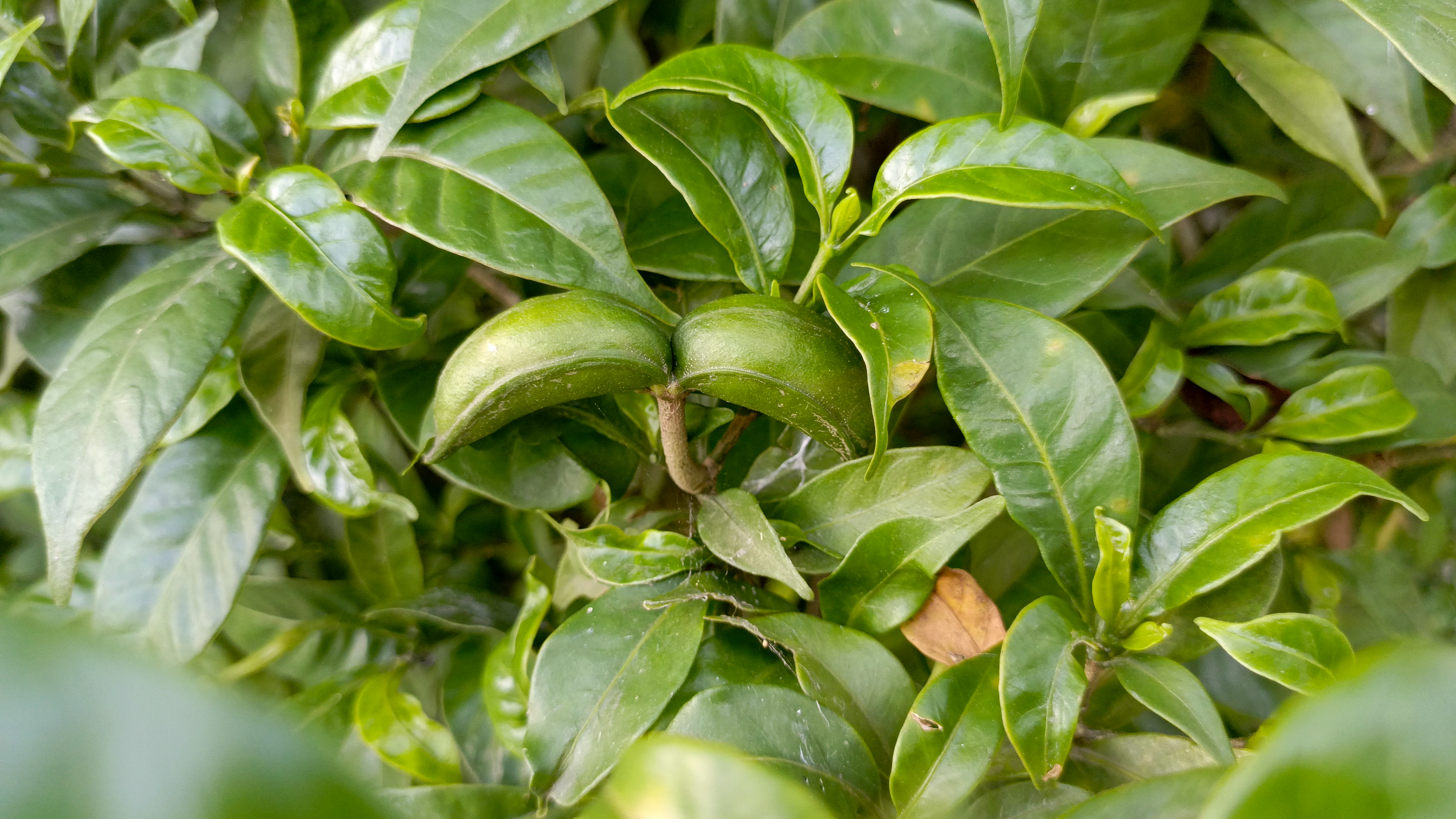
Seeds

== See also ==
- Tabernaemontana sananho
