= Tabernaemontana mocquerysii =

Scientific classification
- Kingdom: Plantae
- Clade: Tracheophytes
- Clade: Angiosperms
- Clade: Eudicots
- Clade: Asterids
- Order: Gentianales
- Family: Apocynaceae
- Genus: Tabernaemontana
- Species: T. mocquerysii

Binomial name
- Tabernaemontana mocquerysii Aug.DC.

Synonyms
- Pandaca boiteaui Markgr.; Pandaca mocquerysi (Aug.DC.) Markgr.; Pandaca mocquerysi var. lancifolia Markgr.; Pandaca mocquerysi var. parvifolia (Pichon) Markgr.; Pandaca mocquerysi var. pendula Markgr.; Pandaca parvifolia (Pichon) Markgr.; Pandaca verrucosa Markgr.; Tabernaemontana parvifolia Pichon

Species of plant

Tabernaemontana mocquerysii is a species of plant in the family Apocynaceae. It is found in Madagascar.
