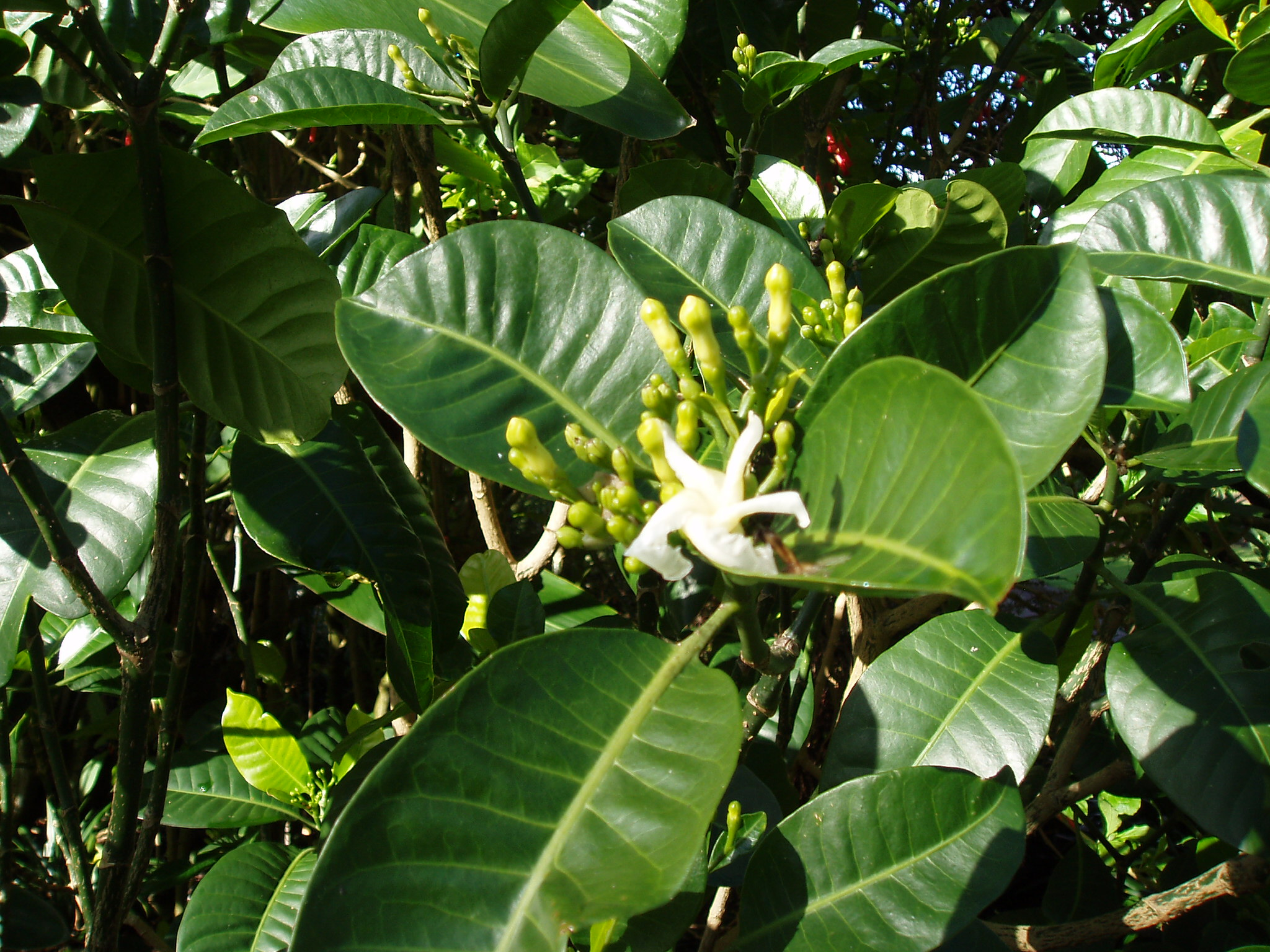

Scientific classification
- Kingdom: Plantae
- Clade: Tracheophytes
- Clade: Angiosperms
- Clade: Eudicots
- Clade: Asterids
- Order: Gentianales
- Family: Apocynaceae
- Genus: Tabernaemontana
- Species: T. dichotoma

Binomial name
- Tabernaemontana dichotoma Roxb. ex Wall.

Synonyms
- Cerbera dichotoma G.Lodd.; Ervatamia dichotoma (Roxb. ex Wall.) Burkill; Pagiantha dichotoma (Roxb. ex Wall.) Markgr.; Rejoua dichotoma (Roxb. ex Wall.) Gamble; Tabernaemontana laurifolia Ker Gawl.; Tanghinia dichotoma G.Don

= Tabernaemontana dichotoma =

Species of plant

Tabernaemontana dichotoma, commonly known as Eve's apple, is a plant in the dogbane family Apocynaceae. The specific epithet refers to the species' dichotomous branches.

== Description ==
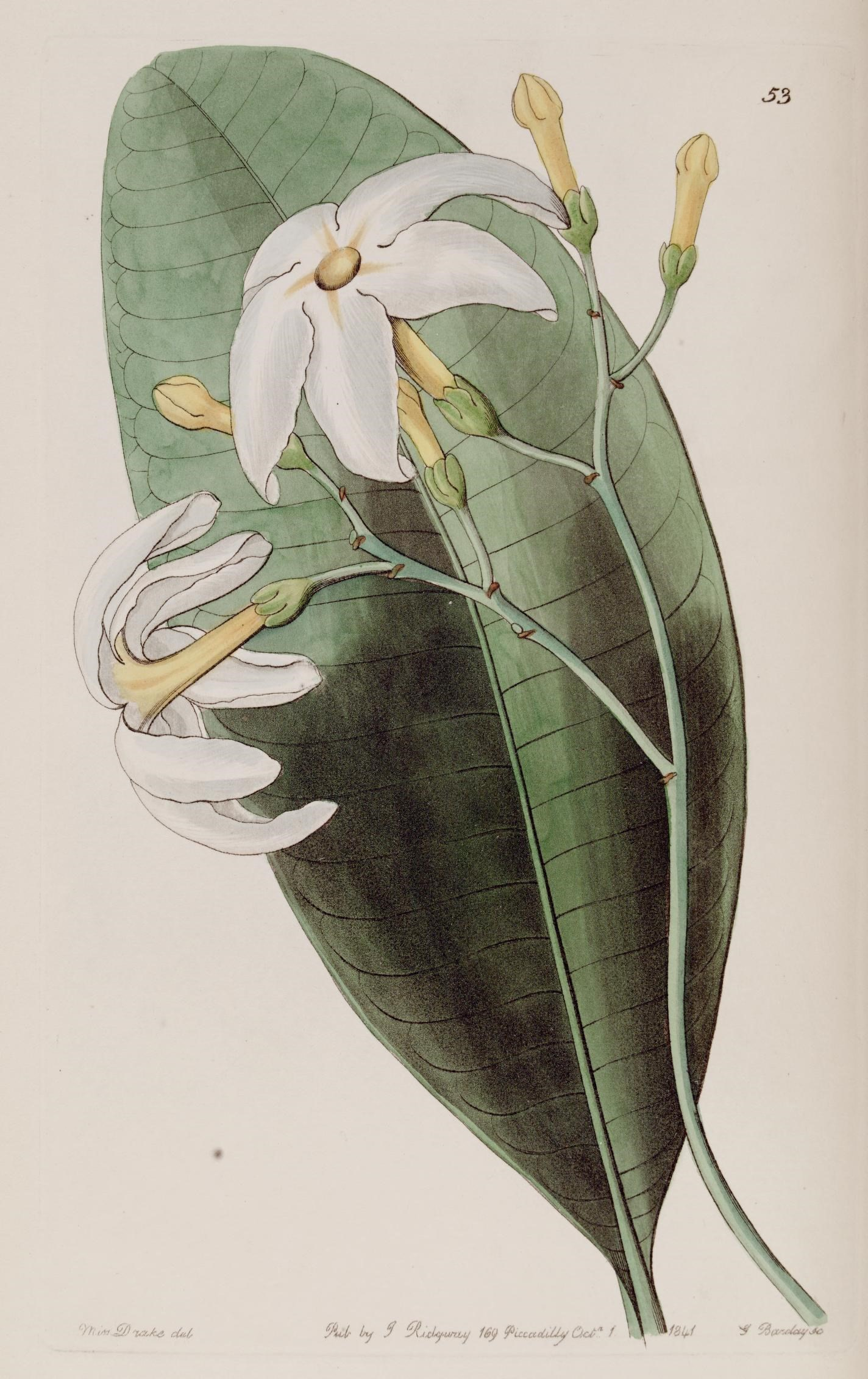
Illustration from 1841

Tabernaemontana dichotoma grows as a shrub or tree, measuring from 2–12 metres (10–40 ft) tall, rarely to 20 m (70 ft). The trunk measures up 30 cm (12 in) in diameter. The plant's latex, fruit and seeds are all poisonous.

== Distribution and habitat ==
Tabernaemontana dichotoma is native to Sri Lanka. It occurs at altitudes to around 600 m (2,000 ft).
