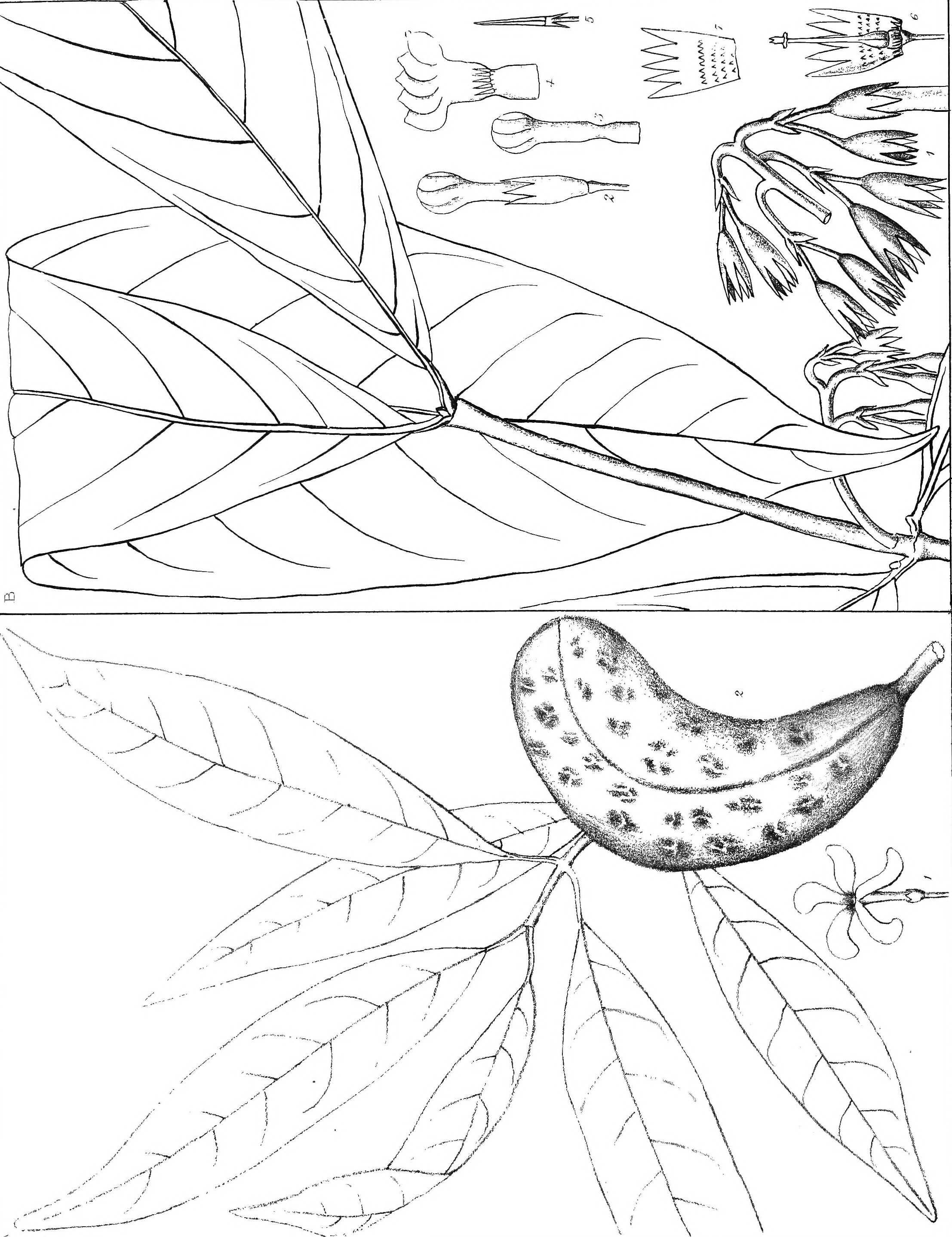

Scientific classification
- Kingdom: Plantae
- Clade: Tracheophytes
- Clade: Angiosperms
- Clade: Eudicots
- Clade: Asterids
- Order: Gentianales
- Family: Apocynaceae
- Genus: Tabernaemontana
- Species: T. cymosa

Binomial name
- Tabernaemontana cymosa Jacq.

Synonyms
- 16 Synonyms: Peschiera cymosa (Jacq.) Dugand; Taberna cymosa (Jacq.) Miers; Merizadenia arcuata (Ruiz & Pav.) Miers; Peschiera arcuata (Ruiz & Pav.) Markgr.; Peschiera buchtienii (H.J.P.Winkl.) Markgr.; Peschiera concinna Miers; Peschiera psychotriifolia (Kunth) Miers; Peschiera puberiflora Miers; Peschiera umbrosa (Kunth) Miers; Tabernaemontana arcuata Ruiz & Pav.; Tabernaemontana buchtienii H.J.P.Winkl.; Tabernaemontana concinna (Miers) J.F.Macbr.; Tabernaemontana mapirensis Rusby; Tabernaemontana psychotriifolia Kunth; Tabernaemontana psychotrioides G.Don; Tabernaemontana umbrosa Kunth

= Tabernaemontana cymosa =

Species of flowering plant

Tabernaemontana cymosa is a species of plants in the oleander and frangipani family Apocynaceae. It is native to tropical South America and has a conservation status of least concern.
