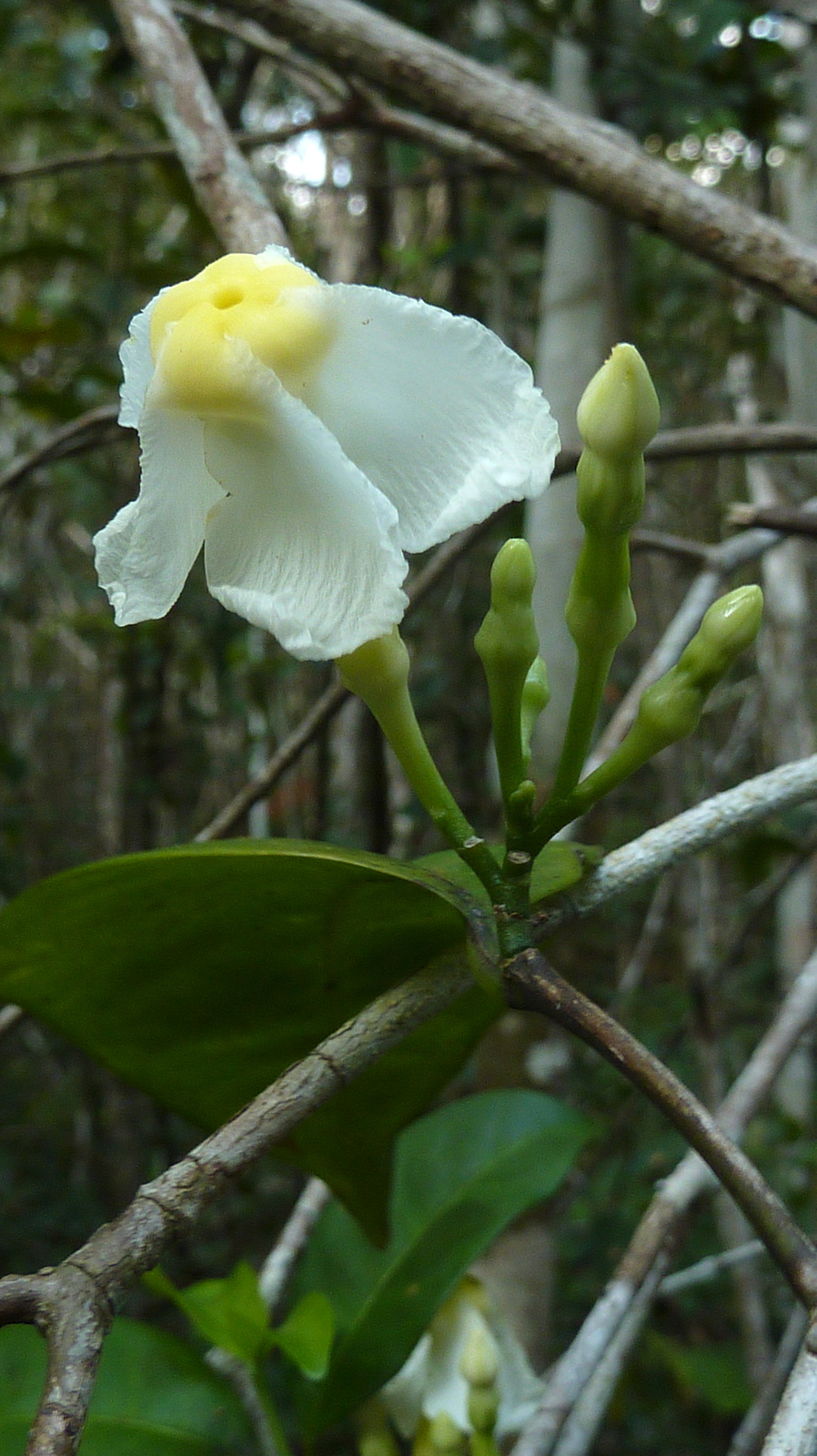
- Tabernaemontana flavicans

Scientific classification
- Kingdom: Plantae
- Clade: Tracheophytes
- Clade: Angiosperms
- Clade: Eudicots
- Clade: Asterids
- Order: Gentianales
- Family: Apocynaceae
- Genus: Tabernaemontana
- Species: T. flavicans

Binomial name
- Tabernaemontana flavicans Willd. ex Roem. & Schult.

Synonyms
- Anartia flavicans (Willd. ex Roem. & Schult.) Miers; Anartia glabrata Miers; Anartia oblongifolia (A.DC.) Markgr.; Anartia olivacea (Müll.Arg.) Markgr.; Bonafousia latiflora Miers; Bonafousia oblongifolia (A.DC.) Miers; Bonafousia olivacea (Müll.Arg.) Miers; Peschiera latiflora Benth. ex Miers; Taberna disparifolia Miers; Tabernaemontana glabrata Mart. ex Miers; Tabernaemontana laevigata Mart. ex Müll.Arg.; Tabernaemontana oblongifolia A.DC.; Tabernaemontana olivacea Müll.Arg.

= Tabernaemontana flavicans =

Species of plant

Tabernaemontana flavicans is a species of plant in the family Apocynaceae. It is found in northwestern South America.
