= Tabernaemontana cuspidata =

Scientific classification
- Kingdom: Plantae
- Clade: Tracheophytes
- Clade: Angiosperms
- Clade: Eudicots
- Clade: Asterids
- Order: Gentianales
- Family: Apocynaceae
- Genus: Tabernaemontana
- Species: T. cuspidata

Binomial name
- Tabernaemontana cuspidata Rusby

Synonyms
- Anacampta kuhlmannii Markgr.; Anacampta tenuicornuta Markgr.; Anartia cuspidata (Rusby) L.Allorge; Woytkowskia kuhlmannii (Markgr.) L.Allorge; Woytkowskia spermatochorda Woodson

Species of plant

Tabernaemontana cuspidata is a species of plant in the family Apocynaceae. It is found in northwestern South America.
