= Tabernaemontana stenosiphon =

Conservation status
- Near Threatened (IUCN 2.3)

Scientific classification
- Kingdom: Plantae
- Clade: Tracheophytes
- Clade: Angiosperms
- Clade: Eudicots
- Clade: Asterids
- Order: Gentianales
- Family: Apocynaceae
- Genus: Tabernaemontana
- Species: T. stenosiphon

Binomial name
- Tabernaemontana stenosiphon Stapf

Synonyms
- Conopharyngia stenosiphon (Stapf) Stapf

Species of plant

Tabernaemontana stenosiphon, commonly known as cata, cata-d'ôbo, cata-piquina, or pau-lírio, is a species of plant in the family Apocynaceae that is endemic to São Tomé Island. It is a small tree with fragrant white flowers.
