= Tabernaemontana solanifolia =

Scientific classification
- Kingdom: Plantae
- Clade: Tracheophytes
- Clade: Angiosperms
- Clade: Eudicots
- Clade: Asterids
- Order: Gentianales
- Family: Apocynaceae
- Genus: Tabernaemontana
- Species: T. solanifolia

Binomial name
- Tabernaemontana solanifolia A.DC.

Synonyms
- Peschiera affinis var. campestris Rizzini; Peschiera campestris (Rizzini) Rizzini; Peschiera fallax (Müll.Arg.) Miers; Peschiera solanifolia (A.DC.) Miers; Peschiera solanifolia var. fallax (Müll.Arg.) L.Allorge; Tabernaemontana accedens Müll.Arg.; Tabernaemontana affinis var. campestris Rizzini; Tabernaemontana fallax Müll.Arg.; Tabernaemontana nervosa Glaz.; Tabernaemontana warmingii Müll.Arg.

Species of plant

Tabernaemontana solanifolia is a species of plant in the family Apocynaceae. It is found in Brazil.
