= Tabernaemontana cerea =

Scientific classification
- Kingdom: Plantae
- Clade: Tracheophytes
- Clade: Angiosperms
- Clade: Eudicots
- Clade: Asterids
- Order: Gentianales
- Family: Apocynaceae
- Genus: Tabernaemontana
- Species: T. cerea

Binomial name
- Tabernaemontana cerea (Woodson) Leeuwenb.

Synonyms
- Anartia cerea (Woodson) L.Allorge; Stemmadenia cerea Woodson

Species of plant

Tabernaemontana cerea is a species of plant in the family Apocynaceae. It is found in Venezuela, Guyana, and Suriname.
