= Tabernaemontana bovina =

Conservation status
- Least Concern (IUCN 3.1)

Scientific classification
- Kingdom: Plantae
- Clade: Tracheophytes
- Clade: Angiosperms
- Clade: Eudicots
- Clade: Asterids
- Order: Gentianales
- Family: Apocynaceae
- Genus: Tabernaemontana
- Species: T. bovina

Binomial name
- Tabernaemontana bovina Lour.

Synonyms
- List: Ervatamia bovina (Lour.) Markgr.; Ervatamia tonkinensis (Pierre ex Pit.) Markgr.; Tabernaemontana tonkinensis Pierre ex Pit.; Ervatamia balansae (Pit.) Pichon; Ervatamia balansae var. macrophylla Lý; Ervatamia bonii (Pit.) Pichon; Ervatamia dakgleiensis Lý; Ervatamia daktoensis Lý; Ervatamia hoabinhensis Lý; Ervatamia lamdongensis Lý; Ervatamia longocuspidata Lý; Ervatamia nemoralis (Pit.) Markgr.; Ervatamia officinalis Tsiang; Ervatamia pallida Pierre ex Spire; Ervatamia petelotii Lý; Tabernaemontana balansae Pit.; Tabernaemontana balansae var. macrophylla (Lý) Lý; Tabernaemontana bonii Pit.; Tabernaemontana dakgleiensis (Lý) Lý; Tabernaemontana daktoensis (Lý) Lý; Tabernaemontana hoabinhensis (Lý) Lý; Tabernaemontana longocuspidata (Lý) Lý; Tabernaemontana nemoralis Pit.; Tabernaemontana officinalis (Tsiang) P.T.Li; Tabernaemontana pallida (Pierre ex Spire) Hu

Species of plant

Tabernaemontana bovina is a species of flowering plant in the family Apocynaceae. It is native to Cambodia, China, Laos, Myanmar, Thailand, and Vietnam.
