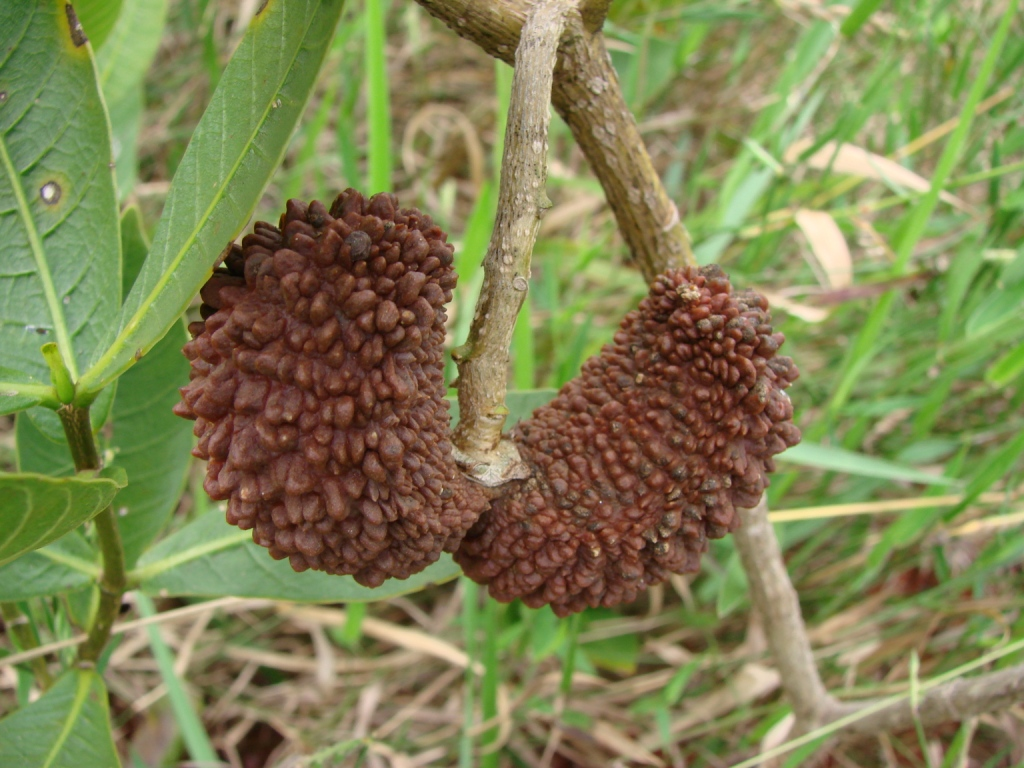

Scientific classification
- Kingdom: Plantae
- Clade: Tracheophytes
- Clade: Angiosperms
- Clade: Eudicots
- Clade: Asterids
- Order: Gentianales
- Family: Apocynaceae
- Genus: Tabernaemontana
- Species: T. hystrix

Binomial name
- Tabernaemontana hystrix Steud.

Synonyms
- Peschiera fuchsiaefolia (A. DC.) Miers; Peschiera fuchsiifolia (A.DC.) Miers; Peschiera gaudichaudii (A.DC.) Miers; Peschiera gracillima Miers; Peschiera granulosa Miers; Peschiera hystrix (Steud.) A.DC.; Peschiera lundii (A.DC.) Miers; Peschiera solandri Miers; Tabernaemontana bracteolaris Mart. ex Müll.Arg.; Tabernaemontana collina Gardner; Tabernaemontana echinata Vell.; Tabernaemontana fuchsiifolia A.DC.; Tabernaemontana gaudichaudii A.DC.; Tabernaemontana gracilis Müll.Arg.; Tabernaemontana gracillima (Miers) Pichon; Tabernaemontana lundii A.DC.

= Tabernaemontana hystrix =

Species of plant

Tabernaemontana hystrix is a species of plant in the family Apocynaceae. It is a shrub or tree and found in Brazil that grows in a dry tropical biome.
