= Tabernaemontana leeuwenbergiana =

Scientific classification
- Kingdom: Plantae
- Clade: Tracheophytes
- Clade: Angiosperms
- Clade: Eudicots
- Clade: Asterids
- Order: Gentianales
- Family: Apocynaceae
- Genus: Tabernaemontana
- Species: T. leeuwenbergiana

Binomial name
- Tabernaemontana leeuwenbergiana J.F.Morales

Species of plant

Tabernaemontana leeuwenbergiana is a species of plant in the family Apocynaceae. It is found in Colombia.
