= Tabernaemontana pauli =

Conservation status
- Near Threatened (IUCN 3.1)

Scientific classification
- Kingdom: Plantae
- Clade: Tracheophytes
- Clade: Angiosperms
- Clade: Eudicots
- Clade: Asterids
- Order: Gentianales
- Family: Apocynaceae
- Genus: Tabernaemontana
- Species: T. pauli

Binomial name
- Tabernaemontana pauli (Leeuwenb.) A.O.Simões & M.E.Endress

Synonyms
- Stemmadenia pauli Leeuwenb.

Species of plant

Tabernaemontana pauli is a species of plant in the family Apocynaceae. It is endemic to Costa Rica.
