= Tabernaemontana ternifolia =

Scientific classification
- Kingdom: Plantae
- Clade: Tracheophytes
- Clade: Angiosperms
- Clade: Eudicots
- Clade: Asterids
- Order: Gentianales
- Family: Apocynaceae
- Genus: Tabernaemontana
- Species: T. ternifolia

Binomial name
- Tabernaemontana ternifolia D.J.Middleton

Species of plant

Tabernaemontana ternifolia is a species of plant in the family Apocynaceae. It is found in Palawan.
