= Tabernaemontana eusepala =

Scientific classification
- Kingdom: Plantae
- Clade: Tracheophytes
- Clade: Angiosperms
- Clade: Eudicots
- Clade: Asterids
- Order: Gentianales
- Family: Apocynaceae
- Genus: Tabernaemontana
- Species: T. eusepala

Binomial name
- Tabernaemontana eusepala Aug.DC.

Synonyms
- Pandaca eusepala (Aug.DC.) Markgr.

Species of plant

Tabernaemontana eusepala is a species of plant in the family Apocynaceae. It is found in northeastern Madagascar.
