= Tabernaemontana antheonycta =

Conservation status
- Vulnerable (IUCN 2.3)

Scientific classification
- Kingdom: Plantae
- Clade: Tracheophytes
- Clade: Angiosperms
- Clade: Eudicots
- Clade: Asterids
- Order: Gentianales
- Family: Apocynaceae
- Genus: Tabernaemontana
- Species: T. antheonycta

Binomial name
- Tabernaemontana antheonycta Leeuwenberg

Species of plant

Tabernaemontana antheonycta is a species of plant in the family Apocynaceae occurring in Brunei and Bornean Malaysia.
