= Tabernaemontana polyneura =

Conservation status
- Least Concern (IUCN 3.1)

Scientific classification
- Kingdom: Plantae
- Clade: Tracheophytes
- Clade: Angiosperms
- Clade: Eudicots
- Clade: Asterids
- Order: Gentianales
- Family: Apocynaceae
- Genus: Tabernaemontana
- Species: T. polyneura

Binomial name
- Tabernaemontana polyneura (King & Gamble) D.J.Middleton

Synonyms
- Ervatamia polyneura King & Gamble; Ervatamia coriacea Ridl.

Species of plant

Tabernaemontana polyneura is a species of flowering plant in the family Apocynaceae. It is endemic to Peninsular Malaysia. It is threatened by habitat loss.
