= Tabernaemontana angulata =

Conservation status
- Least Concern (IUCN 3.1)

Scientific classification
- Kingdom: Plantae
- Clade: Tracheophytes
- Clade: Angiosperms
- Clade: Eudicots
- Clade: Asterids
- Order: Gentianales
- Family: Apocynaceae
- Genus: Tabernaemontana
- Species: T. angulata

Binomial name
- Tabernaemontana angulata Mart. ex Müll.Arg.

Synonyms
- Anacampta angulata (Mart. ex Müll.Arg.) Miers; Bonafousia angulata (Mart. ex Müll.Arg.) Boiteau & L.Allorge; Bonafousia silvae L.Allorge

Species of plant

Tabernaemontana angulata is a species of plant in the family Apocynaceae. It is native to Brazil.

== Use ==
In traditional Yanomami medicine, drinking a bark infusion from T. angulata is a treatment for intestinal worms.
