= Tabernaemontana sessilifolia =

Conservation status
- Least Concern (IUCN 3.1)

Scientific classification
- Kingdom: Plantae
- Clade: Tracheophytes
- Clade: Angiosperms
- Clade: Eudicots
- Clade: Asterids
- Order: Gentianales
- Family: Apocynaceae
- Genus: Tabernaemontana
- Species: T. sessilifolia

Binomial name
- Tabernaemontana sessilifolia Baker

Synonyms
- Muntafara sessilifolia (Baker) Pichon; Pagiantha sessilifolia (Baker) Markgr.

Species of plant

Tabernaemontana sessilifolia is a species of plant in the family Apocynaceae. It is found in Madagascar.
