= Tabernaemontana odoratissima =

Scientific classification
- Kingdom: Plantae
- Clade: Tracheophytes
- Clade: Angiosperms
- Clade: Eudicots
- Clade: Asterids
- Order: Gentianales
- Family: Apocynaceae
- Genus: Tabernaemontana
- Species: T. odoratissima

Binomial name
- Tabernaemontana odoratissima (Stapf) Leeuwenb.

Synonyms
- Gabunia odoratissima Stapf

Species of plant

Tabernaemontana odoratissima is a species of plant in the family Apocynaceae. It is found in Zaïre, Rwanda, Uganda, and Tanzania.
