= Tabernaemontana longipes =

Conservation status
- Least Concern (IUCN 3.1)

Scientific classification
- Kingdom: Plantae
- Clade: Tracheophytes
- Clade: Angiosperms
- Clade: Eudicots
- Clade: Asterids
- Order: Gentianales
- Family: Apocynaceae
- Genus: Tabernaemontana
- Species: T. longipes

Binomial name
- Tabernaemontana longipes Donn.Sm.

Species of plant

Tabernaemontana longipes is a tropical tree found in Colombia, Venezuela, Ecuador, Nicaragua, Panama, and Costa Rica. Its unusually shaped pods inspired the common name Dutchman's shoes. Its oval leaves are about 13 cm long and glabrous. The flowers are white.
