= Tabernaemontana calcarea =

Conservation status
- Least Concern (IUCN 3.1)

Scientific classification
- Kingdom: Plantae
- Clade: Tracheophytes
- Clade: Angiosperms
- Clade: Eudicots
- Clade: Asterids
- Order: Gentianales
- Family: Apocynaceae
- Genus: Tabernaemontana
- Species: T. calcarea

Binomial name
- Tabernaemontana calcarea Pichon

Synonyms
- Hazunta decaryi Markgr.; Pandaca affinis Markgr.; Pandaca caducifolia Markgr.; Pandaca calcarea (Pichon) Markgr.; Pandaca minutiflora (Pichon) Markgr.; Tabernaemontana minutiflora Pichon

Species of plant

Tabernaemontana calcarea is a species of plant in the family Apocynaceae. It is endemic to Madagascar.
