= Tabernaemontana lagenaria =

Scientific classification
- Kingdom: Plantae
- Clade: Tracheophytes
- Clade: Angiosperms
- Clade: Eudicots
- Clade: Asterids
- Order: Gentianales
- Family: Apocynaceae
- Genus: Tabernaemontana
- Species: T. lagenaria

Binomial name
- Tabernaemontana lagenaria Leeuwenb.

Species of plant

Tabernaemontana lagenaria is a species of plant in the family Apocynaceae. It is found in French Guinea, northern Brazil, and Peru.
