= Tabernaemontana laurifolia =

Conservation status
- Near Threatened (IUCN 3.1)

Scientific classification
- Kingdom: Plantae
- Clade: Tracheophytes
- Clade: Angiosperms
- Clade: Eudicots
- Clade: Asterids
- Order: Gentianales
- Family: Apocynaceae
- Genus: Tabernaemontana
- Species: T. laurifolia

Binomial name
- Tabernaemontana laurifolia L.

Synonyms
- Taberna laurina Miers; Tabernaemontana frutescens Miers

Species of plant

Tabernaemontana laurifolia is a species of plant in the family Apocynaceae. It is found in the Cayman Islands and Jamaica.
