= Tabernaemontana vanheurckii =

Scientific classification
- Kingdom: Plantae
- Clade: Tracheophytes
- Clade: Angiosperms
- Clade: Eudicots
- Clade: Asterids
- Order: Gentianales
- Family: Apocynaceae
- Genus: Tabernaemontana
- Species: T. vanheurckii

Binomial name
- Tabernaemontana vanheurckii Müll.Arg.

Synonyms
- Peschiera blanda Miers; Peschiera lingulata Miers; Peschiera vanheurckii (Müll.Arg.) L.Allorge; Stenosolen macrosiphon (Herzog) Markgr.; Stenosolen vanheurckii (Müll.Arg.) Markgr.; Tabernaemontana macrosiphon Herzog; Tabernaemontana unguiculata Rusby

Species of flowering plant

Tabernaemontana vanheurckii is a species of plant in the family Apocynaceae. It is found in northwestern South America.
