= Tabernaemontana laeta =

Scientific classification
- Kingdom: Plantae
- Clade: Tracheophytes
- Clade: Angiosperms
- Clade: Eudicots
- Clade: Asterids
- Order: Gentianales
- Family: Apocynaceae
- Genus: Tabernaemontana
- Species: T. laeta

Binomial name
- Tabernaemontana laeta Mart.

Synonyms
- Peschiera breviflora (Müll. Arg.) Miers; Peschiera brevifolia (Müll.Arg.) Miers; Peschiera florida Miers; Peschiera laeta (Mart.) Miers; Peschiera spixiana (Mart. ex Müll.Arg.) Miers; Tabernaemontana breviflora Müll.Arg.; Tabernaemontana laeta var. densa Müll.Arg.; Tabernaemontana laeta var. minor Müll.Arg.; Tabernaemontana laeta var. pubiflora Müll.Arg.; Tabernaemontana spixiana Mart. ex Müll.Arg.

Species of plant

Tabernaemontana laeta is a species of plant in the family Apocynaceae. It is found in Brazil.
