= Tabernaemontana panamensis =

Conservation status
- Least Concern (IUCN 3.1)

Scientific classification
- Kingdom: Plantae
- Clade: Tracheophytes
- Clade: Angiosperms
- Clade: Eudicots
- Clade: Asterids
- Order: Gentianales
- Family: Apocynaceae
- Genus: Tabernaemontana
- Species: T. panamensis

Binomial name
- Tabernaemontana panamensis (Markgr., Boiteau & L.Allorge) Leeuwenb.

Synonyms
- Homotypic Synonyms: Bonafousia panamensis Markgr., Boiteau & L.Allorge

Species of plant

Tabernaemontana panamensis is a species of flowering plant in the family Apocynaceae. It is native to Colombia, Ecuador, and Panama.
