= Tabernaemontana peduncularis =

Scientific classification
- Kingdom: Plantae
- Clade: Tracheophytes
- Clade: Angiosperms
- Clade: Eudicots
- Clade: Asterids
- Order: Gentianales
- Family: Apocynaceae
- Genus: Tabernaemontana
- Species: T. peduncularis

Binomial name
- Tabernaemontana peduncularis Wall.

Synonyms
- Ervatamia graciliflora (Wall.) Lace; Ervatamia langbianensis Lý; Ervatamia peduncularis (Wall.) King & Gamble; Ervatamia repeunsis Pierre ex Spire; Tabernaemontana collignonae Van Heurck & Müll.Arg.; Tabernaemontana graciliflora Wall.; Tabernaemontana repoevensis Pierre ex Pit.

Species of plant

Tabernaemontana peduncularis is a species of plant in the family Apocynaceae. It is found in Indochina and western Malaysia.
