= Tabernaemontana humblotii =

Conservation status
- Least Concern (IUCN 3.1)

Scientific classification
- Kingdom: Plantae
- Clade: Tracheophytes
- Clade: Angiosperms
- Clade: Eudicots
- Clade: Asterids
- Order: Gentianales
- Family: Apocynaceae
- Genus: Tabernaemontana
- Species: T. humblotii

Binomial name
- Tabernaemontana humblotii (Baill.) Pichon

Synonyms
- Ochronerium humblotii Baill.; Pandaca humblotii (Baill.) Markgr.; Pandaca speciosa Markgr.

Species of plant

Tabernaemontana humblotii is a species of plant in the family Apocynaceae. It is found in Madagascar.
