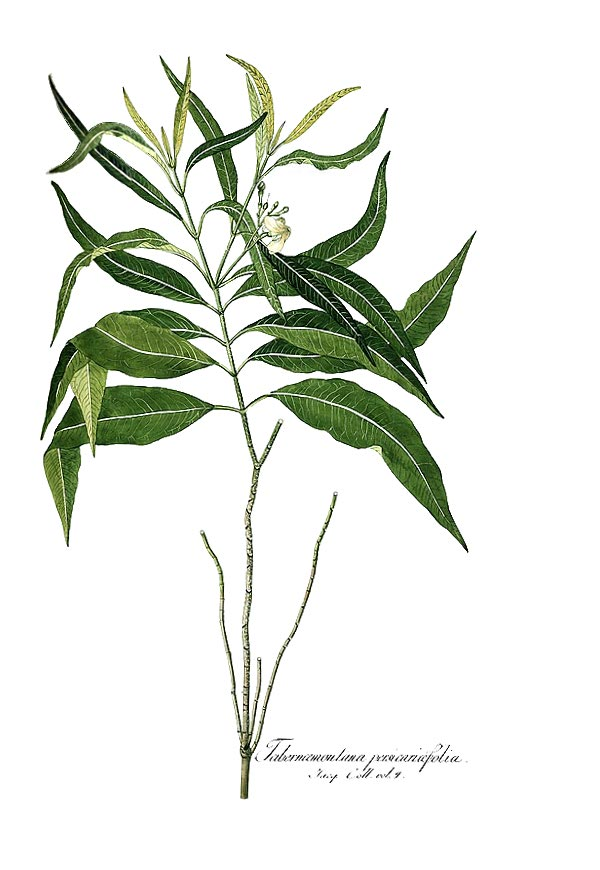

Conservation status
- Endangered (IUCN 2.3)

Scientific classification
- Kingdom: Plantae
- Clade: Tracheophytes
- Clade: Angiosperms
- Clade: Eudicots
- Clade: Asterids
- Order: Gentianales
- Family: Apocynaceae
- Genus: Tabernaemontana
- Species: T. persicariifolia

Binomial name
- Tabernaemontana persicariifolia Jacq.

= Tabernaemontana persicariifolia =

Species of plant

Tabernaemontana persicariifolia is a species of plant in the family Apocynaceae. It is found in Mauritius and Réunion in the Indian Ocean. The species is listed as endangered.

The epithet "persicariifolia" is sometimes spelled "persicariaefolia." This is a misspelling to be corrected according to the International Code of Nomenclature for algae, fungi, and plants, article 60.8.
