= Tabernaemontana brachyantha =

Conservation status
- Least Concern (IUCN 3.1)

Scientific classification
- Kingdom: Plantae
- Clade: Tracheophytes
- Clade: Angiosperms
- Clade: Eudicots
- Clade: Asterids
- Order: Gentianales
- Family: Apocynaceae
- Genus: Tabernaemontana
- Species: T. brachyantha

Binomial name
- Tabernaemontana brachyantha Stapf

Synonyms
- Conopharyngia brachyantha (Stapf) Stapf

Species of plant

Tabernaemontana brachyantha is a species of plant in the family Apocynaceae. It is native to equatorial Africa, including Cameroon, the Democratic Republic of the Congo, Equatorial Guinea, Gabon, Nigeria and islands in the Gulf of Guinea.
