= Tabernaemontana disticha =

Scientific classification
- Kingdom: Plantae
- Clade: Tracheophytes
- Clade: Angiosperms
- Clade: Eudicots
- Clade: Asterids
- Order: Gentianales
- Family: Apocynaceae
- Genus: Tabernaemontana
- Species: T. disticha

Binomial name
- Tabernaemontana disticha A.DC.

Synonyms
- Anacampta disticha (A.DC.) Markgr.; Bonafousia disticha (A.DC.) Boiteau & L.Allorge; Taberna disticha (A.DC.) Miers

Species of plant

Tabernaemontana disticha is a species of plant in the family Apocynaceae. It is found in northern South America.
