= Tabernaemontana wullschlaegelii =

Conservation status
- Near Threatened (IUCN 2.3)

Scientific classification
- Kingdom: Plantae
- Clade: Tracheophytes
- Clade: Angiosperms
- Clade: Eudicots
- Clade: Asterids
- Order: Gentianales
- Family: Apocynaceae
- Genus: Tabernaemontana
- Species: T. wullschlaegelii

Binomial name
- Tabernaemontana wullschlaegelii Griseb.

Synonyms
- Anartia wulfschlaegelii (Griseb.) Miers; Tabernaemontana calcicola Urb.; Tabernaemontana glaucescens Urb.; Tabernaemontana lactea Urb.; Tabernaemontana rendlei Stearn; Tabernaemontana wullschlaegelii var. glaucescens (Urb.) L.Allorge; Tabernaemontana wullschlaegelii var. rendlei (Stearn) L.Allorge

Species of plant

Tabernaemontana wullschlaegelii is a species of flowering plant in the family Apocynaceae. It is endemic to Jamaica.
