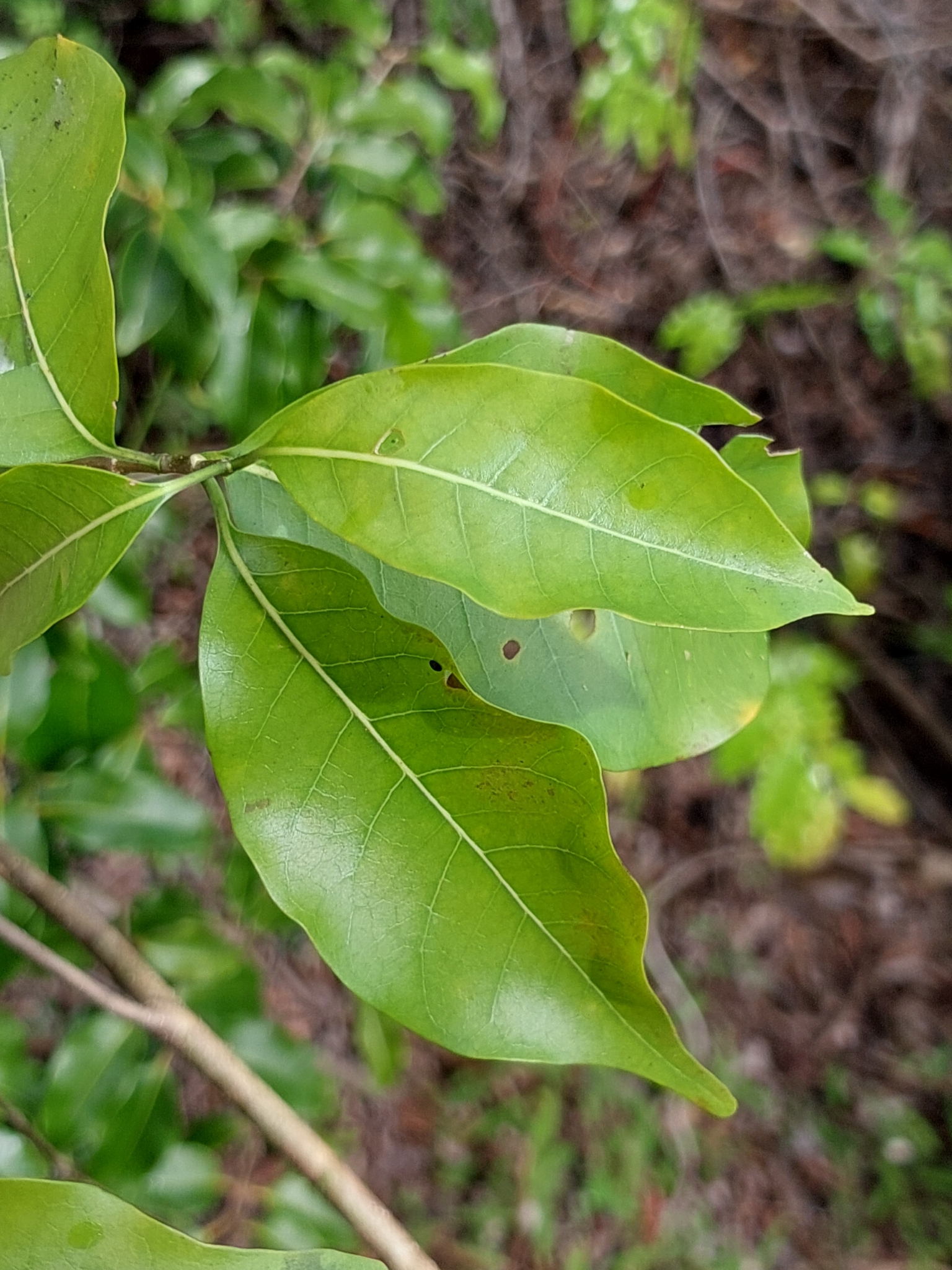
- In Madagascar

Conservation status
- Least Concern (IUCN 3.1)

Scientific classification
- Kingdom: Plantae
- Clade: Embryophytes
- Clade: Tracheophytes
- Clade: Angiosperms
- Clade: Eudicots
- Clade: Asterids
- Order: Gentianales
- Family: Apocynaceae
- Genus: Tabernaemontana
- Species: T. coffeoides

Binomial name
- Tabernaemontana coffeoides Bojer ex. A.DC.

Synonyms
- List: Conopharyngia coffeoides (Bojer ex A.DC.) Summerh.; Hazunta coffeoides (Bojer ex A.DC.) Pichon; Ervatamia membranacea (A.DC.) Markgr.; Ervatamia methuenii Stapf & M.L.Green; Ervatamia modesta (Baker) Stapf; Hazunta angustifolia Pichon; Hazunta costata Markgr.; Hazunta graciliflora Pichon; Hazunta membranacea (A.DC.) Pichon; Hazunta modesta (Baker) Pichon; Hazunta silicicola Pichon; Hazunta velutina Pichon; Tabernaemontana membranacea A.DC.; Tabernaemontana modesta Baker

= Tabernaemontana coffeoides =

Species of plant in the dogbane family

Tabernaemontana coffeoides is a species of flowering plant in the family Apocynaceae. It grows as a shrub or small tree up to 10 m (30 ft) tall, with a trunk diameter of up to 20 cm (8 in). Its fragrant flowers feature white corolla lobes. Its habitat is on dunes or on rocks in dry forest, bush or savanna from sea level to 1,300 m (4,300 ft) altitude. Local medicinal uses include for weight loss and to combat fatigue. Tabernaemontana coffeoides is native to the Comoros and Madagascar. It is rich in pharmacologically interesting indole alkaloids.
