= Tabernaemontana aurantiaca =

Conservation status
- Least Concern (IUCN 3.1)

Scientific classification
- Kingdom: Plantae
- Clade: Tracheophytes
- Clade: Angiosperms
- Clade: Eudicots
- Clade: Asterids
- Order: Gentianales
- Family: Apocynaceae
- Genus: Tabernaemontana
- Species: T. aurantiaca

Binomial name
- Tabernaemontana aurantiaca Gaudich.

Synonyms
- Rejoua aurantiaca (Gaudich.) Gaudich.; Rejoua novoguineensis (Scheff.) Markgr.; Tabernaemontana anguinea Hemsl.; Tabernaemontana aurantiaca f. anguinea (Hemsl.) Leeuwenb.; Tabernaemontana longipedunculata K.Schum.; Tabernaemontana novoguineensis Scheff.; Tabernaemontana pentasticta Scheff.

Species of plant

Tabernaemontana aurantiaca is a species of plant in the family Apocynaceae (dogbane family) with the common name orange milkwood. It is native to Maluku, Papuasia, Vanuatu, the Santa Cruz Islands and Palau.

This species is distributed across:

- Moluccas (Indonesian islands)
- Bismarck Archipelago
- New Guinea (island)
- Solomon Islands
- Vanuatu
- Palau

No subspecies are listed.
