= Tabernaemontana eusepaloides =

Conservation status
- Vulnerable (IUCN 3.1)

Scientific classification
- Kingdom: Plantae
- Clade: Tracheophytes
- Clade: Angiosperms
- Clade: Eudicots
- Clade: Asterids
- Order: Gentianales
- Family: Apocynaceae
- Genus: Tabernaemontana
- Species: T. eusepaloides

Binomial name
- Tabernaemontana eusepaloides (Markgr.) Leeuwenb.

Synonyms
- Pandaca eusepaloides Markgr.

Species of plant

Tabernaemontana eusepaloides is a species of flowering plant in the family Apocynaceae. It is found in northeastern Madagascar.
