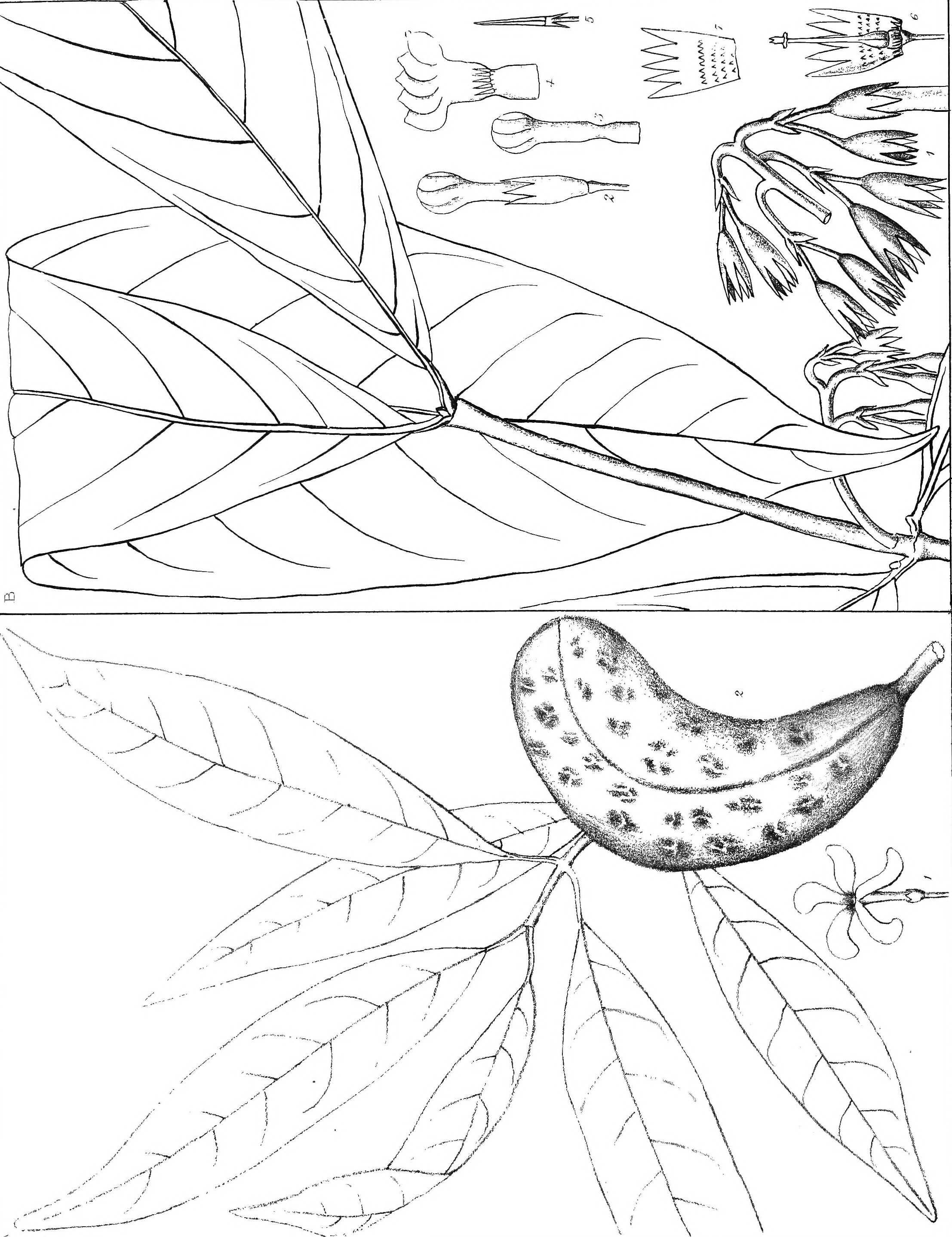

Scientific classification
- Kingdom: Plantae
- Clade: Tracheophytes
- Clade: Angiosperms
- Clade: Eudicots
- Clade: Asterids
- Order: Gentianales
- Family: Apocynaceae
- Genus: Tabernaemontana
- Species: T. macrocalyx

Binomial name
- Tabernaemontana macrocalyx Müll.Arg.

Synonyms
- Anacampta macrocalyx (Müll.Arg.) Markgr.; Anacampta muelleriana (Mart. ex Müll.Arg.) Markgr.; Bonafousia macrocalyx (Müll.Arg.) Boiteau & L.Allorge; Bonafousia morettii L.Allorge; Bonafousia muelleriana (Mart. ex Müll.Arg.) Boiteau & L.Allorge; Codonemma calycinum Miers; Codonemma macrocalyx (Müll.Arg.) Miers; Odontadenia macrocalyx (Müll.Arg.) Miers; Quadricasaea caquetensis Woodson; Quadricasaea inaequilateralis Woodson; Tabernaemontana benthamiana Müll.Arg.; Tabernaemontana inaequilateralis (Woodson) Pichon; Tabernaemontana muelleriana Mart. ex Müll.Arg.

= Tabernaemontana macrocalyx =

Species of plant

Tabernaemontana macrocalyx is a species of plant in the family Apocynaceae. It is found in northern South America.

The plant is sometimes harvested from the wild for local medicinal use.
