= Tabernaemontana pauciflora =

Scientific classification
- Kingdom: Plantae
- Clade: Embryophytes
- Clade: Tracheophytes
- Clade: Spermatophytes
- Clade: Angiosperms
- Clade: Eudicots
- Clade: Asterids
- Order: Gentianales
- Family: Apocynaceae
- Genus: Tabernaemontana
- Species: T. pauciflora

Binomial name
- Tabernaemontana pauciflora Blume

Synonyms
- List: Ervatamia blumeana Markgr.; Ervatamia calycina (Wall.) Lace; Ervatamia dinhensis (Pit.) Pichon; Ervatamia harmandiana (Pierre ex Pit.) Kerr; Ervatamia malaccensis (Hook.f.) King & Gamble; Ervatamia membranifolia (Kurz) Lace; Ervatamia polysperma (Merr.) Pichon; Ervatamia sralensis (Pierre ex Pit.) Kerr; Tabernaemontana calycina Wall.; Tabernaemontana dinhensis Pit.; Tabernaemontana harmandiana Pierre ex Pit.; Tabernaemontana malaccensis Hook.f.; Tabernaemontana membranifolia Kurz; Tabernaemontana polysperma Merr.; Tabernaemontana rhynchophylla Miq.; Tabernaemontana sralensis Pierre ex Pit.

Species of plant

Tabernaemontana pauciflora is a species of plant in the family Apocynaceae. The specific epithet pauciflora is Latin for 'few-flowered'.

== Description ==
It grows as a shrub or small tree up to 6 m (20 ft) tall, with a trunk diameter of up to 10 cm (4 in). The bark is pale grey to grey-brown. Inflorescences bear up to 15 flowers. The fragrant flowers feature white, sometimes yellow-throated, corolla lobes. The fruit is orange or yellow with paired follicles, up to 6 cm (2.4 in) in diameter.

== Distribution ==
Tabernaemontana pauciflora is native to Burma, Thailand, Cambodia, Vietnam, Borneo, Peninsular Malaysia, Singapore, Java and Sumatra.
