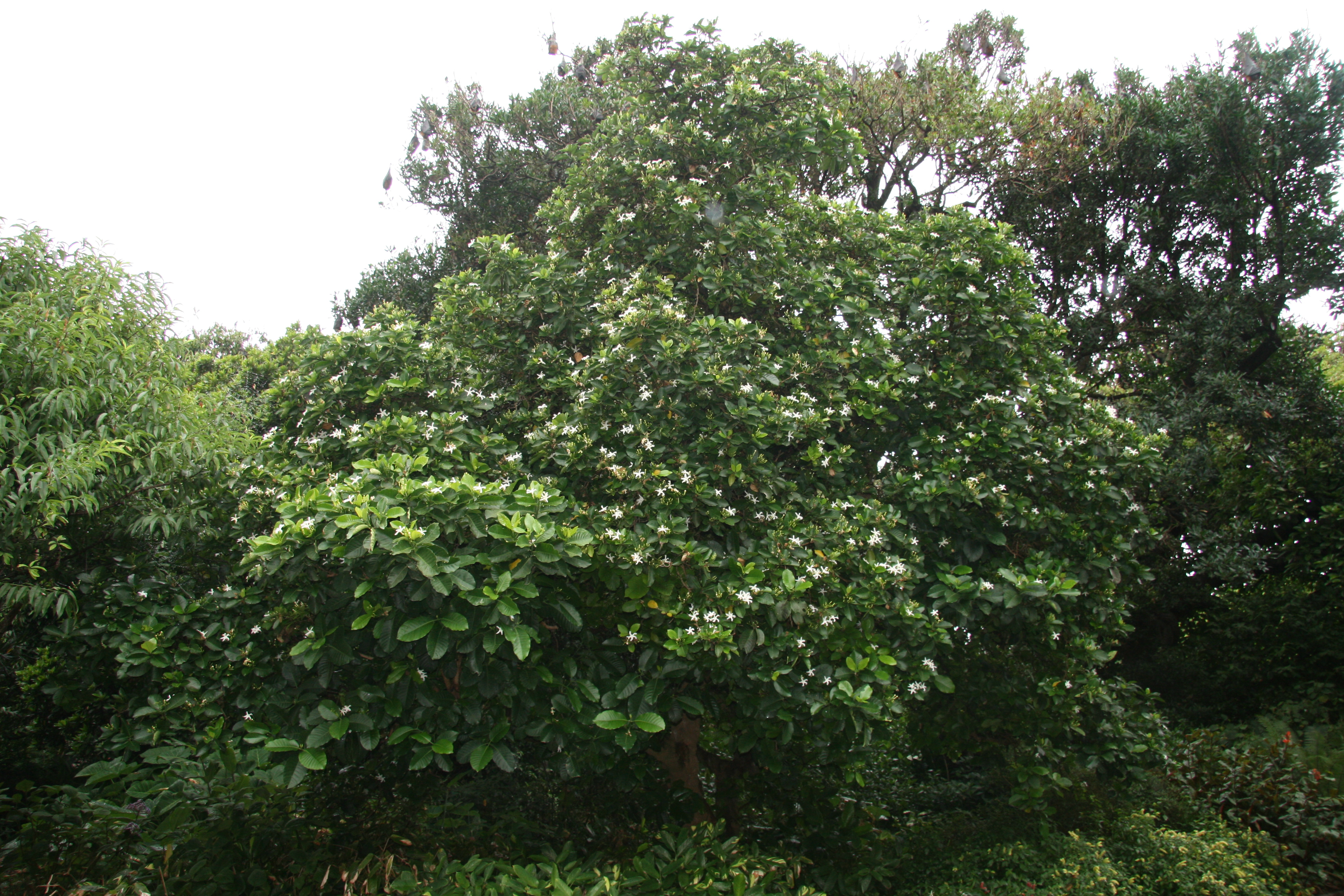
- tree, cult. Royal Botanic Gardens, Sydney

Scientific classification
- Kingdom: Plantae
- Clade: Tracheophytes
- Clade: Angiosperms
- Clade: Eudicots
- Clade: Asterids
- Order: Gentianales
- Family: Apocynaceae
- Genus: Tabernaemontana
- Species: T. cerifera

Binomial name
- Tabernaemontana cerifera Pancher & Sebert

= Tabernaemontana cerifera =

Species of plant

Tabernaemontana cerifera is a species of plant in the family Apocynaceae. It is found in New Caledonia.
