= Tabernaemontana amplifolia =

Conservation status
- Least Concern (IUCN 3.1)

Scientific classification
- Kingdom: Plantae
- Clade: Tracheophytes
- Clade: Angiosperms
- Clade: Eudicots
- Clade: Asterids
- Order: Gentianales
- Family: Apocynaceae
- Genus: Tabernaemontana
- Species: T. amplifolia

Binomial name
- Tabernaemontana amplifolia L.Allorge

Species of plant

Tabernaemontana amplifolia is a species of flowering plant in the family Apocynaceae. It is native to Colombia and Ecuador.
