= Tabernaemontana lorifera =

Scientific classification
- Kingdom: Plantae
- Clade: Tracheophytes
- Clade: Angiosperms
- Clade: Eudicots
- Clade: Asterids
- Order: Gentianales
- Family: Apocynaceae
- Genus: Tabernaemontana
- Species: T. lorifera

Binomial name
- Tabernaemontana lorifera (Miers) Leeuwenb.

Synonyms
- Homotypic Synonyms: Bonafousia lorifera (Miers) Boiteau & L.Allorge; Peschiera lorifera Miers; Heterotypic Synonyms: Tabernaemontana bicolor Klotzsch

Species of plant

Tabernaemontana lorifera is a species of flowering plant in the family Apocynaceae. It is found in northern Brazil, Guyana, and Suriname.
