= Tabernaemontana columbiensis =

Conservation status
- Least Concern (IUCN 3.1)

Scientific classification
- Kingdom: Plantae
- Clade: Tracheophytes
- Clade: Angiosperms
- Clade: Eudicots
- Clade: Asterids
- Order: Gentianales
- Family: Apocynaceae
- Genus: Tabernaemontana
- Species: T. columbiensis

Binomial name
- Tabernaemontana columbiensis (L.Allorge) Leeuwenb.

Synonyms
- Bonafousia columbiensis L.Allorge

Species of plant

Tabernaemontana columbiensis is a species of plant in the family Apocynaceae. It is native to Colombia, Ecuador, Panama, and Peru.
