= Tabernaemontana muricata =

Conservation status
- Endangered (IUCN 2.3)

Scientific classification
- Kingdom: Plantae
- Clade: Tracheophytes
- Clade: Angiosperms
- Clade: Eudicots
- Clade: Asterids
- Order: Gentianales
- Family: Apocynaceae
- Genus: Tabernaemontana
- Species: T. muricata

Binomial name
- Tabernaemontana muricata Link ex Roem. & Schult.

Species of plant

Tabernaemontana muricata is a species of plant in the family Apocynaceae. It is endemic to the state of Amazonas in northwestern Brazil. The species is listed as endangered.
