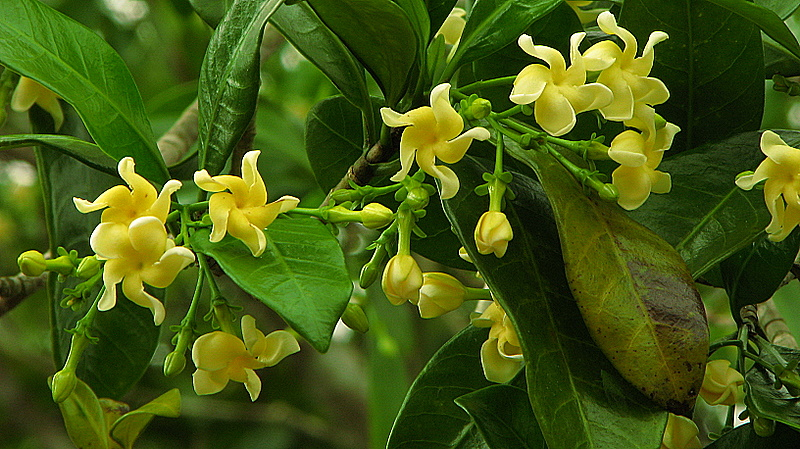
- Tabernaemontana salzmannii

Scientific classification
- Kingdom: Plantae
- Clade: Tracheophytes
- Clade: Angiosperms
- Clade: Eudicots
- Clade: Asterids
- Order: Gentianales
- Family: Apocynaceae
- Genus: Tabernaemontana
- Species: T. salzmannii

Binomial name
- Tabernaemontana salzmannii A.DC.

Synonyms
- Peschiera salzmannii (A.DC.) Miers; Tabernaemontana rauvolfiae A.DC.; Tabernaemontana rauwolfiae A. DC.; Tabernaemontana salzmannii var. lanceolata Müll.Arg.; Tabernaemontana salzmannii var. longifolia Müll.Arg.

= Tabernaemontana salzmannii =

Species of plant

Tabernaemontana salzmannii is a species of plant in the family Apocynaceae. It is found in eastern Brazil.Tabernaemontana salzmannii is a semideciduous shrub or tree with an oval crown; it can grow up to 11 metres tall.
