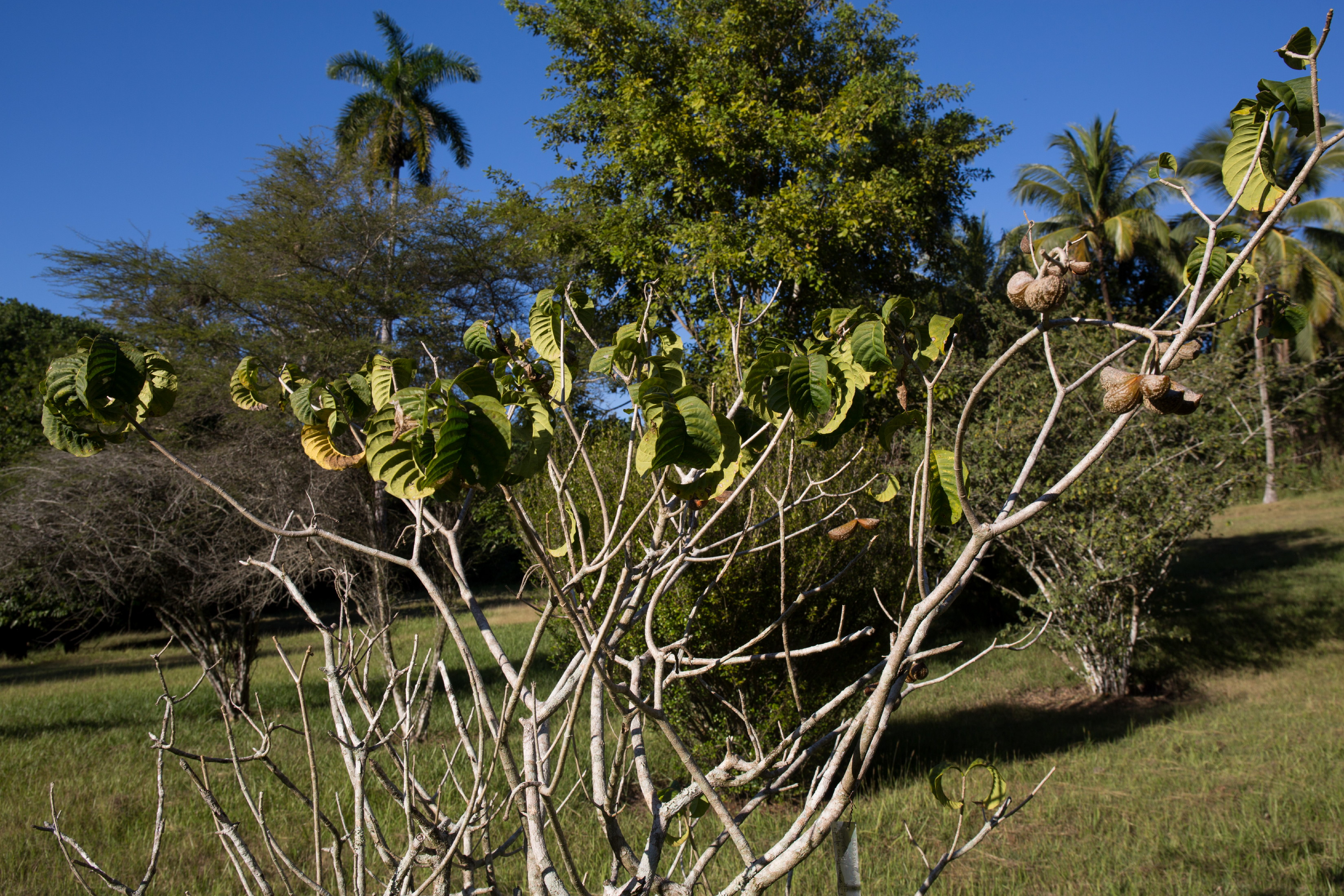
- In the Cupanicú Botanical Garden, Cuba

Conservation status
- Endangered (IUCN 3.1)

Scientific classification
- Kingdom: Plantae
- Clade: Tracheophytes
- Clade: Angiosperms
- Clade: Eudicots
- Clade: Asterids
- Order: Gentianales
- Family: Apocynaceae
- Genus: Tabernaemontana
- Species: T. apoda

Binomial name
- Tabernaemontana apoda C. Wright

= Tabernaemontana apoda =

Species of plant

Tabernaemontana apoda is a species of plant in the family Apocynaceae. It is endemic to Cuba. It is threatened by habitat loss.
