= Tabernaemontana thurstonii =

Conservation status
- Least Concern (IUCN 2.3)

Scientific classification
- Kingdom: Plantae
- Clade: Tracheophytes
- Clade: Angiosperms
- Clade: Eudicots
- Clade: Asterids
- Order: Gentianales
- Family: Apocynaceae
- Genus: Tabernaemontana
- Species: T. thurstonii

Binomial name
- Tabernaemontana thurstonii Horne ex Baker

Synonyms
- Ervatamia thurstonii (Horne ex Baker) Pichon; Pagiantha koroana Markgr. Pagiantha thurstonii (Horne ex Baker) A.C.Sm.

Species of plant

Tabernaemontana thurstonii is a species of plant in the family Apocynaceae. It is endemic to Fiji.
