= Tabernaemontana sambiranensis =

Scientific classification
- Kingdom: Plantae
- Clade: Tracheophytes
- Clade: Angiosperms
- Clade: Eudicots
- Clade: Asterids
- Order: Gentianales
- Family: Apocynaceae
- Genus: Tabernaemontana
- Species: T. sambiranensis

Binomial name
- Tabernaemontana sambiranensis Pichon

Synonyms
- Pandaca sambiranensis (Pichon) Markgr.

Species of plant

Tabernaemontana sambiranensis is a species of plant in the family Apocynaceae. It is found in northern Madagascar, off the coast of southeastern Africa.
