= Tabernaemontana ochroleuca =

Conservation status
- Vulnerable (IUCN 2.3)

Scientific classification
- Kingdom: Plantae
- Clade: Tracheophytes
- Clade: Angiosperms
- Clade: Eudicots
- Clade: Asterids
- Order: Gentianales
- Family: Apocynaceae
- Genus: Tabernaemontana
- Species: T. ochroleuca

Binomial name
- Tabernaemontana ochroleuca Urb.

Species of plant

Tabernaemontana ochroleuca is a species of plant in the family Apocynaceae. It is endemic to Jamaica.
