= Tabernaemontana grandiflora =

Scientific classification
- Kingdom: Plantae
- Clade: Tracheophytes
- Clade: Angiosperms
- Clade: Eudicots
- Clade: Asterids
- Order: Gentianales
- Family: Apocynaceae
- Genus: Tabernaemontana
- Species: T. grandiflora

Binomial name
- Tabernaemontana grandiflora Jacq.

Synonyms
- Stemmadenia grandiflora (Jacq.) Miers; Malouetia riparia (Kunth) A.DC.; Stemmadenia pauciflora Woodson; Stemmadenia pennellii Woodson; Tabernaemontana riparia Kunth

Species of flowering plant

Tabernaemontana grandiflora is a species of plants in the oleander and frangipani family Apocynaceae. It is native to Panama and tropical South America and has a conservation status of least concern.
