= Tabernaemontana debrayi =

Conservation status
- Endangered (IUCN 3.1)

Scientific classification
- Kingdom: Plantae
- Clade: Tracheophytes
- Clade: Angiosperms
- Clade: Eudicots
- Clade: Asterids
- Order: Gentianales
- Family: Apocynaceae
- Genus: Tabernaemontana
- Species: T. debrayi

Binomial name
- Tabernaemontana debrayi (Markgr.) Leeuwenb.

Synonyms
- Pandaca debrayi Markgr.

Species of plant

Tabernaemontana debrayi is a species of flowering plant in the family Apocynaceae. It is found in northern Madagascar.
