= Tabernaemontana cumata =

Conservation status
- Endangered (IUCN 2.3)

Scientific classification
- Kingdom: Plantae
- Clade: Tracheophytes
- Clade: Angiosperms
- Clade: Eudicots
- Clade: Asterids
- Order: Gentianales
- Family: Apocynaceae
- Genus: Tabernaemontana
- Species: T. cumata

Binomial name
- Tabernaemontana cumata Leeuwenberg

Species of plant

Tabernaemontana cumata is a species of plant in the family Apocynaceae. It is endemic to the State of Amazonas in northwestern Brazil. The species is listed as endangered.
