= Tabernaemontana letestui =

Scientific classification
- Kingdom: Plantae
- Clade: Tracheophytes
- Clade: Angiosperms
- Clade: Eudicots
- Clade: Asterids
- Order: Gentianales
- Family: Apocynaceae
- Genus: Tabernaemontana
- Species: T. letestui

Binomial name
- Tabernaemontana letestui (Pellegr.) Pichon

Synonyms
- Gabunia letestui Pellegr.; Protogabunia latifolia Boiteau; Protogabunia letestui (Pellegr.) Boiteau

Species of plant

Tabernaemontana letestui is a species of plant in the family Apocynaceae. It is found in West Congo and Gabon.
