= Tabernaemontana remota =

Conservation status
- Vulnerable (IUCN 2.3)

Scientific classification
- Kingdom: Plantae
- Clade: Tracheophytes
- Clade: Angiosperms
- Clade: Eudicots
- Clade: Asterids
- Order: Gentianales
- Family: Apocynaceae
- Genus: Tabernaemontana
- Species: T. remota

Binomial name
- Tabernaemontana remota Leeuwenberg

Species of plant

Tabernaemontana remota is a species of plant in the family Apocynaceae. It is found in Sulawesi in Indonesia, and also on Rossel Island (also called Yela), one of the islands in the Louisiade Archipelago, part of the Independent State of Papua New Guinea. The plant is listed as vulnerable.
