= Tabernaemontana salomonensis =

Scientific classification
- Kingdom: Plantae
- Clade: Tracheophytes
- Clade: Angiosperms
- Clade: Eudicots
- Clade: Asterids
- Order: Gentianales
- Family: Apocynaceae
- Genus: Tabernaemontana
- Species: T. salomonensis

Binomial name
- Tabernaemontana salomonensis (Markgr.) Leeuwenb.

Synonyms
- Pagiantha koroana var. salomonensis Markgr.

Species of plant

Tabernaemontana salomonensis is a species of flowering plant in the family Apocynaceae. It is found in the Solomon Islands.
