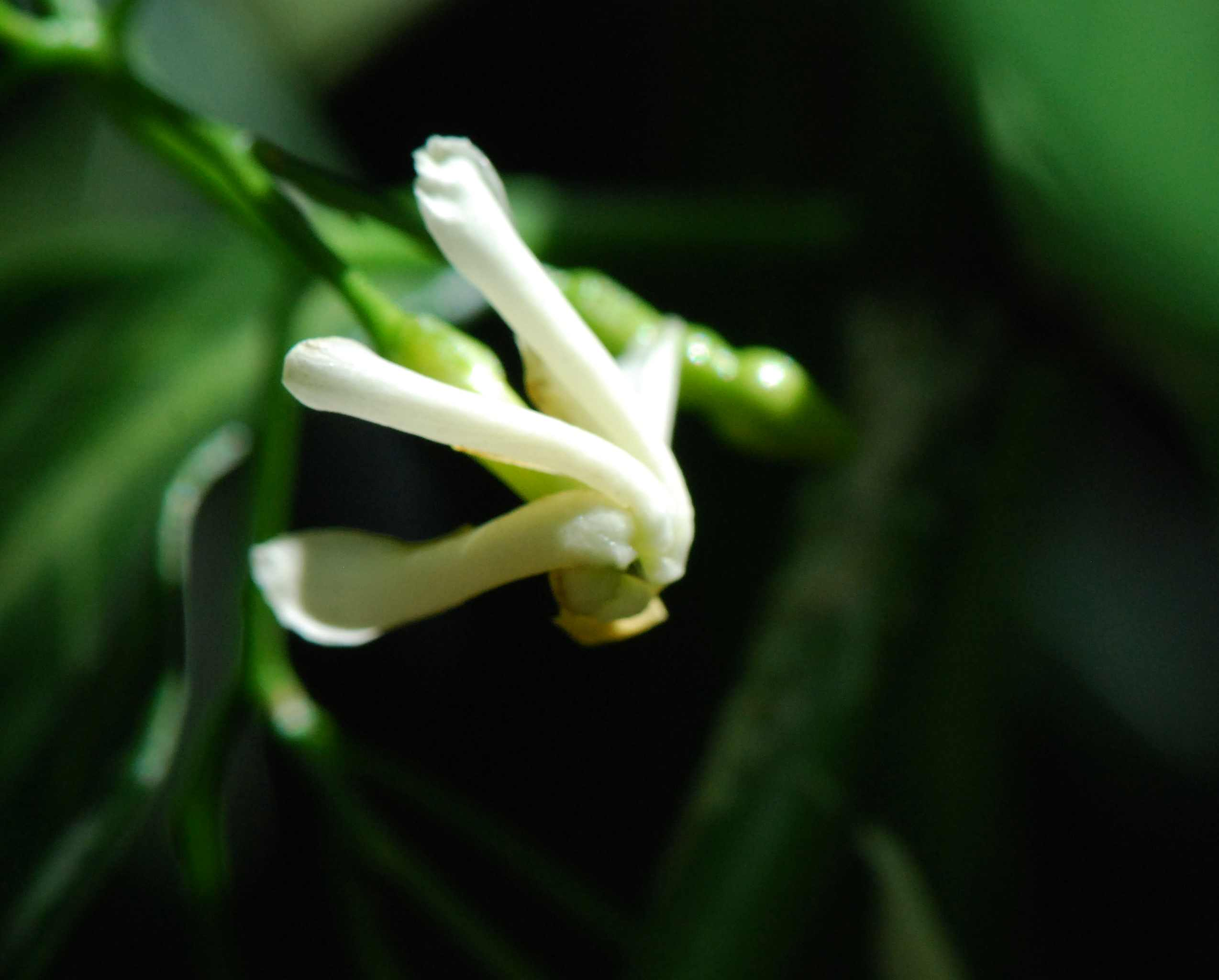

Scientific classification
- Kingdom: Plantae
- Clade: Tracheophytes
- Clade: Angiosperms
- Clade: Eudicots
- Clade: Asterids
- Order: Gentianales
- Family: Apocynaceae
- Genus: Tabernaemontana
- Species: T. citrifolia

Binomial name
- Tabernaemontana citrifolia L.

Synonyms
- Ervatamia citrifolia (L.) M.R.Almeida; Tabernaemontana citrifolia var. lanceolata (Miers) L.Allorge; Tabernaemontana lanceolata Miers; Tabernaemontana plumieri E.H.L.Krause

= Tabernaemontana citrifolia =

Species of plant

Tabernaemontana citrifolia is a species of plant in the family Apocynaceae. It is found in the West Indies.
