= Tabernaemontana coriacea =

Scientific classification
- Kingdom: Plantae
- Clade: Tracheophytes
- Clade: Angiosperms
- Clade: Eudicots
- Clade: Asterids
- Order: Gentianales
- Family: Apocynaceae
- Genus: Tabernaemontana
- Species: T. coriacea

Binomial name
- Tabernaemontana coriacea Link ex Roem. & Schult.

Synonyms
- Anacampta acutissima (Müll.Arg.) Miers; Anacampta congesta Miers; Anacampta coriacea (Link ex Roem. & Schult.) Markgr.; Anacampta pendula Markgr.; Anacampta riedelii (Müll.Arg.) Markgr.; Anacampta submollis Miers; Bonafousia brachyantha Boiteau & L.Allorge; Bonafousia coriacea (Link ex Roem. & Schult.) Boiteau & L.Allorge; Bonafousia pendula (Markgr.) Boiteau & L.Allorge; Bonafousia prancei L.Allorge; Bonafousia submollis (Mart. ex Müll.Arg.) Boiteau & L.Allorge; Taberna riedelii (Müll.Arg.) Miers; Tabernaemontana acutissima Müll.Arg.; Tabernaemontana brachyantha Woodson; Tabernaemontana congesta Benth. ex Müll.Arg.; Tabernaemontana luciliae Leeuwenb.; Tabernaemontana prancei (L.Allorge) Leeuwenb.; Tabernaemontana riedelii Müll.Arg.; Tabernaemontana rubrostriolata Mart. ex Müll.Arg.; Tabernaemontana submollis Mart. ex Müll.Arg.; Tabernaemontana ulei K.Schum.

Species of plant

Tabernaemontana coriacea is a species of plant in the family Apocynaceae. It is found in western Brazil, Peru, and Bolivia.
