= Tabernaemontana maxima =

Conservation status
- Least Concern (IUCN 3.1)

Scientific classification
- Kingdom: Plantae
- Clade: Tracheophytes
- Clade: Angiosperms
- Clade: Eudicots
- Clade: Asterids
- Order: Gentianales
- Family: Apocynaceae
- Genus: Tabernaemontana
- Species: T. maxima

Binomial name
- Tabernaemontana maxima Markgr.

Synonyms
- Homotypic Synonyms: Anacampta maxima (Markgr.) Markgr.; Bonafousia maxima (Markgr.) Boiteau & L.Allorge

Species of plant

Tabernaemontana maxima is a species of flowering plant in the family Apocynaceae. It is native to Northern Brazil, Colombia, and Venezuela.
