= Tabernaemontana ciliata =

Scientific classification
- Kingdom: Plantae
- Clade: Tracheophytes
- Clade: Angiosperms
- Clade: Eudicots
- Clade: Asterids
- Order: Gentianales
- Family: Apocynaceae
- Genus: Tabernaemontana
- Species: T. ciliata

Binomial name
- Tabernaemontana ciliata Pichon

Synonyms
- Pandaca anisophylla (Pichon) Markgr.; Pandaca callosa (Pichon) Markgr.; Pandaca ciliata (Pichon) Markgr.; Pandaca ciliata var. lanceolata Markgr.; Pandaca ciliata var. sambiranensis Markgr.; Pandaca cuneata (Pichon) Markgr.; Pandaca cuneata var. exserta Markgr.; Pandaca longissima Markgr.; Pandaca longituba (Pichon) Markgr.; Pandaca ochrascens (Pichon) Markgr.; Pandaca pichoniana Markgr.; Pandacastrum saccharatum Pichon; Tabernaemontana anisophylla Pichon; Tabernaemontana callosa Pichon; Tabernaemontana cuneata Pichon; Tabernaemontana longituba Pichon; Tabernaemontana ochrascens Pichon

Species of plant

Tabernaemontana ciliata is a species of plant in the family Apocynaceae. It is found in northern Madagascar.
