= Tabernaemontana penduliflora =

Scientific classification
- Kingdom: Plantae
- Clade: Tracheophytes
- Clade: Angiosperms
- Clade: Eudicots
- Clade: Asterids
- Order: Gentianales
- Family: Apocynaceae
- Genus: Tabernaemontana
- Species: T. penduliflora

Binomial name
- Tabernaemontana penduliflora K.Schum.

Synonyms
- Camerunia penduliflora (K.Schum.) Boiteau; Conopharyngia penduliflora (K.Schum.) Stapf

Species of plant

Tabernaemontana penduliflora is a species of plant in the family Apocynaceae. It is found in Nigeria to Zaïre.
