= Tabernaemontana chocoensis =

Scientific classification
- Kingdom: Plantae
- Clade: Tracheophytes
- Clade: Angiosperms
- Clade: Eudicots
- Clade: Asterids
- Order: Gentianales
- Family: Apocynaceae
- Genus: Tabernaemontana
- Species: T. chocoensis

Binomial name
- Tabernaemontana chocoensis (A.H. Gentry) Leeuwenb.

Synonyms
- Bonafousia chocoensis A.H.Gentry

Species of plant

Tabernaemontana chocoensis is a species of plant in the family Apocynaceae. It is found in Colombia.
