= Tabernaemontana cordata =

Conservation status
- Endangered (IUCN 3.1)

Scientific classification
- Kingdom: Plantae
- Clade: Tracheophytes
- Clade: Angiosperms
- Clade: Eudicots
- Clade: Asterids
- Order: Gentianales
- Family: Apocynaceae
- Genus: Tabernaemontana
- Species: T. cordata

Binomial name
- Tabernaemontana cordata Merr.

Species of plant

Tabernaemontana cordata is a species of plant in the family Apocynaceae. It is endemic to the Island of Mindanao in the southern Philippines. It is listed as vulnerable.
