= Tabernaemontana linkii =

Scientific classification
- Kingdom: Plantae
- Clade: Tracheophytes
- Clade: Angiosperms
- Clade: Eudicots
- Clade: Asterids
- Order: Gentianales
- Family: Apocynaceae
- Genus: Tabernaemontana
- Species: T. linkii

Binomial name
- Tabernaemontana linkii A.DC.

Synonyms
- Peschiera benthamiana (Müll.Arg.) Markgr.; Peschiera benthamiana var. myriantha (Britton ex Rusby) L.Allorge; Peschiera benthamiana var. stenantha (Markgr.) L.Allorge; Peschiera linkii (A.DC.) Miers; Peschiera multiflora Spruce ex Miers; Peschiera myriantha (Britton ex Rusby) Markgr.; Peschiera ochracea Miers; Peschiera stenantha (Markgr.) Markgr.; Tabernaemontana myriantha Britton ex Rusby; Tabernaemontana stenantha Markgr.

Species of plant

Tabernaemontana linkii is a species of plant in the family Apocynaceae. It is found in northern and western South America.
