= Tabernaemontana phymata =

Scientific classification
- Kingdom: Plantae
- Clade: Tracheophytes
- Clade: Angiosperms
- Clade: Eudicots
- Clade: Asterids
- Order: Gentianales
- Family: Apocynaceae
- Genus: Tabernaemontana
- Species: T. phymata

Binomial name
- Tabernaemontana phymata Leeuwenb.

Species of plant

Tabernaemontana phymata is a species of plant in the family Apocynaceae. It is found in northern Madagascar.
