= Tabernaemontana attenuata =

Conservation status
- Least Concern (IUCN 3.1)

Scientific classification
- Kingdom: Plantae
- Clade: Tracheophytes
- Clade: Angiosperms
- Clade: Eudicots
- Clade: Asterids
- Order: Gentianales
- Family: Apocynaceae
- Genus: Tabernaemontana
- Species: T. attenuata

Binomial name
- Tabernaemontana attenuata (Miers) Urb.

Synonyms
- Homotypic Synonyms: Anartia attenuata (Miers) Markgr.; Bonafousia attenuata Miers

Species of plant

Tabernaemontana attenuata is a species of flowering plant in the family Apocynaceae. It is native to French Guiana, Suriname, Trinidad and Tobago, and Venezuela.
