= Tabernaemontana tomentosa =

Conservation status
- Least Concern (IUCN 3.1)

Scientific classification
- Kingdom: Plantae
- Clade: Tracheophytes
- Clade: Angiosperms
- Clade: Eudicots
- Clade: Asterids
- Order: Gentianales
- Family: Apocynaceae
- Genus: Tabernaemontana
- Species: T. tomentosa

Binomial name
- Tabernaemontana tomentosa (Greenm.) A.O.Simões & M.E.Endress

Species of plant

Tabernaemontana tomentosa is a species of plant in the family Apocynaceae. It is endemic to Mexico.
