= Tabernaemontana contorta =

Scientific classification
- Kingdom: Plantae
- Clade: Tracheophytes
- Clade: Angiosperms
- Clade: Eudicots
- Clade: Asterids
- Order: Gentianales
- Family: Apocynaceae
- Genus: Tabernaemontana
- Species: T. contorta

Binomial name
- Tabernaemontana contorta Stapf

Synonyms
- Conopharyngia contorta (Stapf) Stapf; Sarcopharyngia contorta (Stapf) Boiteau

Species of plant

Tabernaemontana contorta is a species of plant in the family Apocynaceae. It is found in Cameroon.
