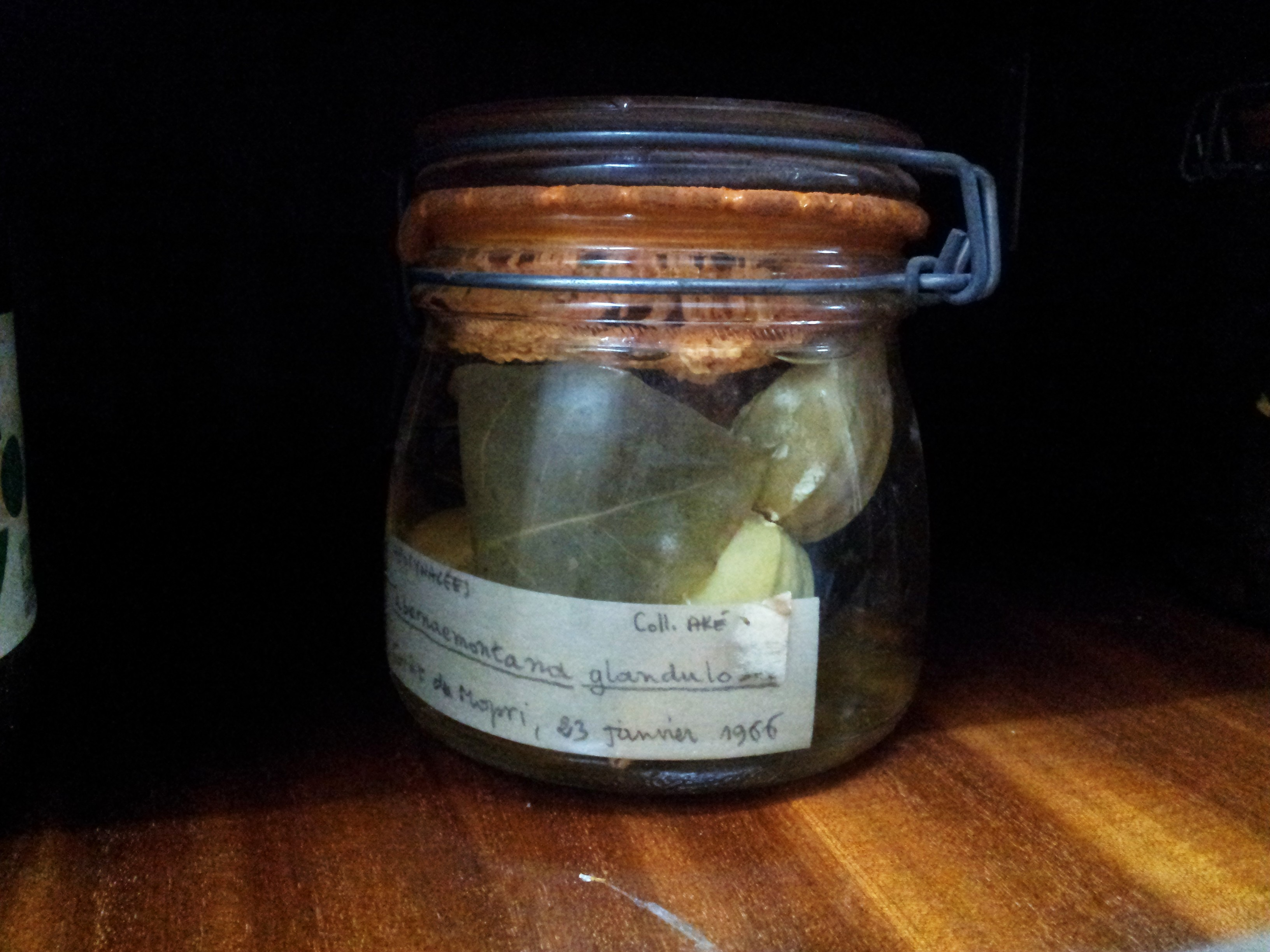

Scientific classification
- Kingdom: Plantae
- Clade: Tracheophytes
- Clade: Angiosperms
- Clade: Eudicots
- Clade: Asterids
- Order: Gentianales
- Family: Apocynaceae
- Genus: Tabernaemontana
- Species: T. glandulosa

Binomial name
- Tabernaemontana glandulosa (Stapf) Pichon

Synonyms
- Gabunia glandulosa Stapf

= Tabernaemontana glandulosa =

Species of plant

Tabernaemontana glandulosa is a species of plant in the family Apocynaceae. It is found from Guinea to West Congo.
