= Tabernaemontana retusa =

Scientific classification
- Kingdom: Plantae
- Clade: Tracheophytes
- Clade: Angiosperms
- Clade: Eudicots
- Clade: Asterids
- Order: Gentianales
- Family: Apocynaceae
- Genus: Tabernaemontana
- Species: T. retusa

Binomial name
- Tabernaemontana retusa (Lam.) Pichon

Synonyms
- Conopharyngia retusa (Lam.) G.Don; Pandaca retusa (Lam.) Markgr.; Plumeria retusa Lam.; Tabernaemontana noronhiana Bojer ex A.DC.; Tabernaemontana retusa (Lam.) Palacky

Species of plant

Tabernaemontana retusa is a species of plant in the family Apocynaceae. It is found in Madagascar.
