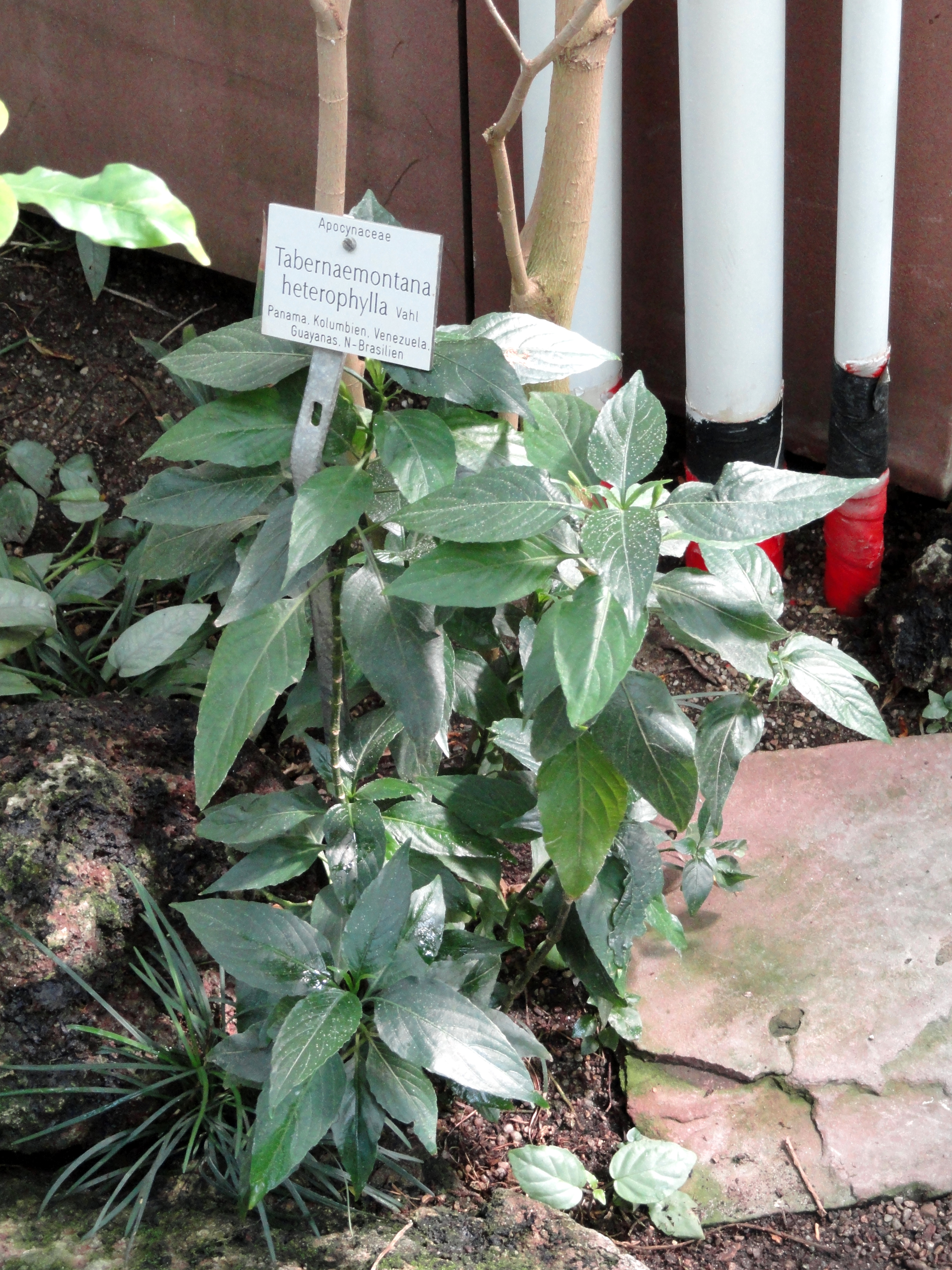

Scientific classification
- Kingdom: Plantae
- Clade: Tracheophytes
- Clade: Angiosperms
- Clade: Eudicots
- Clade: Asterids
- Order: Gentianales
- Family: Apocynaceae
- Genus: Tabernaemontana
- Species: T. heterophylla

Binomial name
- Tabernaemontana heterophylla Vahl

Synonyms
- Peschiera cuspidata Miers; Peschiera diversifolia Miq.; Peschiera heterophylla (Vahl) Miers; Peschiera laevifructa L.Allorge; Peschiera stenoloba (Müll.Arg.) Miers; Peschiera tenuiflora Poepp.; Stenosolen eggersii Markgr.; Stenosolen eggersii f. glabra Markgr.; Stenosolen eggersii f. pubescens Markgr.; Stenosolen grandifolius Markgr.; Stenosolen heterophyllus (Vahl) Markgr.; Stenosolen holothuria Markgr. ex A.H.Gentry; Stenosolen stenolobus (Müll.Arg.) Markgr.; Tabernaemontana holothuria (Markgr. ex A.H.Gentry) Leeuwenb.; Tabernaemontana stenoloba Müll.Arg.; Tabernaemontana tenuiflora (Poepp.) Müll.Arg.; Tabernaemontana urguiculata Rusby

= Tabernaemontana heterophylla =

Species of plant

Tabernaemontana heterophylla is a species of plant in the family Apocynaceae. It is found in southeastern Central America, and northern and central South America.
