= Tabernaemontana sphaerocarpa =

Scientific classification
- Kingdom: Plantae
- Clade: Tracheophytes
- Clade: Angiosperms
- Clade: Eudicots
- Clade: Asterids
- Order: Gentianales
- Family: Apocynaceae
- Genus: Tabernaemontana
- Species: T. sphaerocarpa

Binomial name
- Tabernaemontana sphaerocarpa Blume

Synonyms
- Ervatamia sphaerocarpa (Blume) Burkill; Pagiantha fagraeoides (Miq.) Markgr.; Pagiantha sphaerocarpa (Blume) Markgr.; Tabernaemontana fagraeoides Miq.; Tabernaemontana javanica Miq.

Species of plant

Tabernaemontana sphaerocarpa is a species of plant in the family Apocynaceae. It is found in Java to Maluku.
