= Tabernaemontana psorocarpa =

Scientific classification
- Kingdom: Plantae
- Clade: Tracheophytes
- Clade: Angiosperms
- Clade: Eudicots
- Clade: Asterids
- Order: Gentianales
- Family: Apocynaceae
- Genus: Tabernaemontana
- Species: T. psorocarpa

Binomial name
- Tabernaemontana psorocarpa (Pierre ex Stapf) Pichon

Synonyms
- Gabunia psorocarpa Pierre ex Stapf

Species of plant

Tabernaemontana psorocarpa is a species of plant in the family Apocynaceae. It is found in West Africa.
