= Tabernaemontana inconspicua =

Scientific classification
- Kingdom: Plantae
- Clade: Tracheophytes
- Clade: Angiosperms
- Clade: Eudicots
- Clade: Asterids
- Order: Gentianales
- Family: Apocynaceae
- Genus: Tabernaemontana
- Species: T. inconspicua

Binomial name
- Tabernaemontana inconspicua Stapf

Synonyms
- Pterotaberna inconspicua (Stapf) Stapf; Tabernaemontana trialata Pierre ex Stapf

Species of plant

Tabernaemontana inconspicua is a species of plant in the family Apocynaceae. It is found in Cameroon to Angola.
