= Tabernaemontana rupicola =

Conservation status
- Least Concern (IUCN 3.1)

Scientific classification
- Kingdom: Plantae
- Clade: Tracheophytes
- Clade: Angiosperms
- Clade: Eudicots
- Clade: Asterids
- Order: Gentianales
- Family: Apocynaceae
- Genus: Tabernaemontana
- Species: T. rupicola

Binomial name
- Tabernaemontana rupicola Benth.

Synonyms
- Anacampta rupicola (Benth.) Markgr.; Bonafousia polyneura Miers; Bonafousia rariflora Miers; Bonafousia rupicola (Benth.) Miers; Bonafousia rupicola var. oblongifolia (Müll. Arg.) L. Allorge; Bonafousia rupicola var. versicolor (Woodson) L.Allorge; Tabernaemontana rupicola var. oblongifolia Müll.Arg.; Tabernaemontana rupicola var. poeppigii Müll.Arg.; Tabernaemontana rupicola var. sprucei Müll.Arg.; Tabernaemontana sessilifolia Klotzsch; Tabernaemontana versicolor Woodson

Species of plant

Tabernaemontana rupicola is a species of plant in the family Apocynaceae.

The species is a plant native to Brazil, with confirmed occurrences in the northern states (Amazonas, Pará, Rondônia, and Roraima), within the Amazonian phytogeographic domain. It predominantly inhabits igapó and várzea forests, adapting to the floodable environments characteristic of this region. This is a widely distributed species with a range extending to parts of Venezuela, Colombia, Guyana, French Guiana and Suriname.

== Alkaloids ==
Voacristine pseudoindoxyl

Rupicoline (Voaluteine) & Montanine (A) are two alkaloids present in the leaves of Tabernaemontana rupicola.
