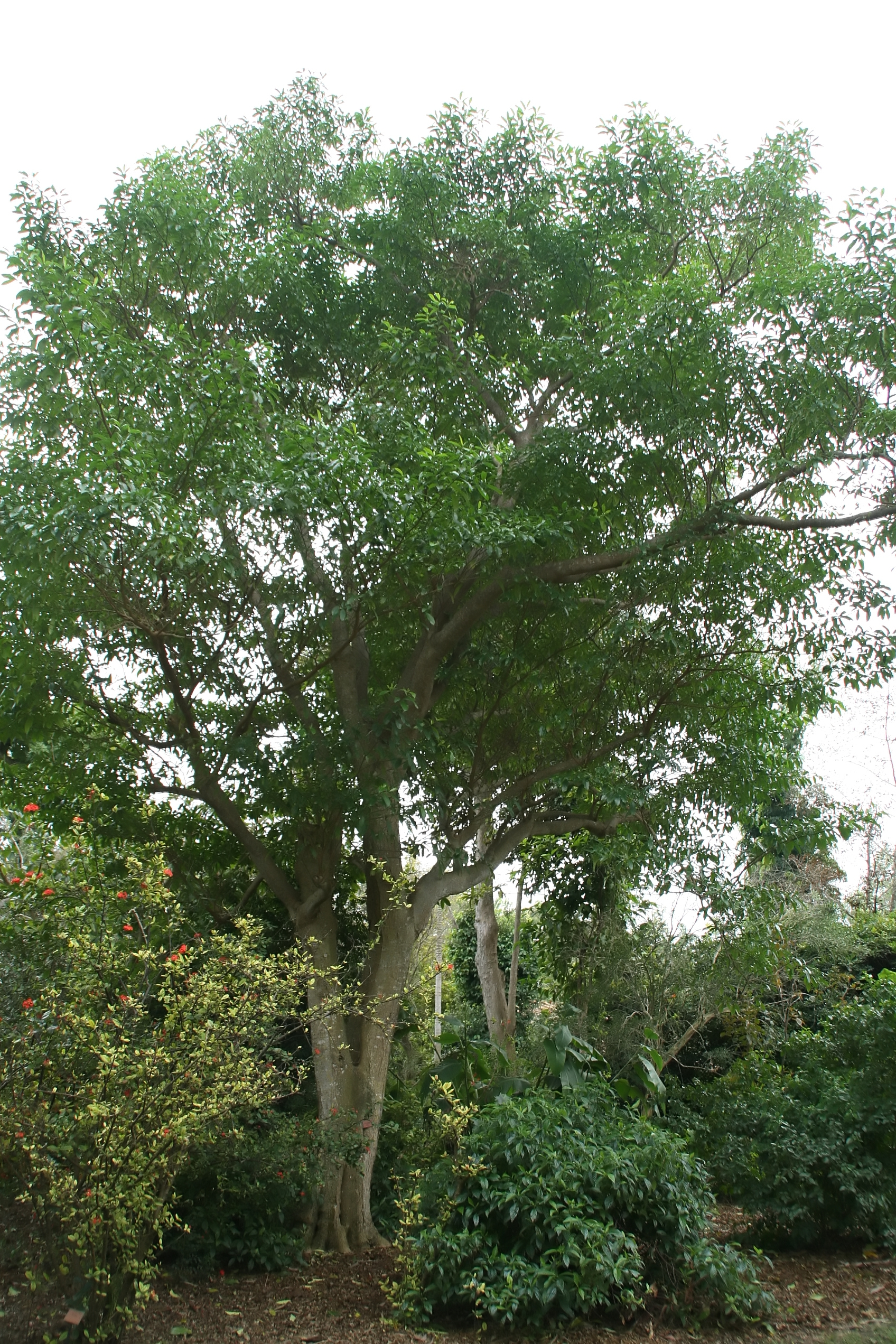

Conservation status
- Least Concern (IUCN 3.1)

Scientific classification
- Kingdom: Plantae
- Clade: Tracheophytes
- Clade: Angiosperms
- Clade: Eudicots
- Clade: Asterids
- Order: Gentianales
- Family: Apocynaceae
- Genus: Tabernaemontana
- Species: T. arborea

Binomial name
- Tabernaemontana arborea Rose

Synonyms
- Peschiera arborea (Rose) Markgr.; Peschiera schippii (Standl.) Markgr.; Tabernaemontana schippii Standl.

= Tabernaemontana arborea =

Species of plant

Tabernaemontana arborea is a species of plant in the family Apocynaceae. It is native to southern Mexico, Central America, and Colombia.
