= Tabernaemontana eglandulosa =

Scientific classification
- Kingdom: Plantae
- Clade: Tracheophytes
- Clade: Angiosperms
- Clade: Eudicots
- Clade: Asterids
- Order: Gentianales
- Family: Apocynaceae
- Genus: Tabernaemontana
- Species: T. eglandulosa

Binomial name
- Tabernaemontana eglandulosa Stapf

Synonyms
- Gabunia brachypoda (K.Schum.) Stapf; Gabunia crispiflora (K.Schum.) Stapf; Gabunia eglandulosa (Stapf) Stapf; Gabunia eglandulosa var. macrocalyx Stapf; Gabunia latifolia Stapf; Gabunia longiflora Stapf; Gabunia macrocalyx (Stapf) Boiteau; Gabunia macrocarpa Boiteau; Tabernaemontana brachypoda K.Schum.; Tabernaemontana chartacea Pichon; Tabernaemontana crispiflora K.Schum.; Tabernaemontana latifolia (Stapf) Pichon

Species of plant

Tabernaemontana eglandulosa is a species of plant in the family Apocynaceae. It is found in Benin to Angola.
