= Tabernaemontana bouquetii =

Scientific classification
- Kingdom: Plantae
- Clade: Tracheophytes
- Clade: Angiosperms
- Clade: Eudicots
- Clade: Asterids
- Order: Gentianales
- Family: Apocynaceae
- Genus: Tabernaemontana
- Species: T. bouquetii

Binomial name
- Tabernaemontana bouquetii (Boiteau) Leeuwenb.

Synonyms
- Camerunia bouquetii Boiteau

Species of plant

Tabernaemontana bouquetii is a species of flowering plant in the family Apocynaceae. It is found in Congo, and Gabon.
