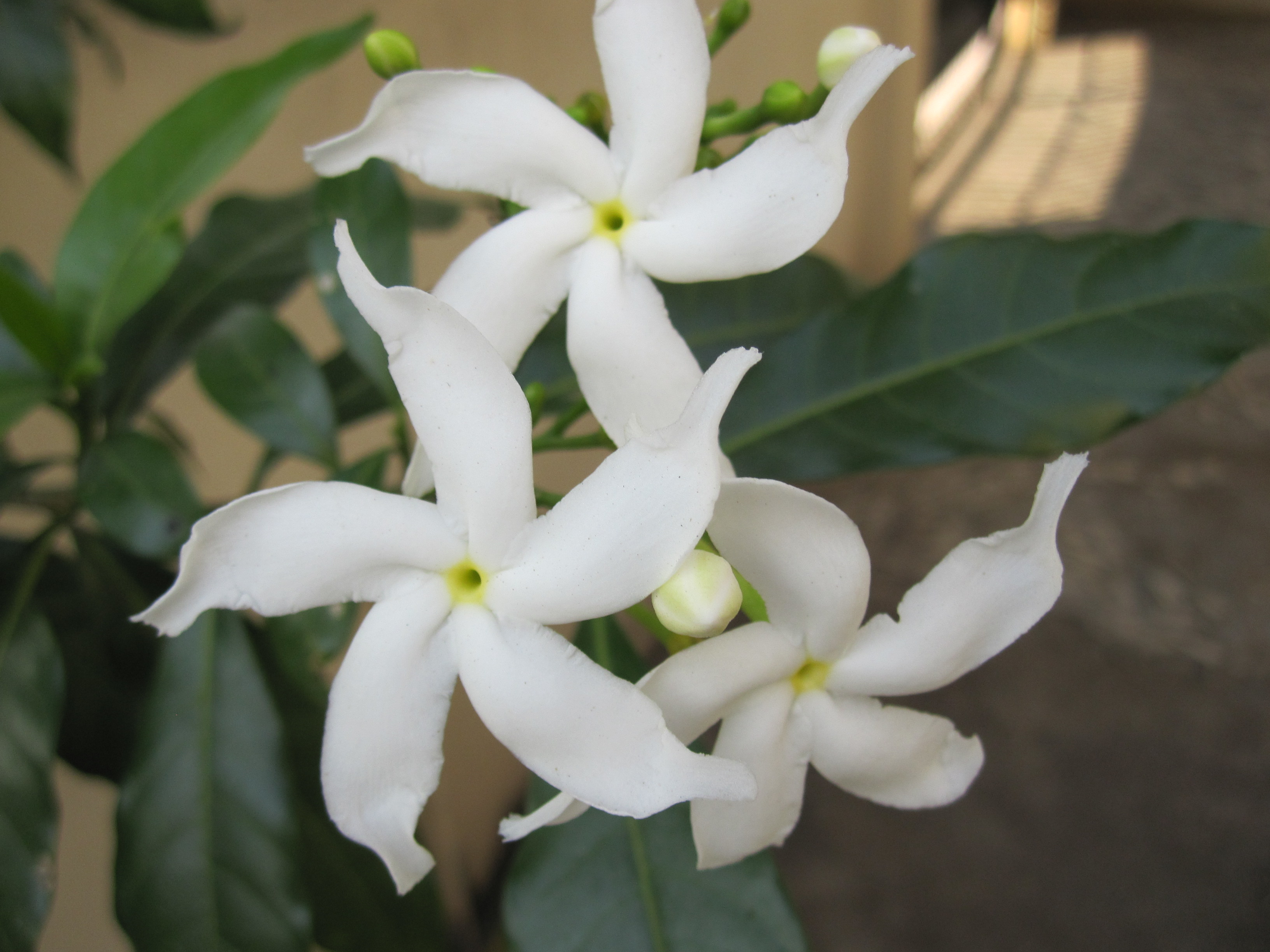

Conservation status
- Vulnerable (IUCN 3.1)

Scientific classification
- Kingdom: Plantae
- Clade: Tracheophytes
- Clade: Angiosperms
- Clade: Eudicots
- Clade: Asterids
- Order: Gentianales
- Family: Apocynaceae
- Genus: Tabernaemontana
- Species: T. hallei

Binomial name
- Tabernaemontana hallei (Boiteau) Leeuwenb.

Synonyms
- Gabunia hallei Boiteau

= Tabernaemontana hallei =

Species of plant

Tabernaemontana hallei is a species of flowering plant in the family Apocynaceae. It is found in Cameroon and Gabon.
