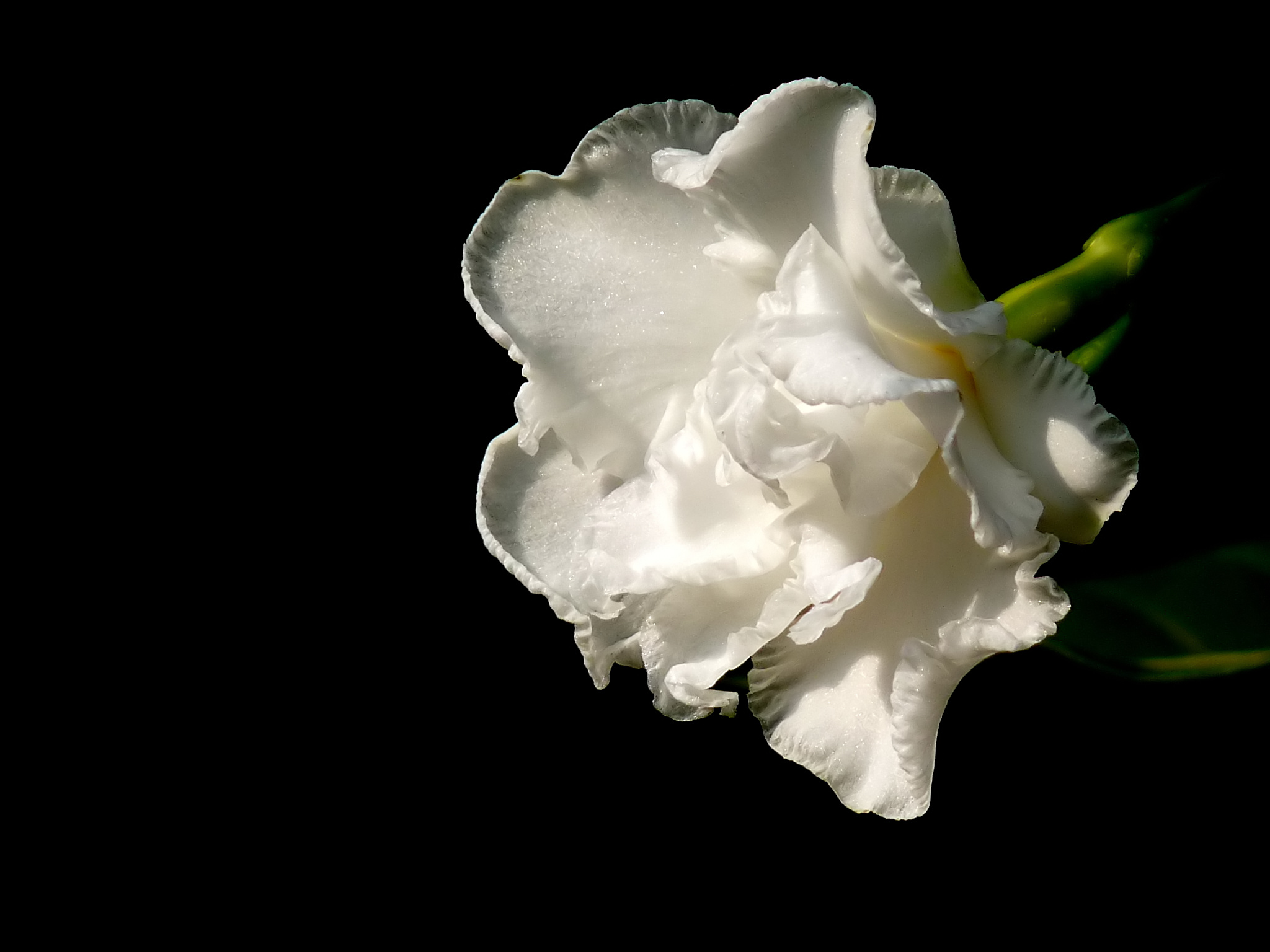
- Tabernaemontana divaricata 'Flore Pleno'

Scientific classification
- Kingdom: Plantae
- Clade: Embryophytes
- Clade: Tracheophytes
- Clade: Spermatophytes
- Clade: Angiosperms
- Clade: Eudicots
- Clade: Asterids
- Order: Gentianales
- Family: Apocynaceae
- Subfamily: Rauvolfioideae
- Tribe: Tabernaemontaneae
- Subtribe: Tabernaemontaninae
- Genus: Tabernaemontana; Plum. ex L.

Synonyms
- 35 synonyms: Anabata Willd. ex Spreng.; Anacampta Miers; Anartia Miers; Bonafousia A.DC.; Camerunia (Pichon) Boiteau; Capuronetta Markgr.; Clerkia Neck.; Codonemma Miers; Conopharyngia G.Don; Domkeocarpa Markgr.; Ervatamia (A.DC.) Stapf; Gabunia K.Schum.; Hazunta Pichon; Leptopharyngia (Stapf) Boiteau; Merizadenia Miers; Muntafara Pichon; Ochronerium Baill.; Odontostigma A.Rich.; Oistanthera Markgr.; Pagiantha Markgr.; Pandaca Noronha ex Thouars; Pandacastrum Pichon; Peschiera A.DC.; Phrissocarpus Miers; Protogabunia Boiteau; Pterotaberna Stapf; Quadricasaea Woodson; Reichardia Dennst.; Rejoua Gaudich.; Sarcopharyngia (Stapf) Boiteau; Stemmadenia Benth.; Stenosolen (Müll.Arg.) Markgr.; Taberna Miers; Testudipes Markgr.; Woytkowskia Woodson

= Tabernaemontana =

Genus of plants

Tabernaemontana is a genus of flowering plants in the family Apocynaceae. It has a pan-tropical distribution, found in Asia, Africa, Australia, North America, South America, and islands of the Indian and Pacific Oceans. These plants are evergreen shrubs and small trees growing to 1–15 m tall. The leaves are arranged in opposite pairs, 3–25 cm long, with milky sap; hence it is one of the diverse plant genera commonly called "milkwood". The flowers are fragrant, white, 1–5 cm in diameter.

The cultivar T. divaricata cv. 'Plena', with doubled-petaled flowers, is a popular houseplant.

Some members of the genus Tabernaemontana are used as additives to some versions of the psychedelic drink ayahuasca; the genus is known to contain ibogaine (e.g. in bëcchëte, T. undulata), conolidine (present in minor concentration in T. divaricata) and voacangine (T. alba, T. arborea, T. africana). Because of presence of coronaridine and voacangine in Mexican Tabernaemontana species, those plant could be used in economic production of anti-addictive alkaloids especially ibogaine and ibogamine. T. sananho preparations are used in native medicine to treat eye injuries and as an anxiolytic, and T. heterophylla is used to treat dementia in the elderly. Conolidine may be developed as a new class of pain killer. Caterpillars of the oleander hawk-moth (Daphnis nerii) have been found to feed on the pinwheelflower (T. divaricata).

== Taxonomy ==
The genus was described by Carl Linnaeus and published in Species Plantarum 1: 210–211 in 1753. The type species is T. citrifolia.

=== Etymology ===
The genus name commemorates the "father of German botany" Jakob Theodor von Bergzabern, a.k.a. Jacobus Theodorus Tabernaemontanus, Tabernaemontanus being a compressed form of the original Medieval Latin name (Tabernae Montanus) of the botanist's home town of Bergzabern - both the Latin and the German forms of the town's name meaning "tavern(s) in the mountains".

== Species ==
As of May 2025, Plants of the World Online accepts the following 126 species:

- Tabernaemontana abbreviata (J.F.Morales) A.O.Simões & M.E.Endress
- Tabernaemontana africana Hook.
- Tabernaemontana alba Mill.
- Tabernaemontana alfaroi Donn.Sm.
- Tabernaemontana allenii (Woodson) A.O.Simões & M.E.Endress
- Tabernaemontana alternifolia L.
- Tabernaemontana amplifolia L.Allorge
- Tabernaemontana amygdalifolia Jacq.
- Tabernaemontana angulata Mart. ex Müll.Arg.
- Tabernaemontana antheonycta Leeuwenb.
- Tabernaemontana apoda C.Wright
- Tabernaemontana arborea Rose
- Tabernaemontana attenuata (Miers) Urb.
- Tabernaemontana aurantiaca Gaudich.
- Tabernaemontana bouquetii (Boiteau) Leeuwenb.
- Tabernaemontana bovina Lour.
- Tabernaemontana brachyantha Stapf
- Tabernaemontana brachypoda K.Schum.
- Tabernaemontana brasiliensis (Leeuwenb.) A.O.Simões & M.E.Endress
- Tabernaemontana bufalina Lour.
- Tabernaemontana calcarea Pichon
- Tabernaemontana capuronii Leeuwenb.
- Tabernaemontana catharinensis A.DC.
- Tabernaemontana cerea (Woodson) Leeuwenb.
- Tabernaemontana cerifera Pancher & Sebert
- Tabernaemontana chamelensis L.O.Alvarado & Lozada-Pérez
- Tabernaemontana chocoensis (A.H.Gentry) Leeuwenb.
- Tabernaemontana ciliata Pichon
- Tabernaemontana citrifolia L.
- Tabernaemontana coffeoides Bojer ex A.DC.
- Tabernaemontana columbiensis (L.Allorge) Leeuwenb.
- Tabernaemontana contorta Stapf
- Tabernaemontana cordata Merr.
- Tabernaemontana coriacea Link ex Roem. & Schult.
- Tabernaemontana corymbosa Roxb. ex Wall.
- Tabernaemontana crassa Benth.
- Tabernaemontana crassifolia Pichon
- Tabernaemontana crispiflora K.Schum.
- Tabernaemontana cumata Leeuwenb.
- Tabernaemontana cuspidata Rusby
- Tabernaemontana cymosa Jacq.
- Tabernaemontana debrayi (Markgr.) Leeuwenb.
- Tabernaemontana dichotoma Roxb. ex Wall.
- Tabernaemontana disticha A.DC.
- Tabernaemontana divaricata (L.) R.Br. ex Roem. & Schult.
- Tabernaemontana donnell-smithii Rose
- Tabernaemontana eglandulosa Stapf
- Tabernaemontana elegans Stapf
- Tabernaemontana eubracteata (Woodson) A.O.Simões & M.E.Endress
- Tabernaemontana eusepala Aug.DC.
- Tabernaemontana eusepaloides (Markgr.) Leeuwenb.
- Tabernaemontana flavicans Roem. & Schult.
- Tabernaemontana fragrans Jongkind
- Tabernaemontana gamblei Subr. & A.N.Henry
- Tabernaemontana glabra (Benth.) A.O.Simões & M.E.Endress
- Tabernaemontana glandulosa (Stapf) Pichon
- Tabernaemontana grandiflora Jacq.
- Tabernaemontana granulosa Pit.
- Tabernaemontana hallei (Boiteau) Leeuwenb.
- Tabernaemontana hannae (M.Méndez & J.F.Morales) A.O.Simões & M.E.Endress
- Tabernaemontana heterophylla Vahl
- Tabernaemontana humblotii (Baill.) Pichon
- Tabernaemontana hystrix Steud.
- Tabernaemontana inconspicua Stapf
- Tabernaemontana laeta Mart.
- Tabernaemontana lagenaria Leeuwenb.
- Tabernaemontana laurifolia L.
- Tabernaemontana leeuwenbergiana J.F.Morales
- Tabernaemontana letestui (Pellegr.) Pichon
- Tabernaemontana linkii A.DC.
- Tabernaemontana litoralis Kunth
- Tabernaemontana longipes Donn.Sm.
- Tabernaemontana lorifera (Miers) Leeuwenb.
- Tabernaemontana macrocalyx Müll.Arg.
- Tabernaemontana macrocarpa Jack
- Tabernaemontana markgrafiana J.F.Macbr.
- Tabernaemontana maxima Markgr.
- Tabernaemontana mixtecana L.O.Alvarado & Juárez-Jaimes
- Tabernaemontana mocquerysi Aug.DC.
- Tabernaemontana muricata Link ex Roem. & Schult.
- Tabernaemontana oaxacana (L.O.Alvarado) A.O.Simões & M.E.Endress
- Tabernaemontana ochoterenae L.O.Alvarado & S.Islas
- Tabernaemontana ochroleuca Urb.
- Tabernaemontana odoratissima (Stapf) Leeuwenb.
- Tabernaemontana oppositifolia (Spreng.) Urb.
- Tabernaemontana ovalifolia Urb.
- Tabernaemontana pachysiphon Stapf
- Tabernaemontana palustris Markgr.
- Tabernaemontana panamensis (Markgr., Boiteau & L.Allorge) Leeuwenb.
- Tabernaemontana pandacaqui Poir.
- Tabernaemontana pauciflora Blume
- Tabernaemontana pauli (Leeuwenb.) A.O.Simões & M.E.Endress
- Tabernaemontana peduncularis Wall.
- Tabernaemontana penduliflora K.Schum.
- Tabernaemontana persicariifolia Jacq.
- Tabernaemontana peschiera ined.
- Tabernaemontana phymata Leeuwenb.
- Tabernaemontana polyneura (King & Gamble) D.J.Middleton
- Tabernaemontana psorocarpa (Pierre ex Stapf) Pichon
- Tabernaemontana remota Leeuwenb.
- Tabernaemontana retusa (Lam.) Pichon
- Tabernaemontana riverae L.O.Alvarado & V.Saynes
- Tabernaemontana robinsonii (Woodson) A.O.Simões & M.E.Endress
- Tabernaemontana rostrata Wall.
- Tabernaemontana rupicola Benth.
- Tabernaemontana salomonensis (Markgr.) Leeuwenb.
- Tabernaemontana salzmannii A.DC.
- Tabernaemontana sambiranensis Pichon
- Tabernaemontana sananho Ruiz & Pav.
- Tabernaemontana sessilifolia Baker
- Tabernaemontana simulans (J.F.Morales & Q.Jiménez) A.O.Simões & M.E.Endress
- Tabernaemontana siphilitica (L.f.) Leeuwenb.
- Tabernaemontana solanifolia A.DC.
- Tabernaemontana sphaerocarpa Blume
- Tabernaemontana stapfiana Britten
- Tabernaemontana stellata Pichon
- Tabernaemontana stenoptera (Leeuwenb.) A.O.Simões & M.E.Endress
- Tabernaemontana stenosiphon Stapf
- Tabernaemontana ternifolia D.J.Middleton
- Tabernaemontana thurstonii Horne ex Baker
- Tabernaemontana tomentosa (Greenm.) A.O.Simões & M.E.Endress
- Tabernaemontana undulata Vahl
- Tabernaemontana vanheurckii Müll.Arg.
- Tabernaemontana ventricosa Hochst. ex A.DC.
- Tabernaemontana venusta (J.F.Morales) A.O.Simões & M.E.Endress
- Tabernaemontana wullschlaegelii Griseb.

== Gallery ==
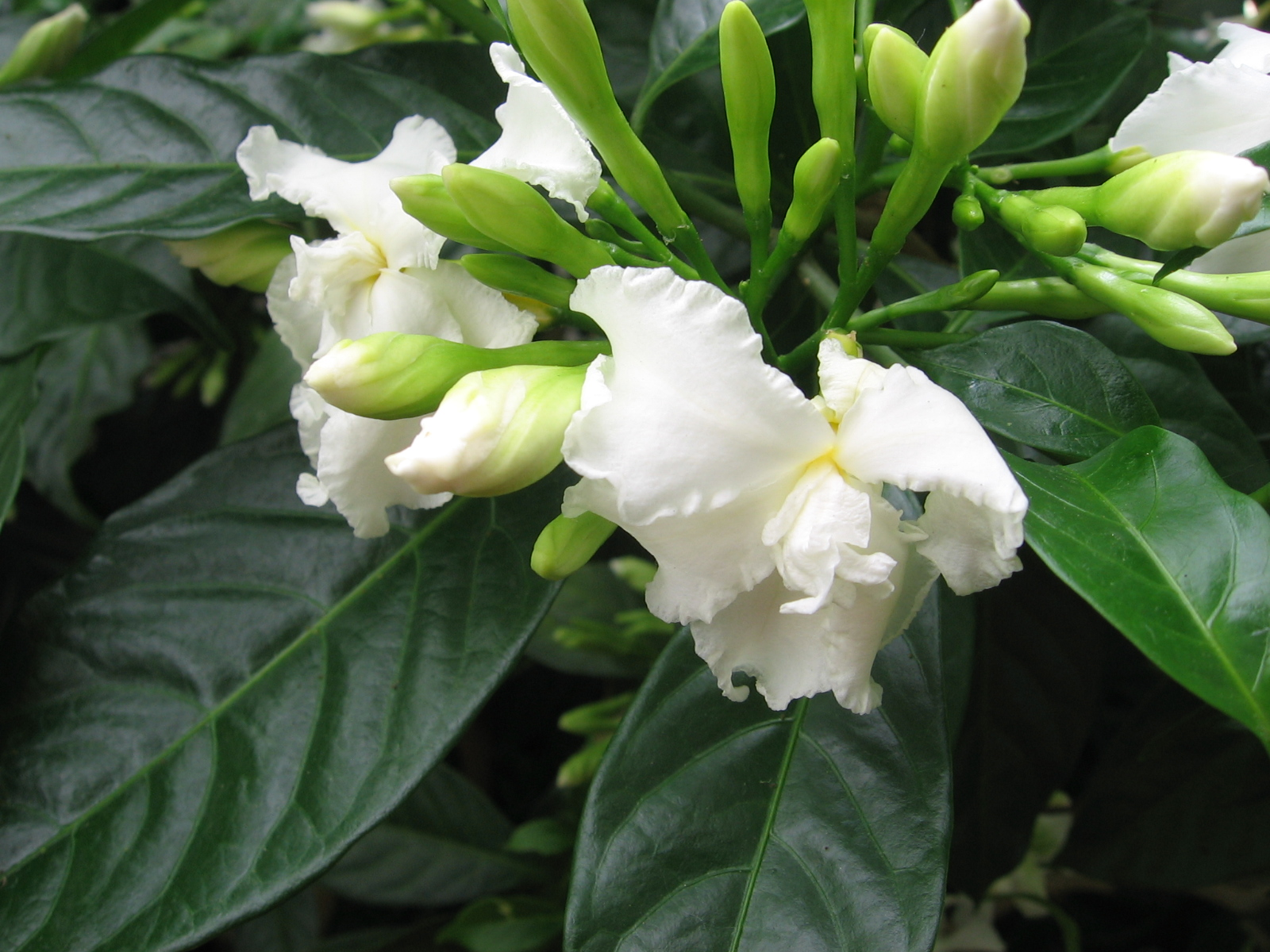
Ornamental pinwheelflower (T. divaricata) cv. 'Plena'

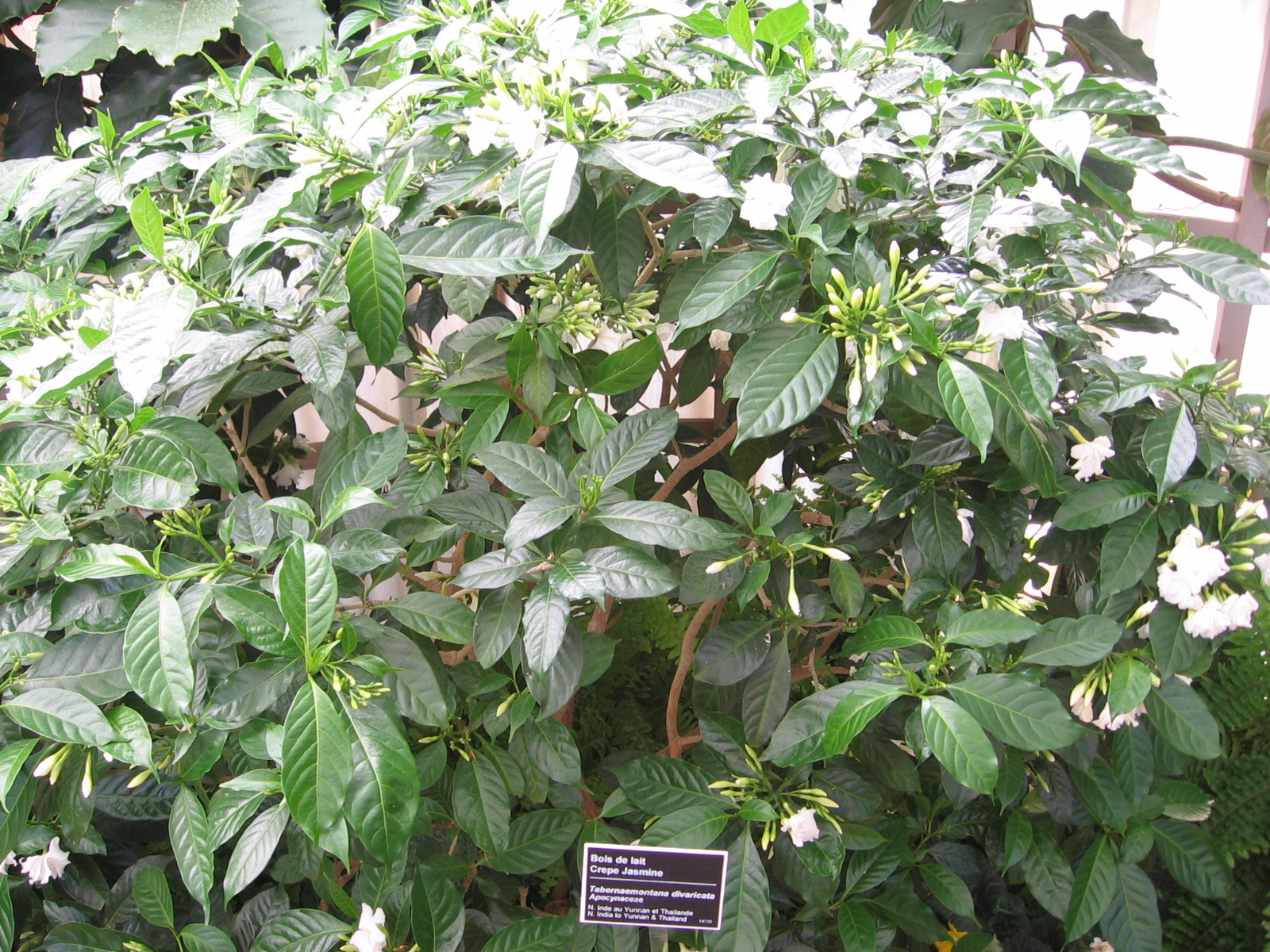
Habit of T. divaricata

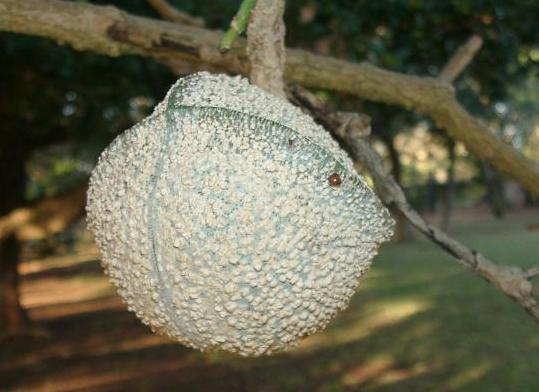
T. elegans (toad tree) : undehisced fruit

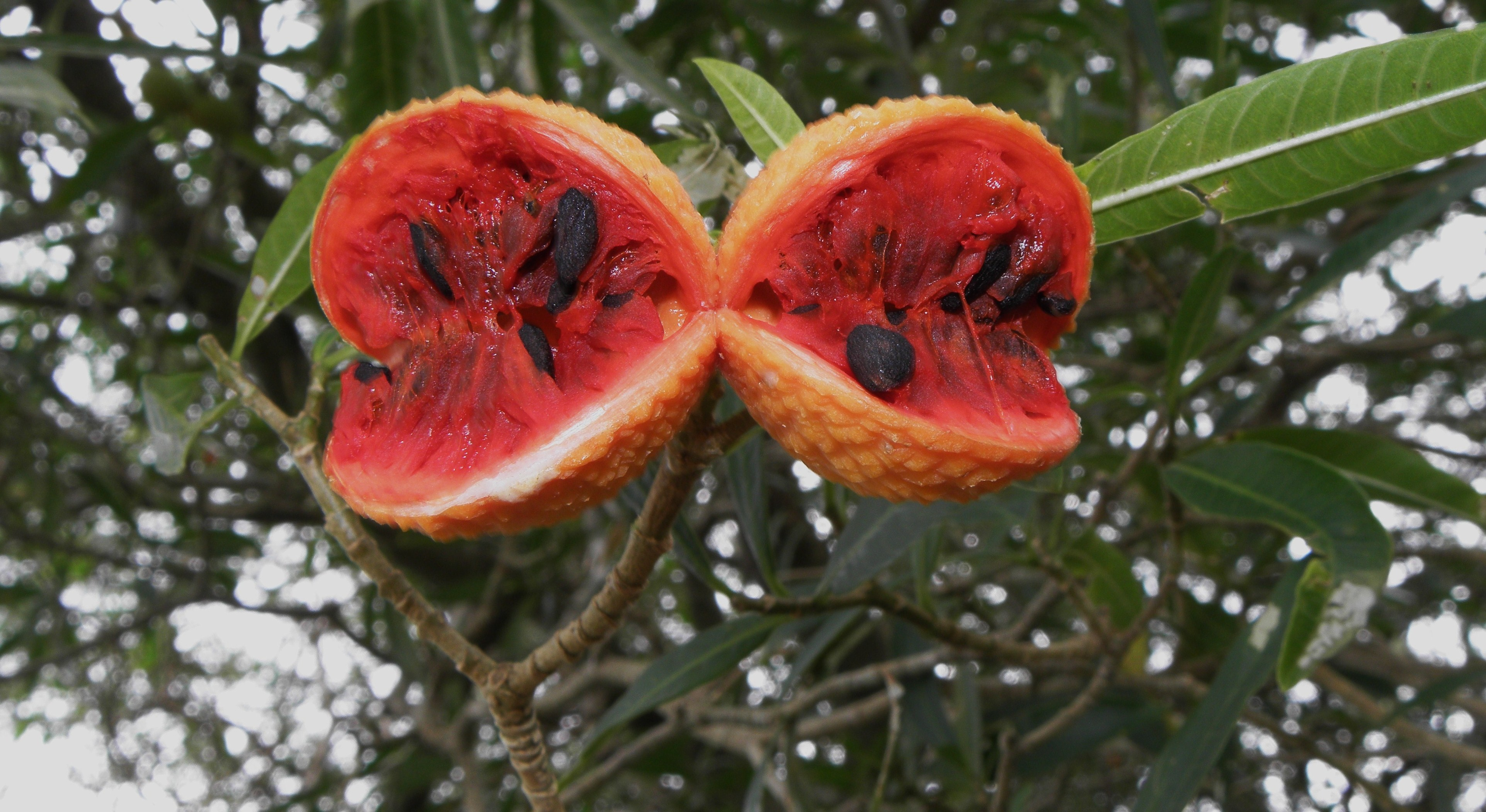
T. catharinensis: dehiscence of paired, ripe fruits, revealing black seeds in red pulp.

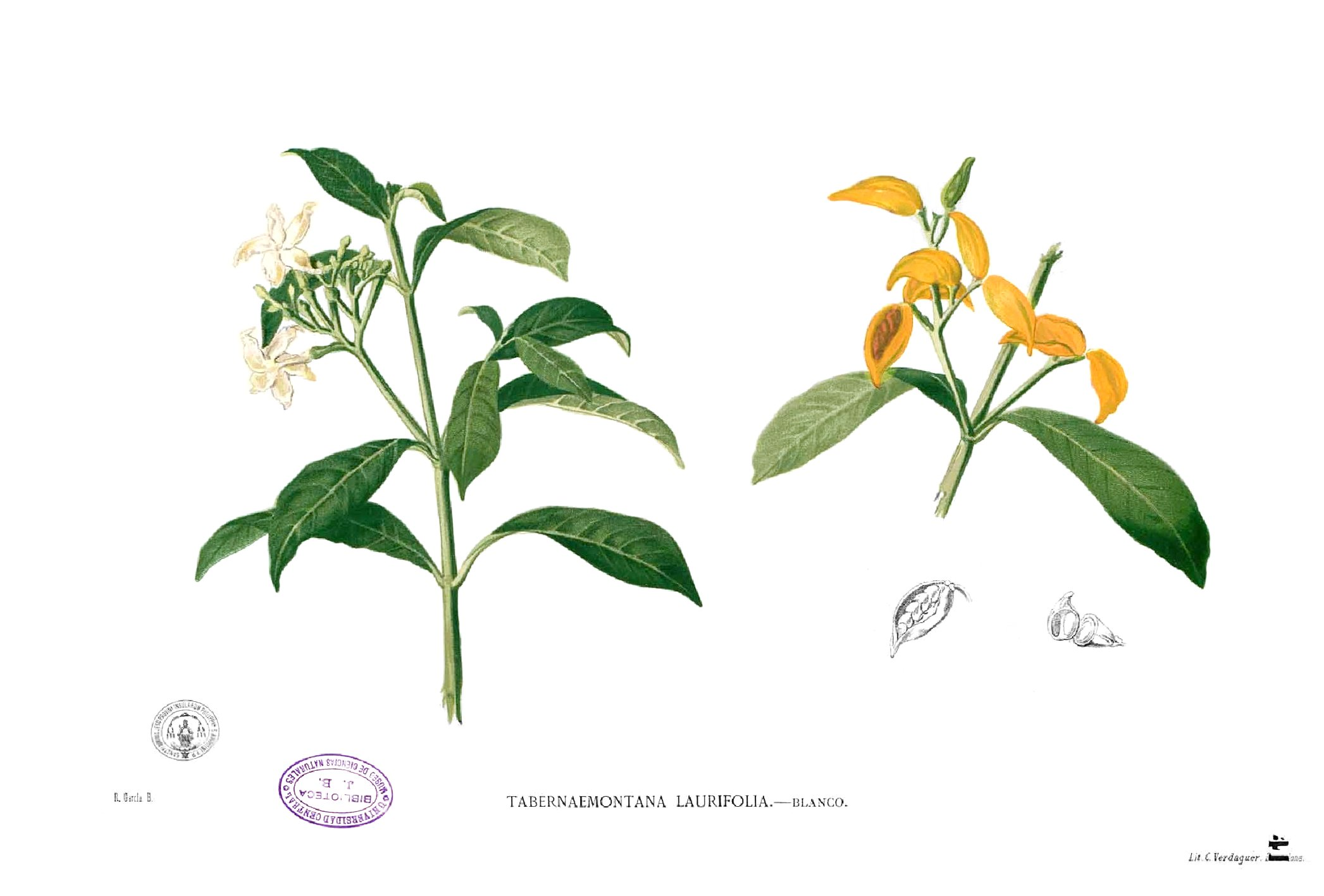
T. pandacaqui (banana bush)

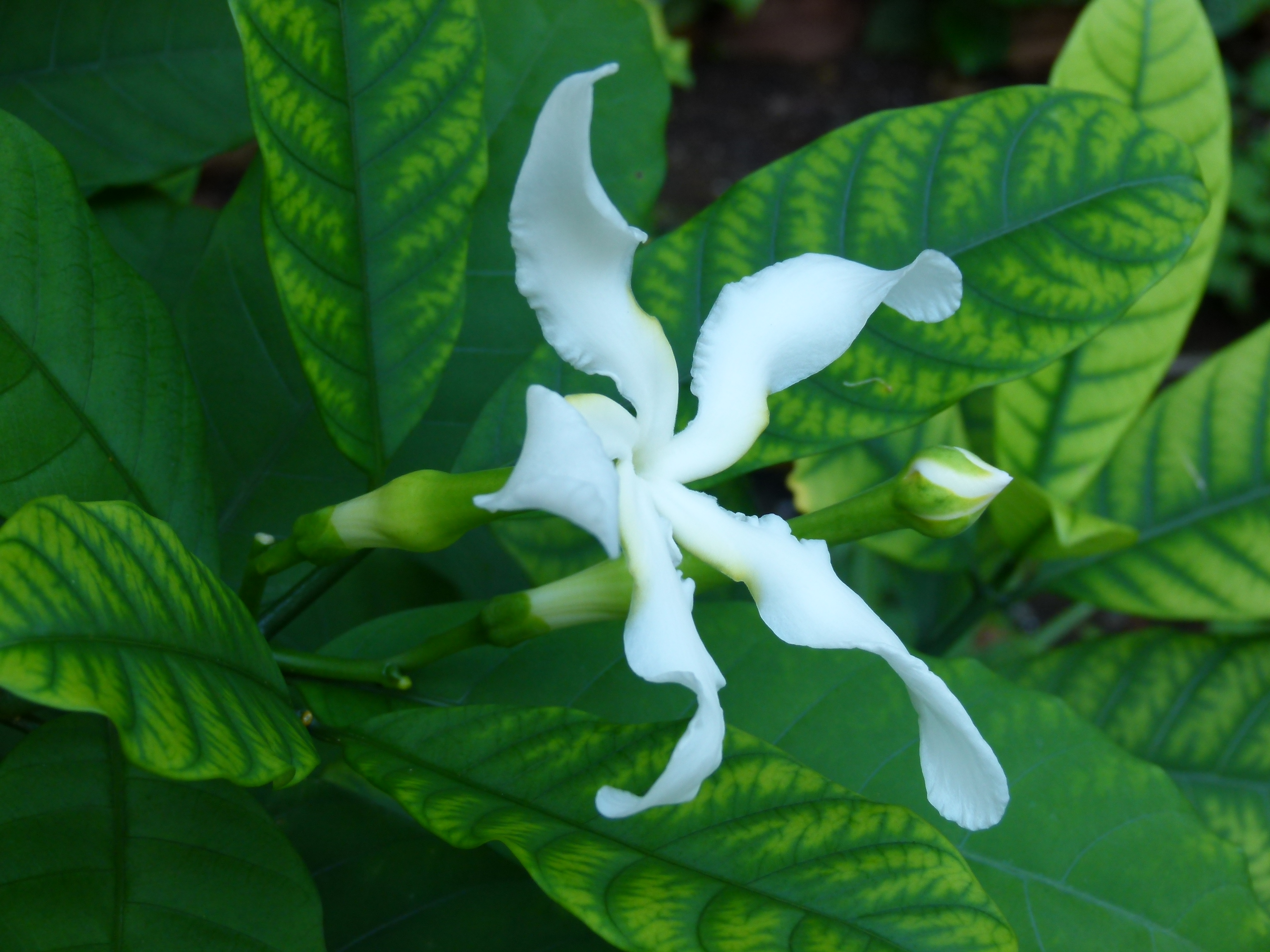
T. pachysiphon

== See also ==
- Psychedelic plants
- Compounds found in Tabernaemontana
  - Affinisine
  - Affinine
