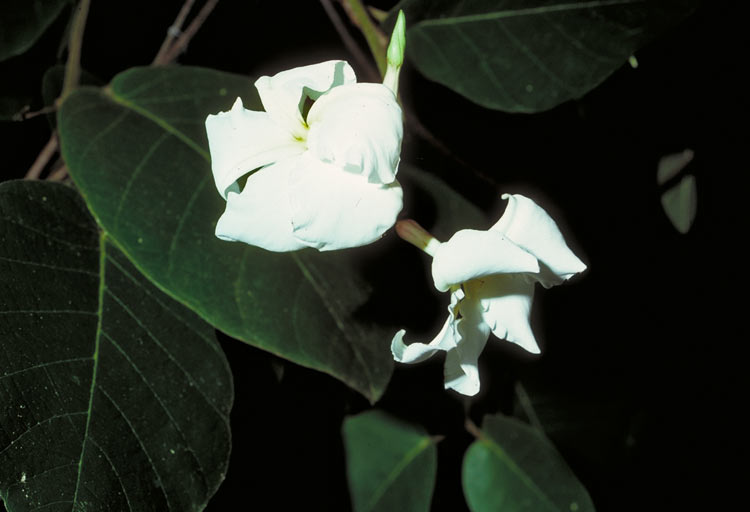

Scientific classification
- Kingdom: Plantae
- Clade: Embryophytes
- Clade: Tracheophytes
- Clade: Spermatophytes
- Clade: Angiosperms
- Clade: Eudicots
- Clade: Asterids
- Order: Gentianales
- Family: Apocynaceae
- Genus: Voacanga
- Species: V. grandifolia

Binomial name
- Voacanga grandifolia (Miq.) Rolfe

Synonyms
- Orchipeda grandifolia (Miq.) Miq.; Pootia grandifolia Miq.; Orchipeda papuana F.Muell.; Pootia exauriculata Teijsm. & Binn.; Tabernaemontana celebica Miq.; Voacanga papuana (F.Muell.) K.Schum., H.G.A.Engler & K.A.E.Prantl; Voacanga versteegii Markgr.

= Voacanga grandifolia =

Species of plant

Voacanga grandifolia is a plant native to Malesia and Queensland, Australia. It is an introduced species in India.

== Description ==
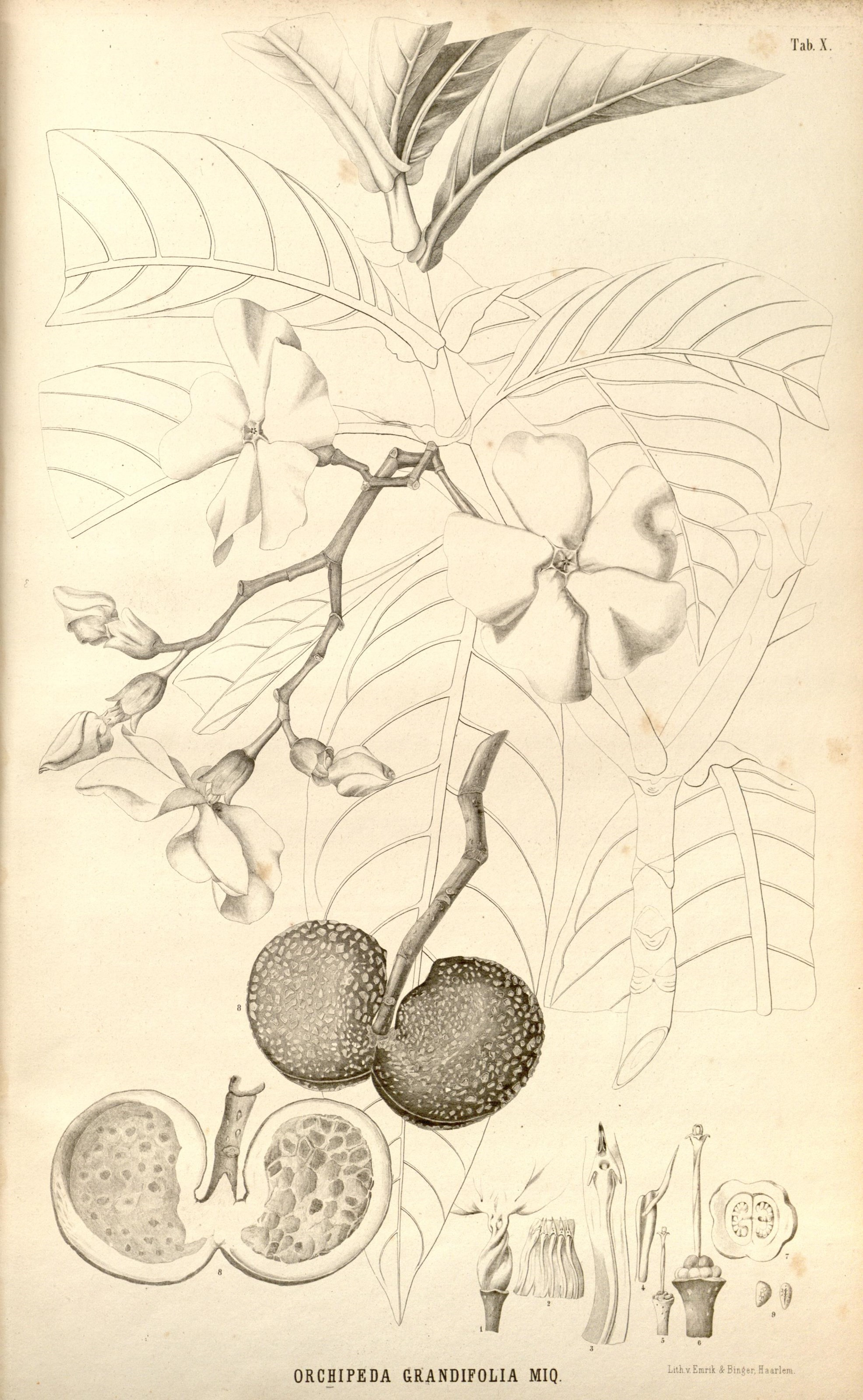
V. grandiflora in Annales Musei Botanici Lugduno-Batavi

Voacanga grandifolia grows as a small tree and produces flowers and fruits. It produces milky exudate when cut or damaged similar to many Apocynaceae plants.

== Chemical composition ==
Voacanga alkaloids are predominant alkaloid in this plant which includes Voacangine, Voacamine, Vobtusine. Voacinol is a new and intriguing stereochemically symmetrical bisindole alkaloid present in leaves along with desacetylvindoline.

== See also ==
- Voacanga africana
