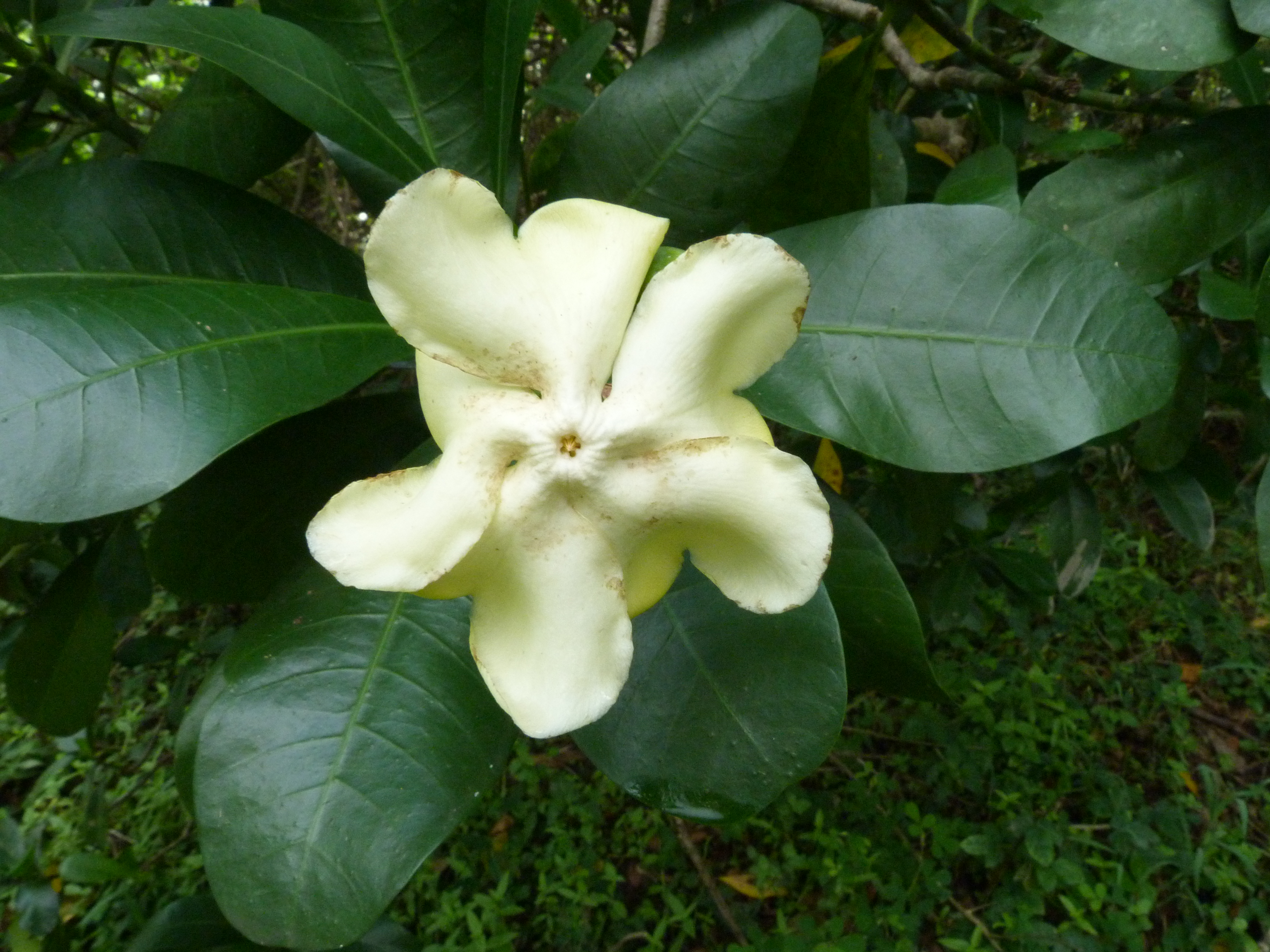

Conservation status
- Least Concern (IUCN 3.1)

Scientific classification
- Kingdom: Plantae
- Clade: Tracheophytes
- Clade: Angiosperms
- Clade: Eudicots
- Clade: Asterids
- Order: Gentianales
- Family: Apocynaceae
- Genus: Voacanga
- Species: V. thouarsii

Binomial name
- Voacanga thouarsii Roem. & Schult.

Synonyms
- Annularia natalensis Hochst.; Cyclostigma natalense (Hochst.) Hochst.; Orchipeda dregei (E.Mey.) DC.; Orchipeda thouarsii (Roem. & Schult.) Baron; Piptolaena dregei (E.Mey.) A.DC.; Voacanga dregei E.Mey.; Voacanga obtusa K.Schum

= Voacanga thouarsii =

Species of plant

Voacanga thouarsii, the wild frangipani, is a species of small tree in the family Apocynaceae.

== Description ==
Voacanga thouarsii grows as a small tree up to 20 m (70 ft) high, with a trunk diameter of up to 80 cm (30 in). Its fragrant flowers feature a pale green, creamy or white corolla. The fruit is dark green, spotted with paired follicles, each up to 10 cm (4 in) long.

== Distribution and habitat ==
Voacanga thouarsii grows natively in tropical and southern Africa and in Madagascar. Its habitat is forest and savanna from sea level to 600 m (2,000 ft) altitude.

== Conservation ==
Voacanga thouarsii has been assessed as least concern on the IUCN Red List. Its habitat is threatened by activities including logging, mining and conversion of land for livestock and crops. However, the species is present in protected areas including numerous national parks in Madagascar; Garamba National Park in the Democratic Republic of the Congo; and iSimangaliso Wetland Park in South Africa.

== Uses ==
Local medicinal uses of Voacanga thouarsii include as a treatment for wounds, sores, gonorrhoea, eczema, heart problems, hypertension, rheumatism, stomach-ache and snakebite.

== Alkaloids ==
Voaluteine (Rupicoline)

Voacangine, ibogaine, voacamine, vobtusine, voacristine, iboluteine, vobasine, 18′-decarbomethoxyvoacamine and voaluteine are shown to be present in the crude extract from the bark of Voacanga thouarsii var. obtusa.
