= Voacanga havilandii =

Scientific classification
- Kingdom: Plantae
- Clade: Tracheophytes
- Clade: Angiosperms
- Clade: Eudicots
- Clade: Asterids
- Order: Gentianales
- Family: Apocynaceae
- Genus: Voacanga
- Species: V. havilandii

Binomial name
- Voacanga havilandii Ridl.

Synonyms
- Voacanga borneensis Markgr.

Species of plant

Voacanga havilandii grows as a small tree up to 15 metres (50 ft) high, with a trunk diameter of up to 15 centimetres (6 in). The bark is pale green to whitish. Its flowers feature a white or cream corolla. The fruit is up to 5 cm (2 in) in diameter. Its habitat is lowland forest from sea level to 200 metres (700 ft) altitude. V. havilandii is endemic to Borneo.
