= Voacanga foetida =

Scientific classification
- Kingdom: Plantae
- Clade: Tracheophytes
- Clade: Angiosperms
- Clade: Eudicots
- Clade: Asterids
- Order: Gentianales
- Family: Apocynaceae
- Genus: Voacanga
- Species: V. foetida

Binomial name
- Voacanga foetida (Blume) Rolfe

Synonyms
- Dicrus foetidus Reinw. ex Blume; Orchipeda foetida Blume; Vinca foetida Noronha

Species of plant

Voacanga foetida grows as a tree up to 20 metres (70 ft) high, with a trunk diameter of up to 40 centimetres (16 in). The bark is grey, whitish brown or grey-brown. Its unpleasant-smelling flowers feature a white corolla. Fruit is up to 11 cm (4 in) in diameter. The specific epithet foetida is from the Latin meaning 'evil-smelling'. Habitat is forest from sea-level to 600 metres (2,000 ft) altitude. V. foetida is found in Indonesia, Malaysia and the Philippines.
