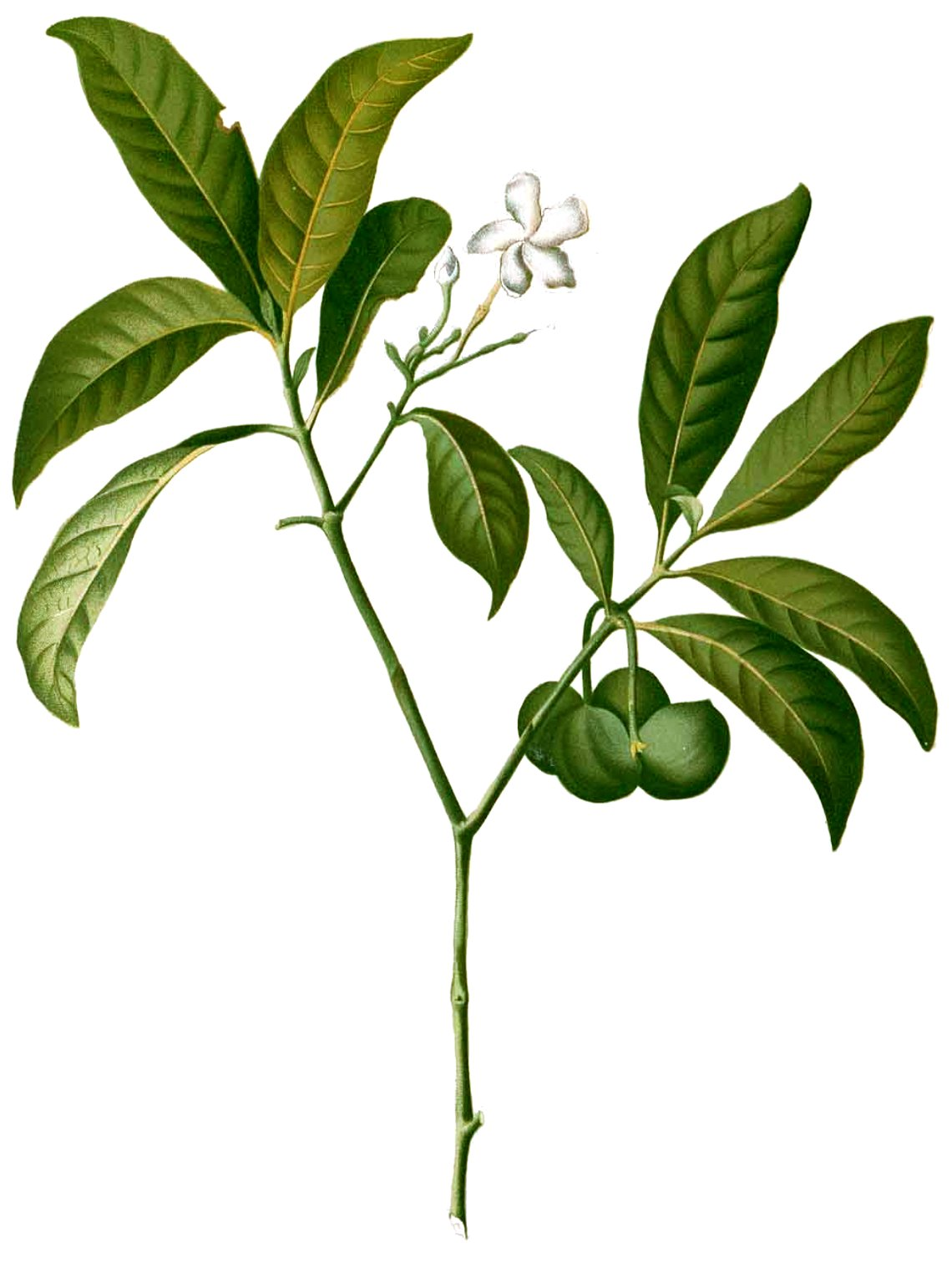
- Voacanga globosa

Scientific classification
- Kingdom: Plantae
- Clade: Tracheophytes
- Clade: Angiosperms
- Clade: Eudicots
- Clade: Asterids
- Order: Gentianales
- Family: Apocynaceae
- Subfamily: Rauvolfioideae
- Tribe: Tabernaemontaneae
- Subtribe: Tabernaemontaninae
- Genus: Voacanga; Thouars

Synonyms
- Dicrus Reinw. ex Blume; Orchipeda Blume; Annularia Hochst.; Cyclostigma Hochst. ex Endl. 1842 not Klotzsch 1843 nor Phil. 1870; Piptolaena Harv.; Pootia Miq.

= Voacanga =

Genus of plants

Voacanga is a genus of plants in the family Apocynaceae found in Africa, Southeast Asia, New Guinea, and Australia. As of August 2013 the World Checklist of Selected Plant Families recognises 13 species:

Species

1. Voacanga africana Stapf ex Scott-Elliot - tropical W + C + E + S Africa
2. Voacanga bracteata Stapf - tropical W + C Africa
3. Voacanga caudiflora Stapf - tropical W Africa
4. Voacanga chalotiana Pierre ex Stapf - tropical C Africa
5. Voacanga foetida (Blume) Rolfe -Java, Borneo, Sumatra, Philippines
6. Voacanga globosa (Blanco) Merr. - Philippines
7. Voacanga gracilipes (Miq.) Markgr. - Maluku
8. Voacanga grandifolia (Miq.) Rolfe - Indonesia, Philippines, New Guinea, Queensland
9. Voacanga havilandii Ridl. - Sarawak
10. Voacanga megacarpa Merr. - Philippines
11. Voacanga pachyceras Leeuwenb. - Zaïre
12. Voacanga psilocalyx Pierre ex Stapf - Nigeria, Cameroon, Gabon, Republic of Congo
13. Voacanga thouarsii Roem. & Schult. Madagascar; widespread from Cape Province to Sudan + Senegal

formerly included

1. Voacanga dichotoma = Tabernaemontana pachysiphon
2. Voacanga plumeriifolia = Tabernaemontana macrocarpa

== Gallery ==
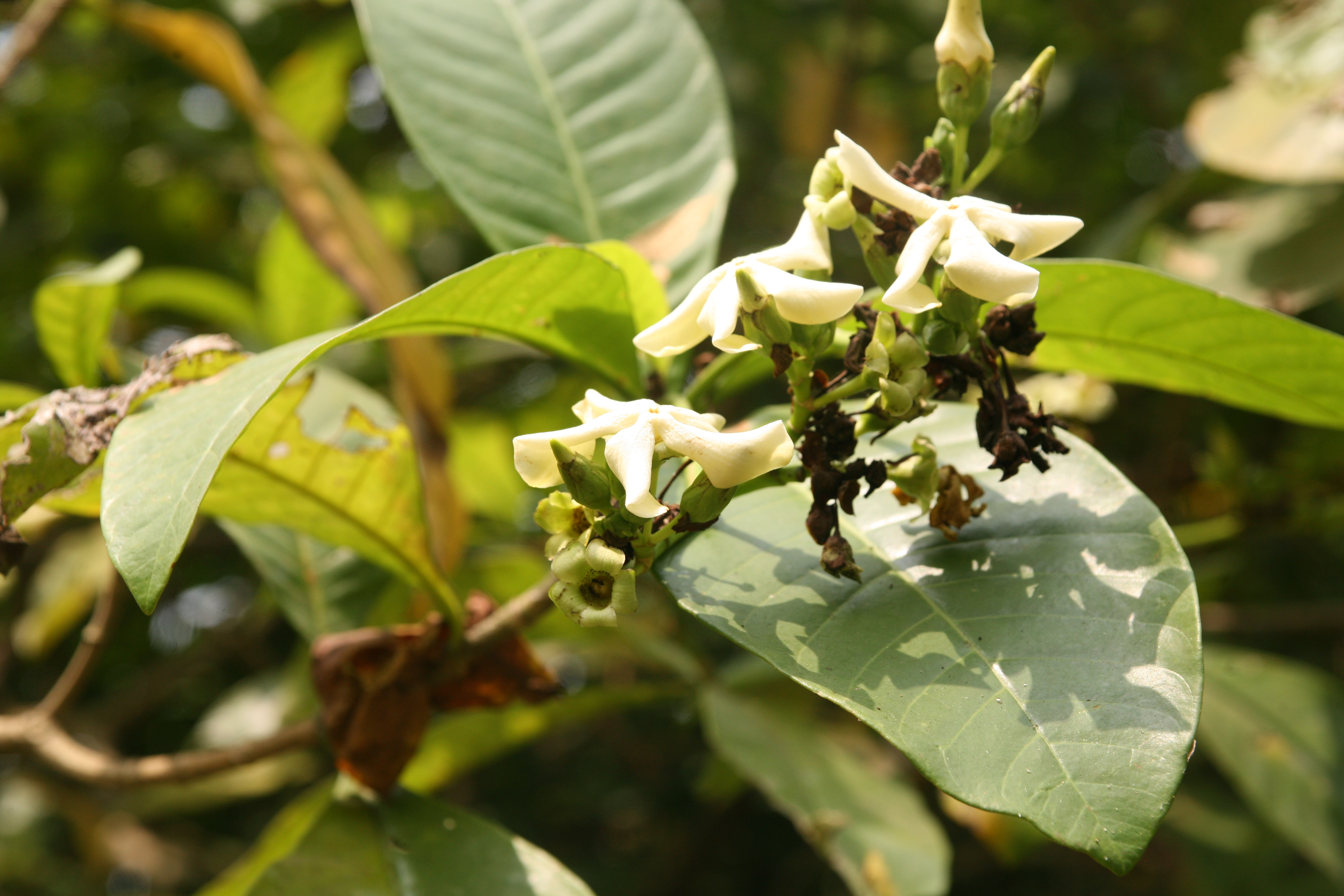
Inflorescence of V. africana.

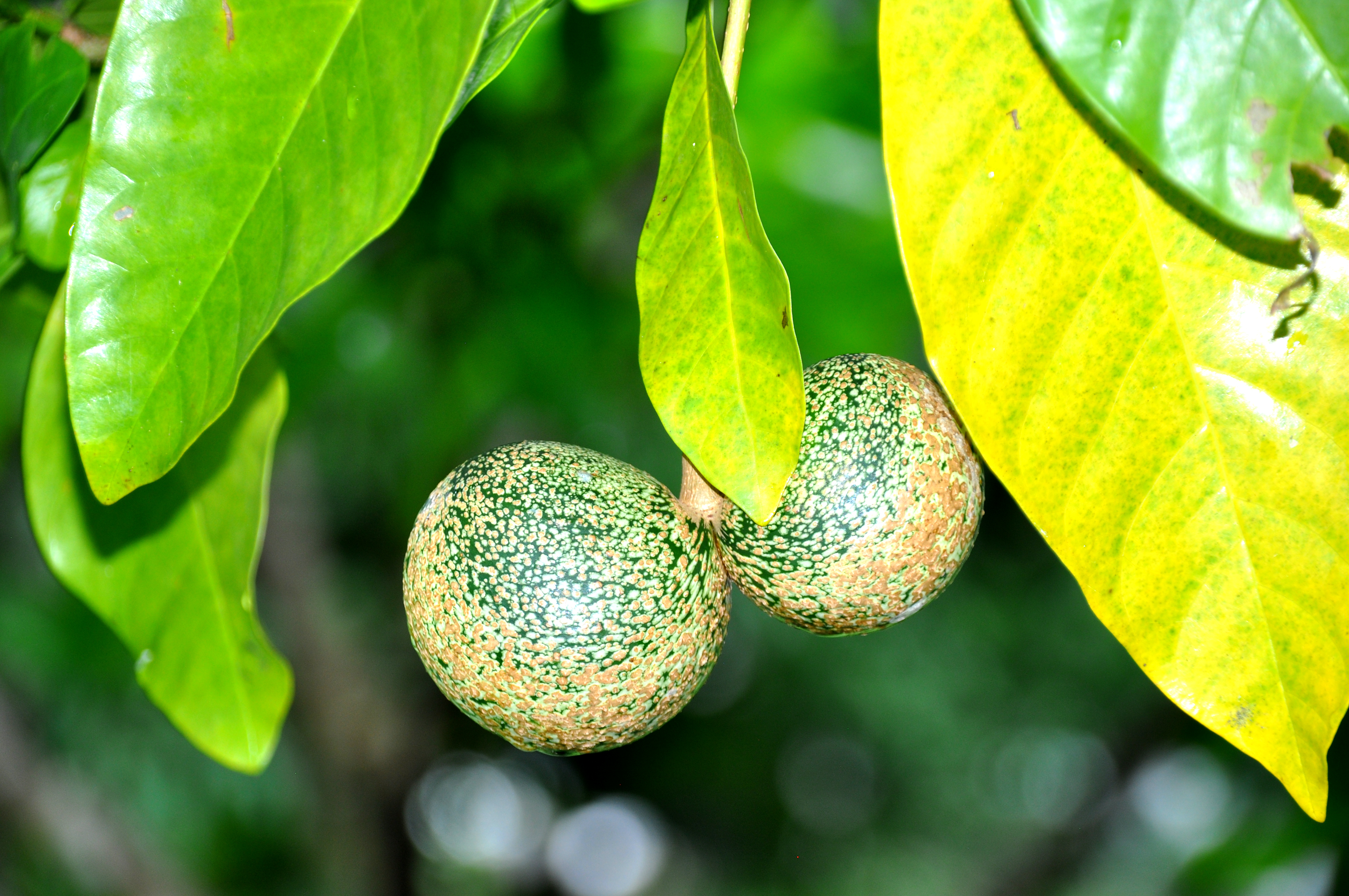
Paired, follicular fruits of V. africana.

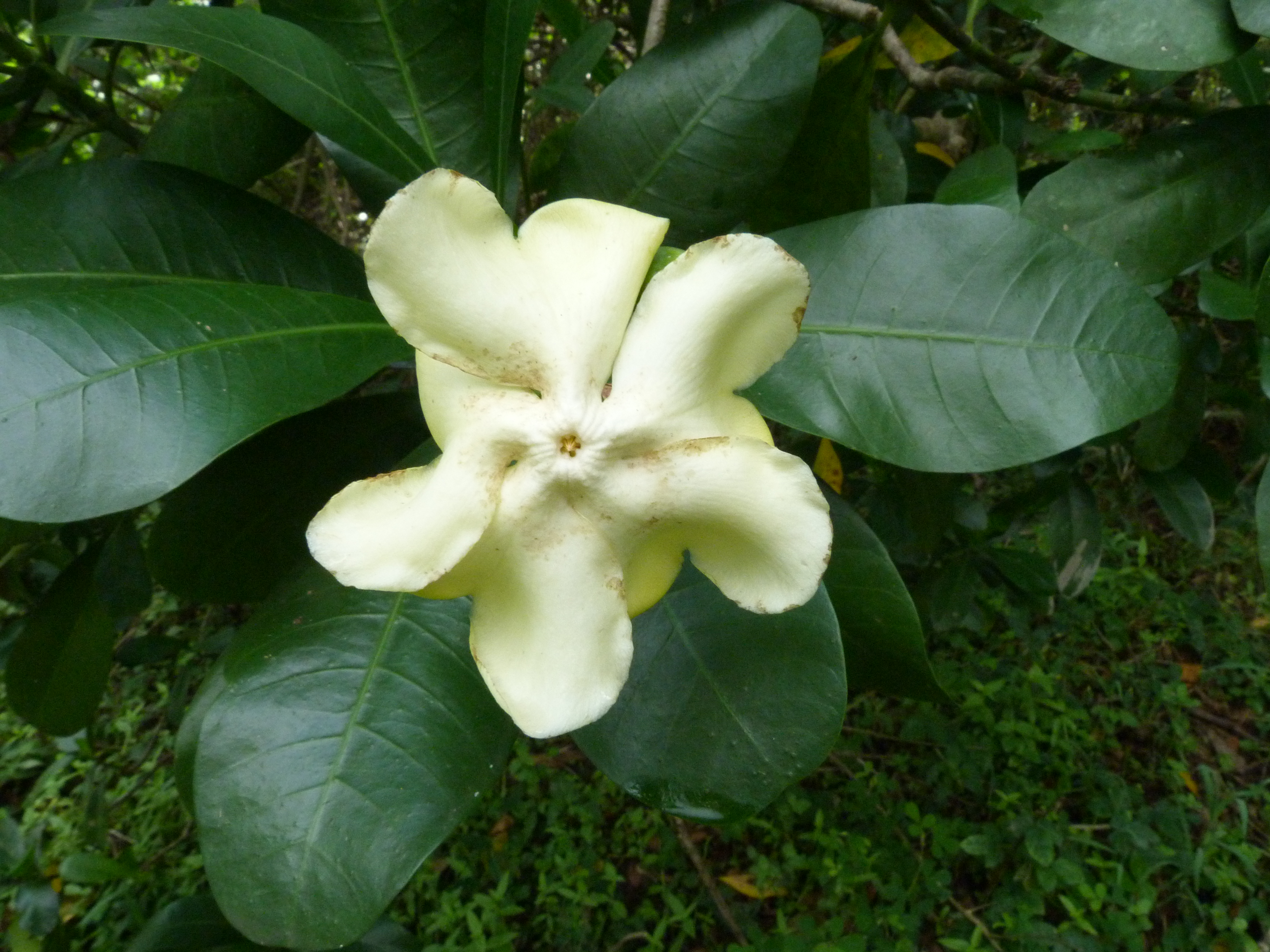
Single flower of V. thouarsii viewed from above to show corolla limb.

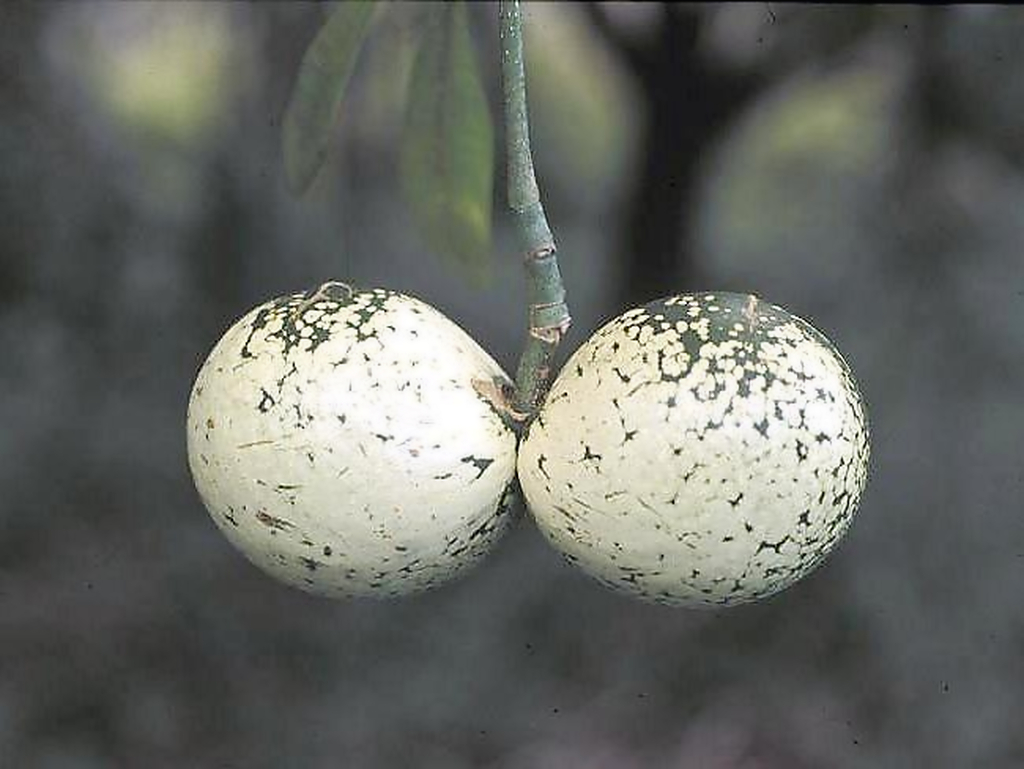
Paired, follicular fruits of V. thouarsii.
