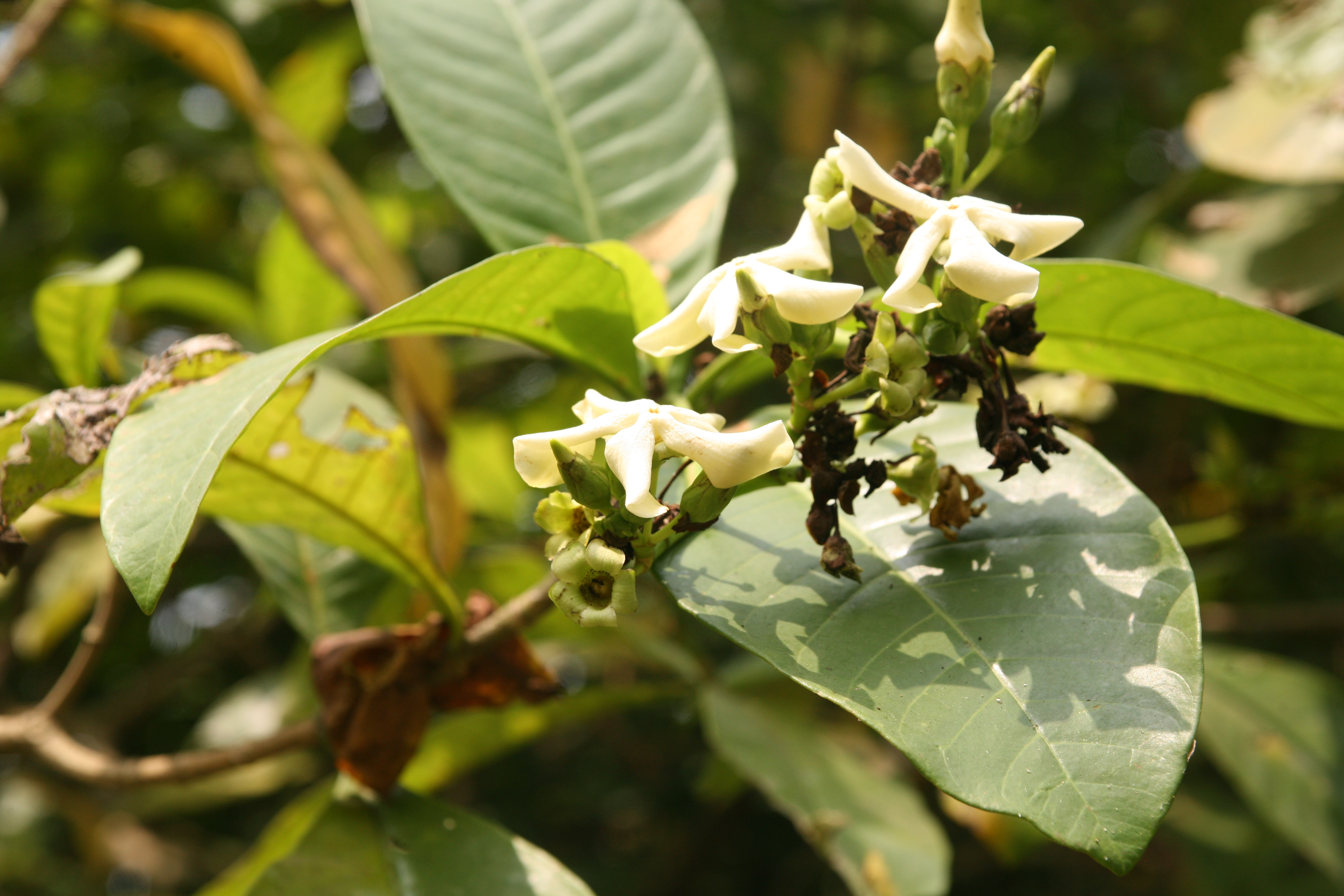

Scientific classification
- Kingdom: Plantae
- Clade: Tracheophytes
- Clade: Angiosperms
- Clade: Eudicots
- Clade: Asterids
- Order: Gentianales
- Family: Apocynaceae
- Genus: Voacanga
- Species: V. africana

Binomial name
- Voacanga africana Stapf

= Voacanga africana =

Species of tree

Voacanga africana is a small tree native to tropical Africa belonging to the family Apocynaceae that grows to 6 m (20 ft) in height and bears leaves that are up to 30 cm (12 in) in length. The yellow or white flowers are succeeded by paired, follicular, dehiscent fruit with a mottled green exocarp and a pulpy, yellow mesocarp surrounding the seeds. The plant contains alkaloids acting as CNS depressants and hypotensives.

== Description ==
Voacanga africana is a small tree up to 6 m (20 ft) tall with a spreading crown. The leaves are in opposite pairs, dark glossy green above and paler green below. The white or yellow flowers are in small bunches borne either in leaf axils or at the end of shoots. The spherical, dark green fruits, dappled with paler green, grow usually in pairs and contain seeds embedded in a yellow pulp.

== History ==
Voacanga africana was named by botanist Otto Stapf in 1894 after he received a type specimen from George Scott-Elliot, who had been participating in the Sierra Leone Boundary Commission. From its discovery in 1894 onward, botanists considered the plant to have little economic usefulness apart from as a rubber adulterant. This changed when, in 1955, French chemists Maurice Marie-Janot and Robert Goutarel extracted three alkaloids from the Voacanga africana which they believed could be used in the treatment of heart conditions. Global interest in the plant as a source of useful chemicals followed, and today the plant is a major non-timber forest product exported from Ghana, Cameroon, and Nigeria, and Côte d'Ivoire.

== Uses ==
Chemical structure of voacangine

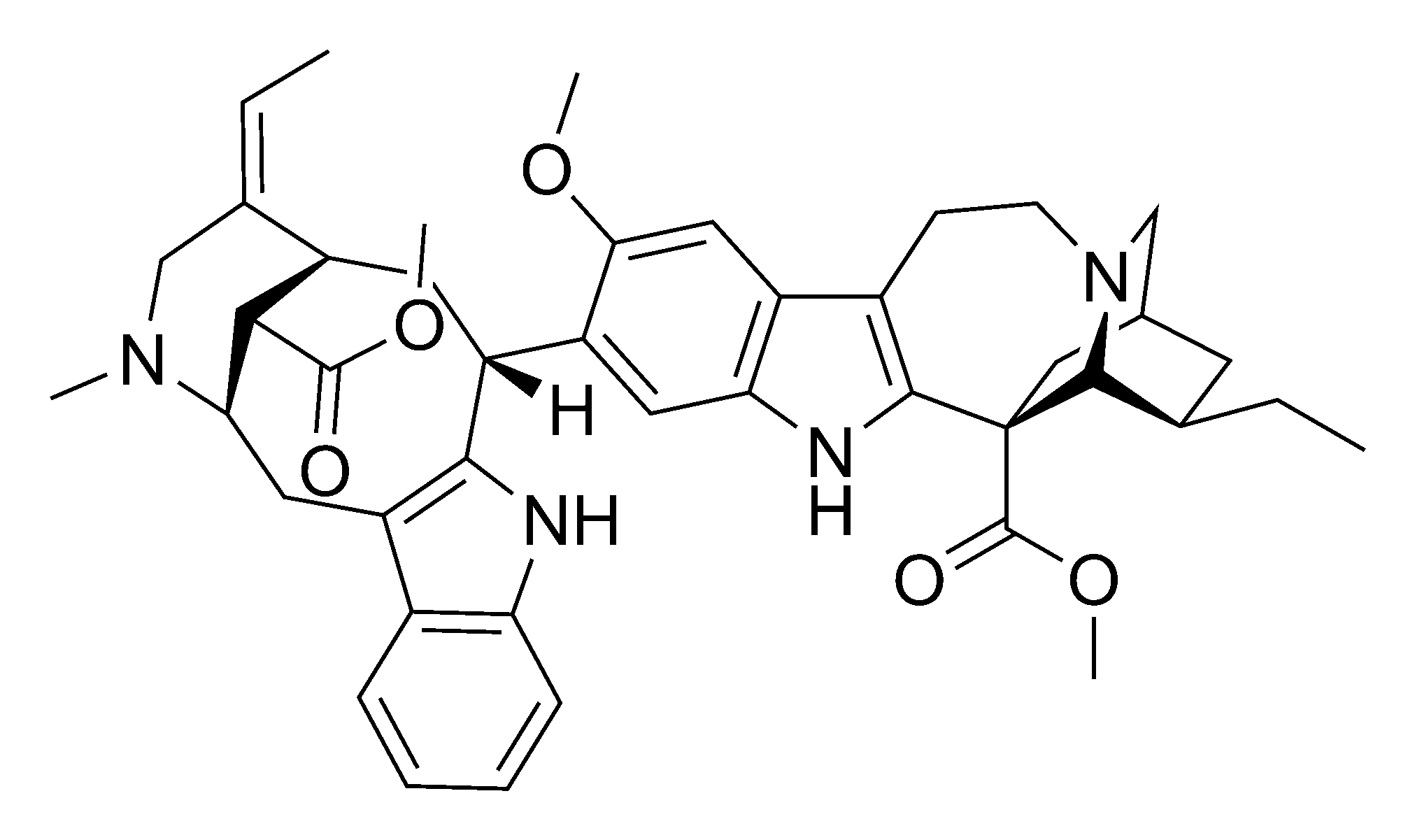
Chemical structure of voacamine

The plant contains a large number of alkaloids related to the anti-addiction medication ibogaine, including some of the only known naturally occurring CB1 receptor antagonists. One of the plant's alkaloids, voacangine, has been used as a precursor in the semi-synthesis of ibogaine. Voacamidine and voacamine cleavage can be used to increase voacangine yield. While small amounts of ibogaine are found in Voacanga africana root bark, they do not occur in sufficient quantity to have medicinal or psychoactive effects. Extracts from the plant are also used in the production of vinpocetine, a medication used to treat Alzheimer's disease, and vinblastine, used to treat leukemia.

In The Encyclopedia of Psychoactive Plants by Christian Rätsch included an entry on the Voacanga genus, which claimed that various members of the genus are used in West Africa for their psychoactive effects. Since 2007, more specific, unsubstantiated rumors have circulated that the bark and seeds of the tree are used in Ghana as a poison, stimulant, and ceremonial psychedelic due to an edit made to a Wikipedia article about the plant by a Ghanaian businessman who linked to a website advertising the seeds. A 2009 study by the National Institute of Health Sciences in Tokyo, Japan found that the seed and bark products sold online as Voacanga africana could be characterized as two distinct "chemical types": a "tabersonine" type and an "ibogaine" type. This finding was later used by historian Timmy Vilgiate to support the theory that the Voacanga africana plants sold in the online ethnobotanical market might consist of multiple distinct species.

== Gallery ==
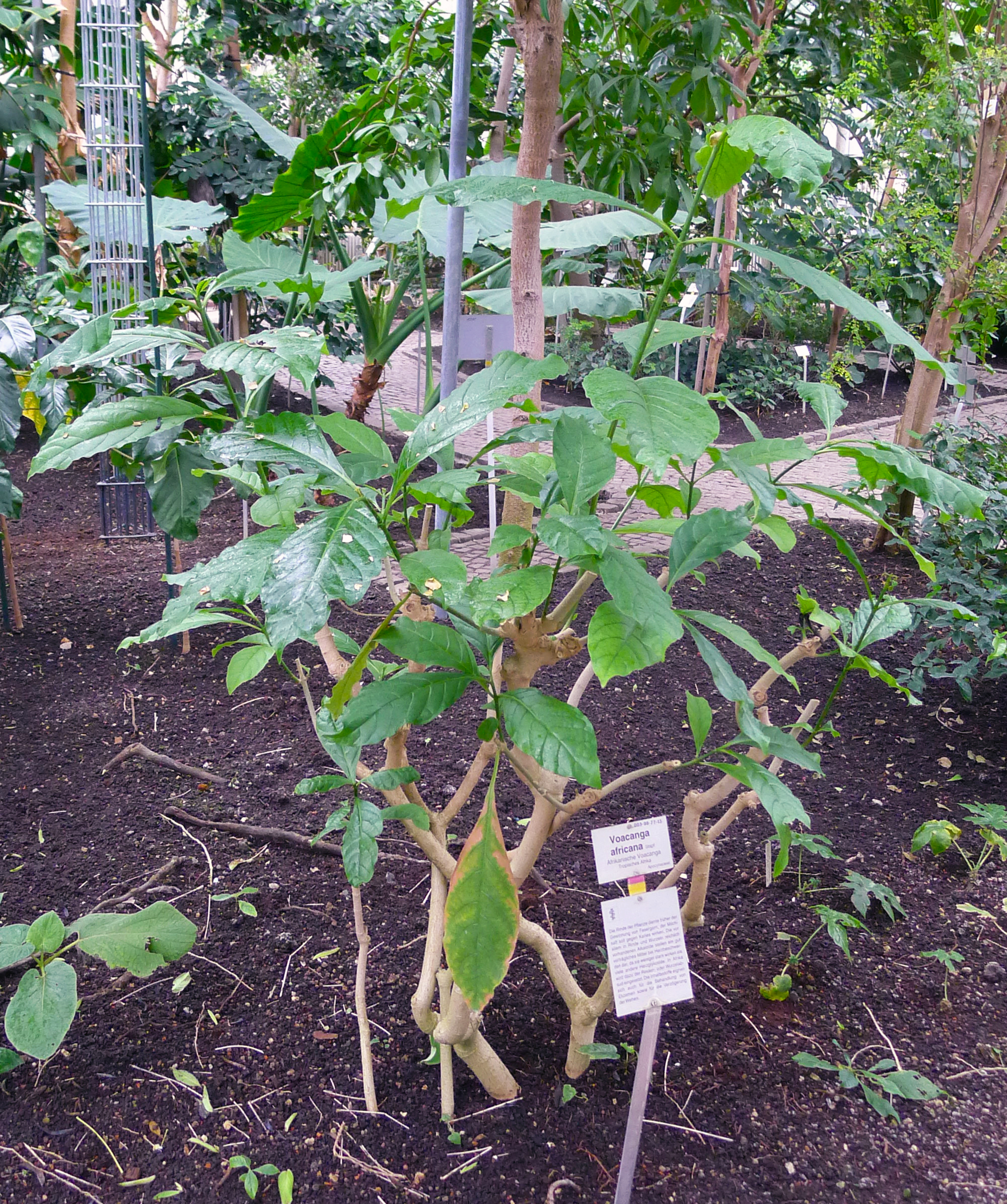
Saplings growing in glasshouse border, Berlin Botanic Garden.

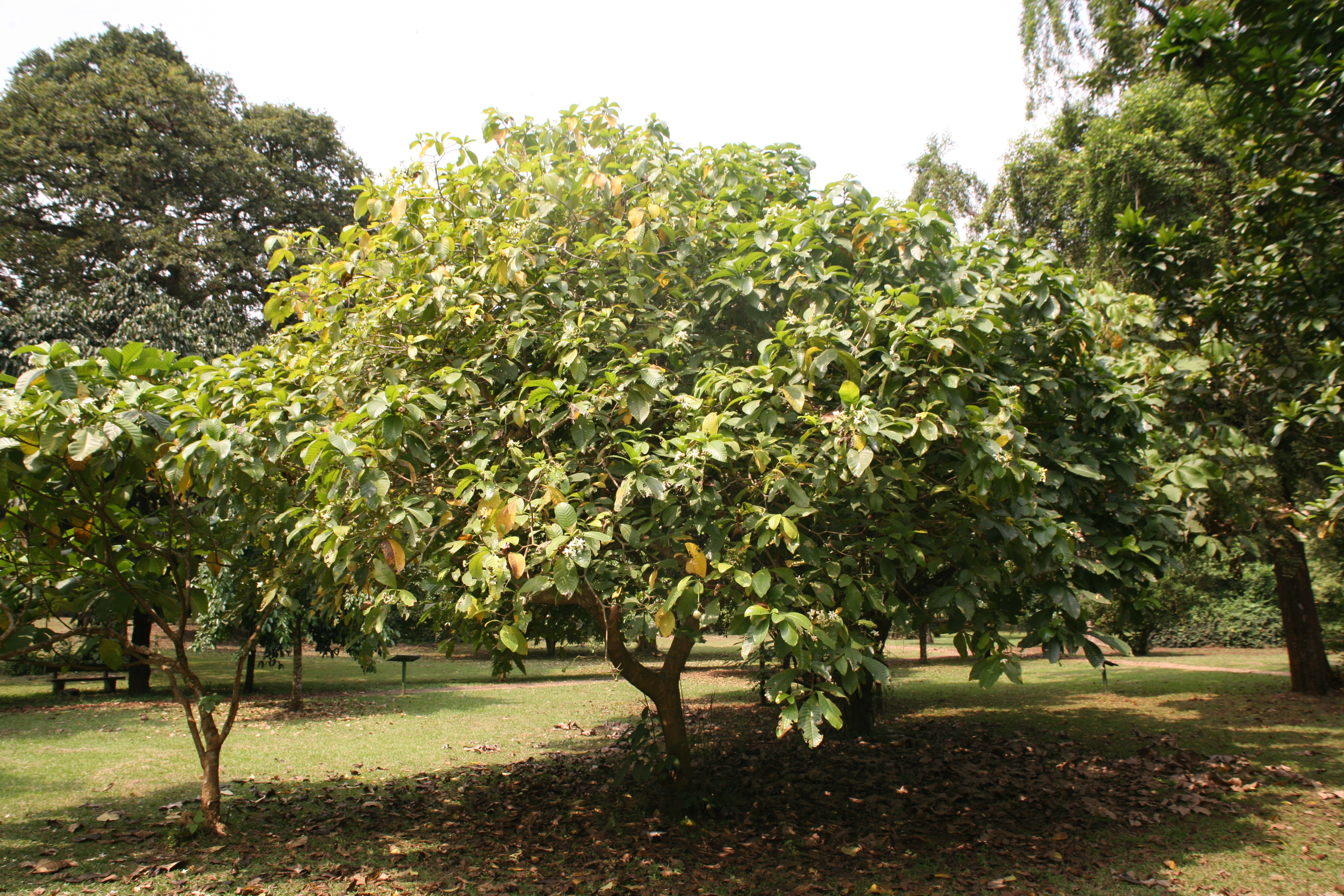
Mature specimen, showing low, domed canopy. Jardin botanique de Limbé, Cameroun.

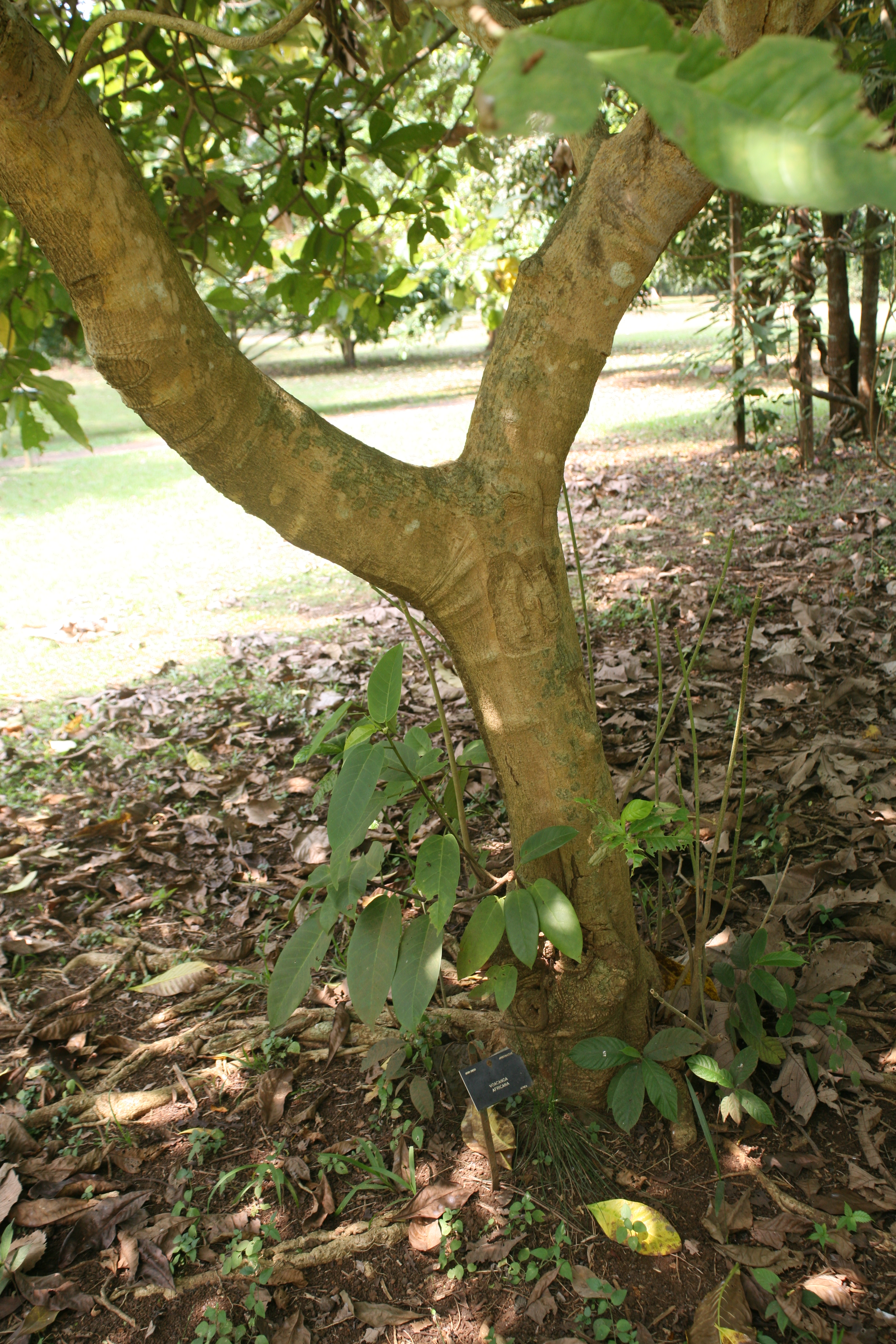
Short trunk of mature specimen, showing low bifurcation. Jardin botanique de Limbé, Cameroun.

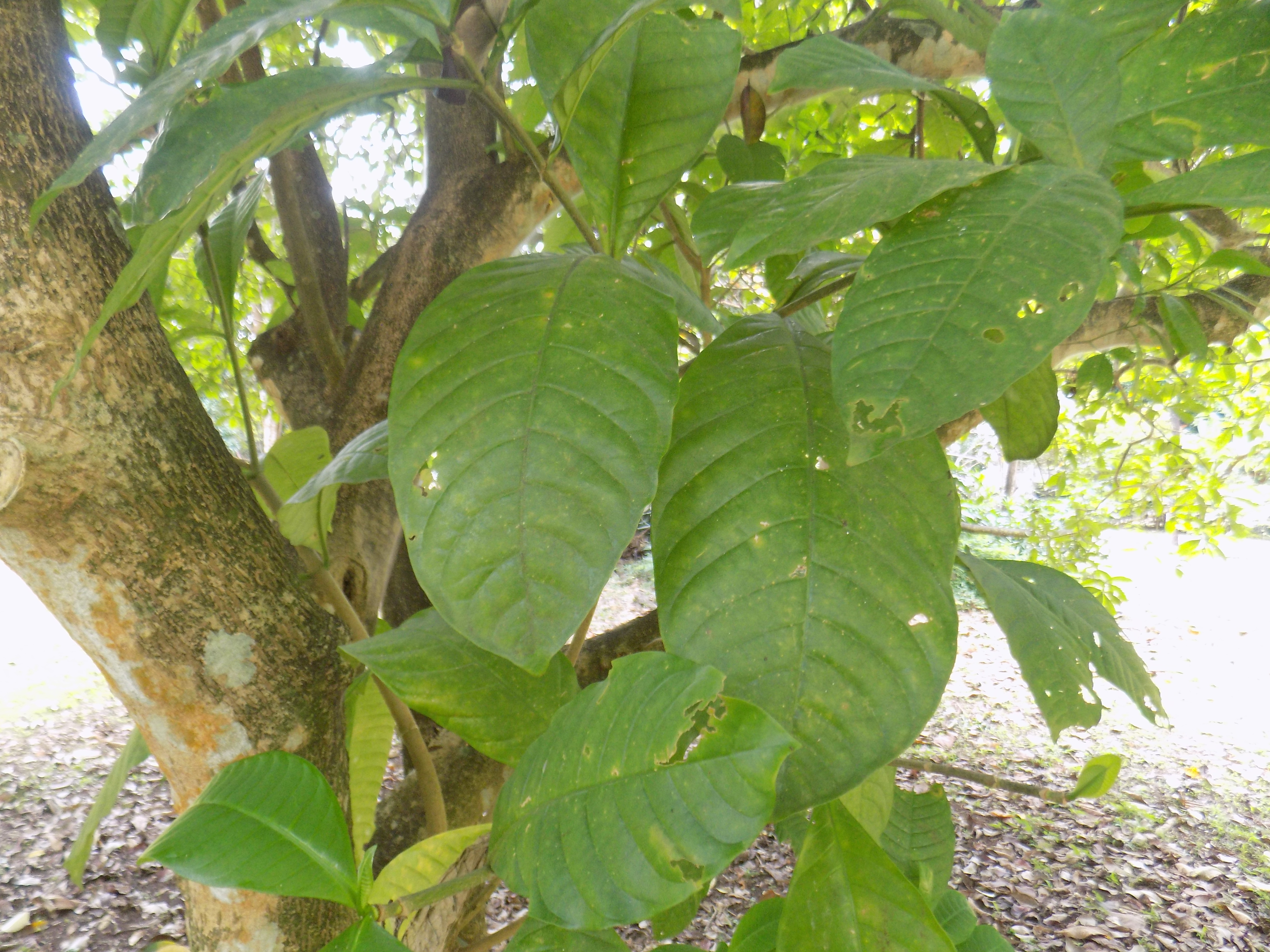
Base of mature tree, showing reticulated bark and large leathery leaves borne by suckers. Jardin botanique de Limbé, Cameroun.

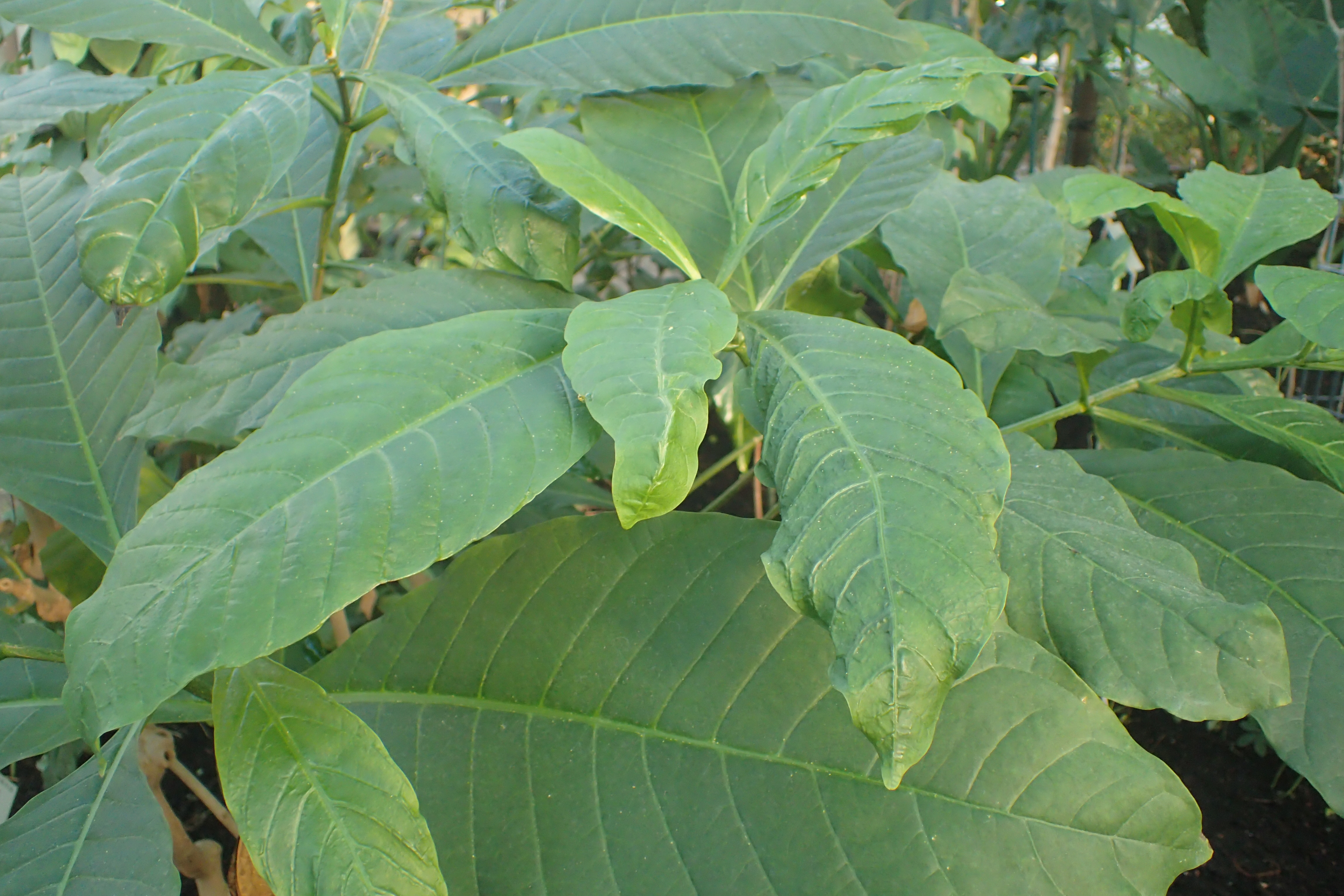
Close-up of leaves, showing depressed venation. Berlin Botanic Garden.

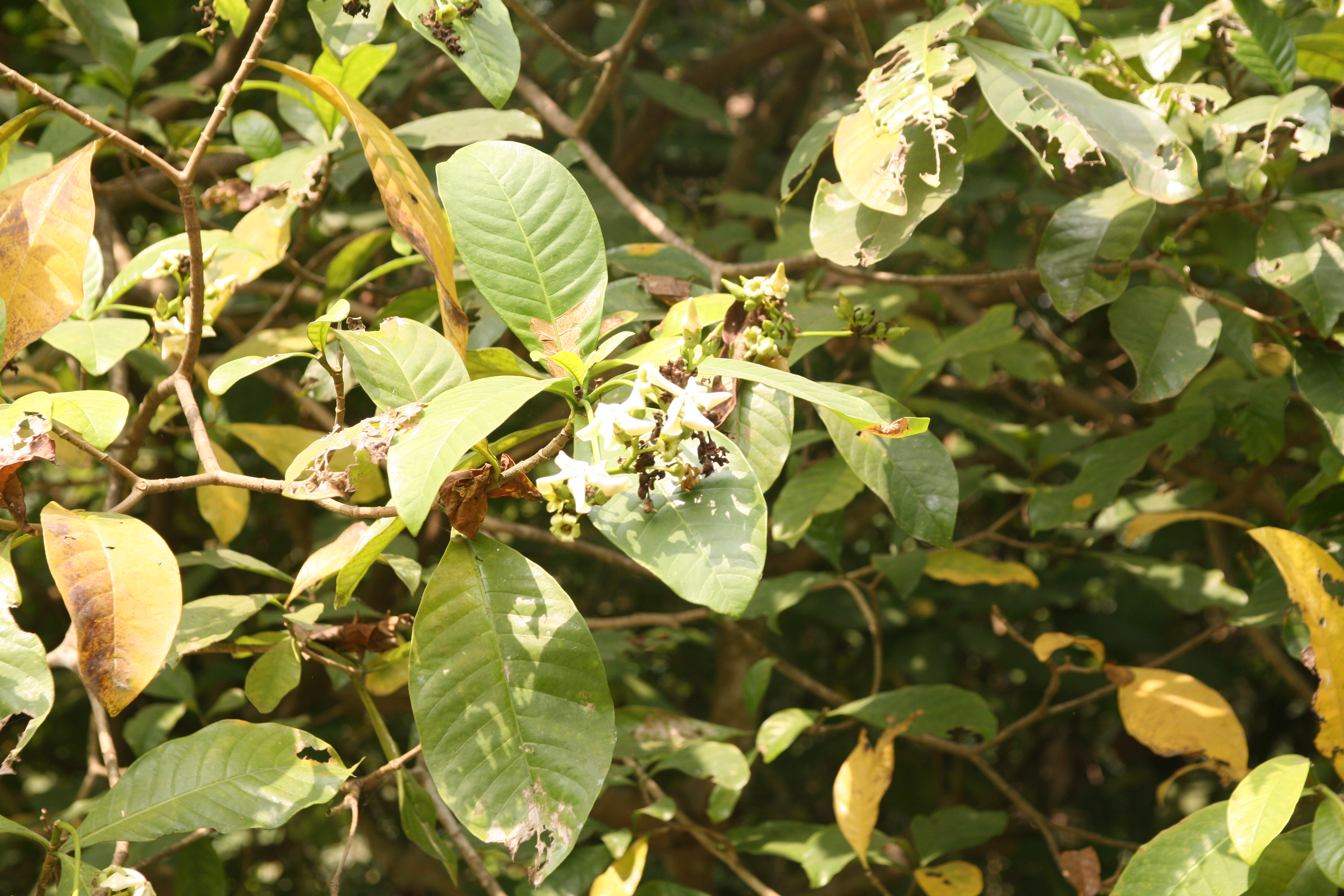
Flowering upper branches showing extensive beetle and/or caterpillar damage to leaves.

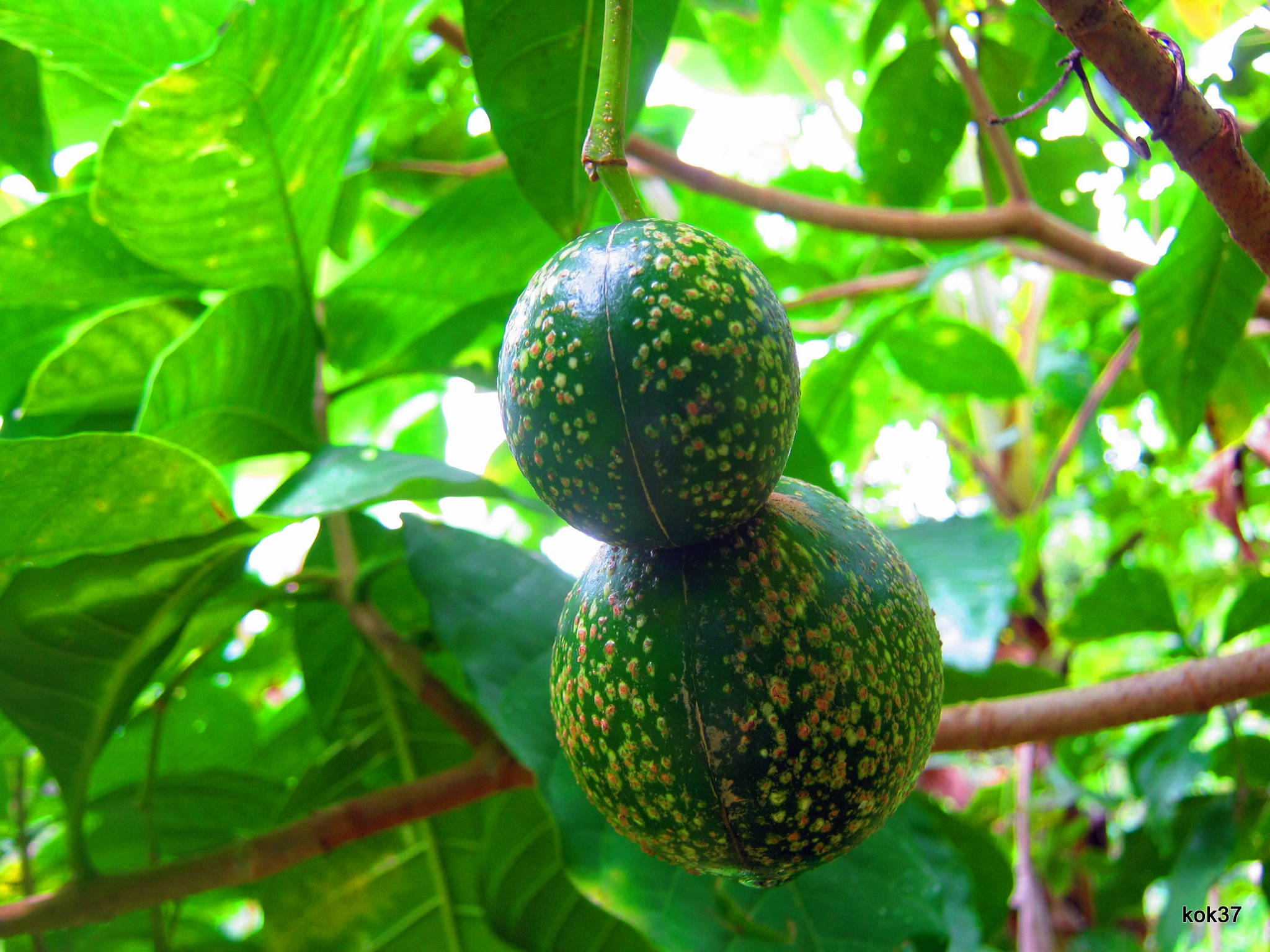
Paired, follicular, globose, mottled fruits, hanging in canopy.

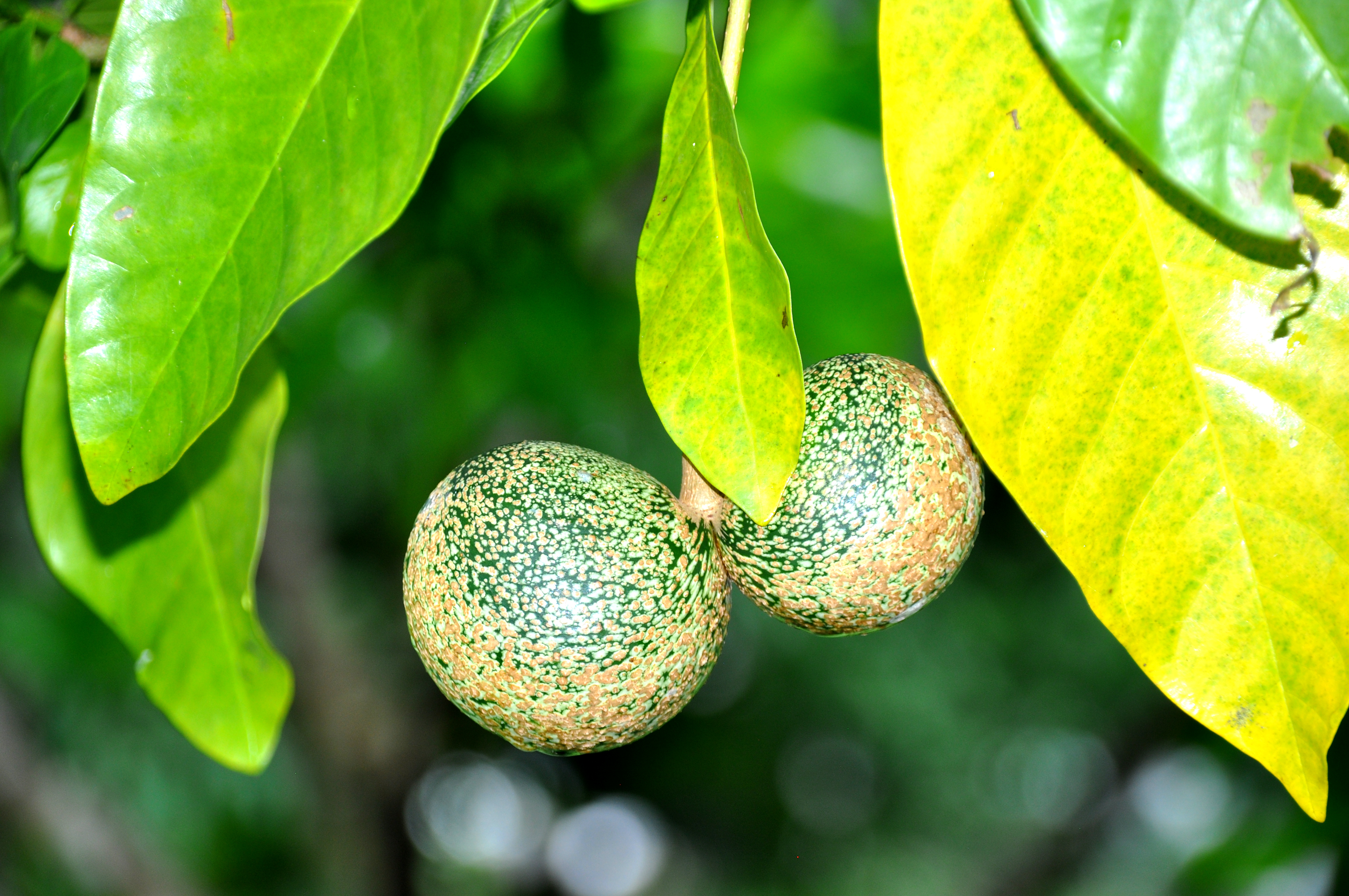
Side view of paired follicles (fruits) borne at stem tip. Jardin botanique de Limbé, Cameroun.

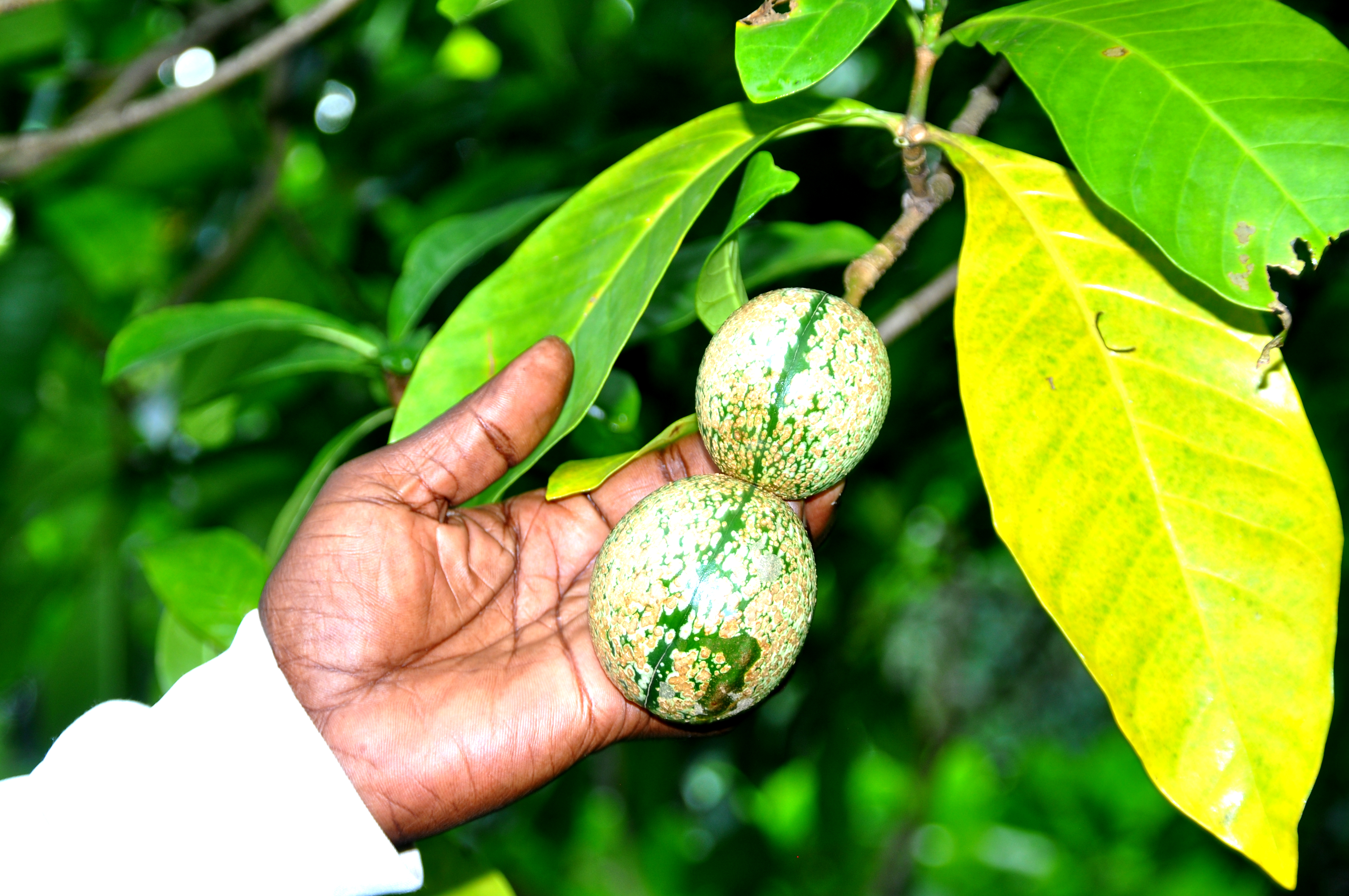
Underside of paired follicles with human hand showing scale.
