= Vobtusine =

Identifiers
CAS Number	19772-79-3
3D model (JSmol)	Interactive image
ChEBI	CHEBI:10016
ChemSpider	66217
ECHA InfoCard	100.039.338
PubChem CID	73534
CompTox Dashboard (EPA)	DTXSID60941546
- InChI: InChI=1S/C43H50N4O6/c1-50-30-9-5-7-28-32(30)47-24-38(20-25-21-39-13-18-52-31(39)10-15-45-17-12-42(28,36(39)45)43(25,47)49)23-46-16-11-41-27-6-3-4-8-29(27)44-33(41)26(34(48)51-2)22-40(35(41)46)14-19-53-37(38)40/h3-9,25,31,35-37,44,49H,10-24H2,1-2H3/t25-,31+,35+,36+,37+,38+,39-,40+,41+,42-,43-/m1/s1 Key: IIMPGJMHQMBXKL-OPDPKHDKSA-N
- SMILES: COC1=CC=CC2=C1N3C[C@]4(C[C@H]5[C@]3([C@]26CCN7[C@H]6[C@@]8(C5)CCO[C@H]8CC7)O)CN9CC[C@@]12[C@@H]9[C@@]3([C@H]4OCC3)CC(=C1NC1=CC=CC=C21)C(=O)OC

Properties
Chemical formula	C_{43}H_{50}N_{4}O_{6}
Molar mass	718.895 g·mol^{−1}
- Except where otherwise noted, data are given for materials in their standard state (at 25 °C [77 °F], 100 kPa). Infobox references

Vobtusine is an alkaloid found in several different plants in the genus Voacanga.

== See also ==
- Apparicine
- Affinisine
- Voacamine
- Lochnericine
