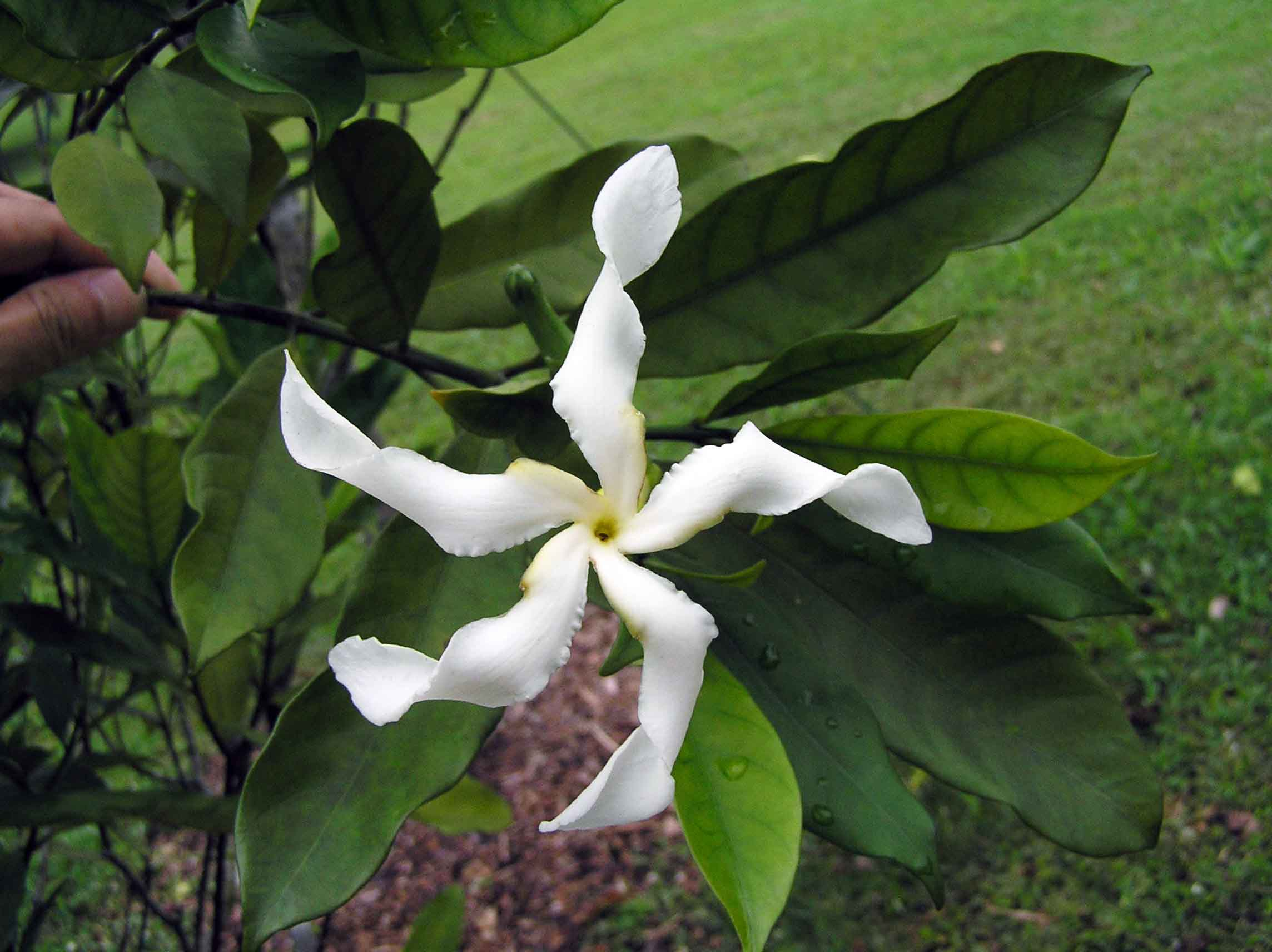
- in Singapore Botanic Gardens

Conservation status
- Least Concern (IUCN 3.1)

Scientific classification
- Kingdom: Plantae
- Clade: Embryophytes
- Clade: Tracheophytes
- Clade: Spermatophytes
- Clade: Angiosperms
- Clade: Eudicots
- Clade: Asterids
- Order: Gentianales
- Family: Apocynaceae
- Genus: Tabernaemontana
- Species: T. macrocarpa

Binomial name
- Tabernaemontana macrocarpa Jack

Synonyms
- List: Ervatamia macrocarpa (Jack) Merr.; Ervatamia plumeriifolia (Elmer) Pichon; Neuburgia sumatrana (Miq.) Boerl.; Orchipeda sumatrana Miq.; Pagiantha macrocarpa (Jack) Markgr.; Pagiantha megacarpa (Merr.) Markgr.; Pagiantha plumeriifolia (Elmer) Markgr.; Tabernaemontana megacarpa (Merr.); Tabernaemontana plumeriifolia (Elmer) Merr.; Voacanga plumeriifolia Elmer

= Tabernaemontana macrocarpa =

Species of plant

Tabernaemontana macrocarpa grows as a shrub or tree up to 30 metres (100 ft) tall, with a trunk diameter of up to 50 centimetres (20 in). The bark is yellowish brown, brown, grey-brown or grey. Its fragrant flowers feature combinations of cream, white and orange corolla lobes. The fruit is orange, with paired follicles, each up to 16 centimetres (6 in) in diameter. The specific epithet macrocarpa is from the Greek meaning 'large fruit'. Its habitat is forests from sea level to 1,500 metres (5,000 ft) altitude. Tabernaemontana macrocarpa has been used as arrow poison. The species is native to Thailand and Malesia.
