= Limbe Botanic Garden =

Botanical garden in Cameroon

- Limbe Botanical Gardens
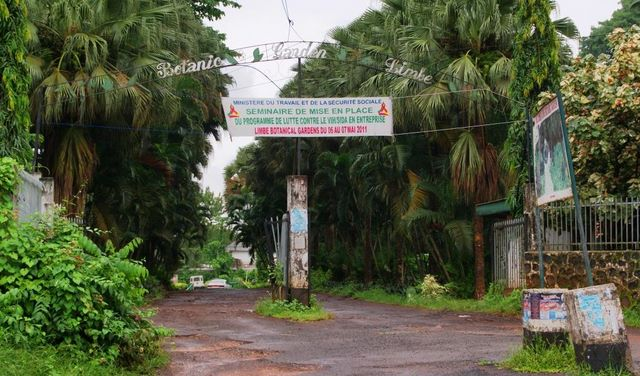
- Entrance to the garden
- Interactive map of Limbe Botanic Garden
- Type: Botanic garden
- Location: Limbe, Cameroon
- Coordinates: 4.0134°N 9.2120°E
- Elevation: 0
- Created: 1892
- Founder: Paul Rudolph Preuss
- Collections: living plants, herbarium

Limbe Botanic Garden or Limbe Botanical Gardens (LBG) is the principal botanic garden of Cameroon. It was created in 1892, during the German colonial era, in Victoria (former name of Limbe), between the ocean and Mount Cameroon. Initially with an agronomic intent, it has become one of the main recreational and tourist attractions of the South-West Region.

== Location ==
Limbe Botanic Garden is situated on the Morton Bay coast in Limbe, at the mouth of the Limbe River which flows through the garden. It lies in the Fako Division of the South West Province of Cameroon.

== History ==
The garden was created in 1892 by a German team led by Paul Rudolph Preuss. Originally, it was a trial garden, a centre for experimentation and acclimatisation of useful tropical species, such as rubber, coffee, cocoa, oil palm, banana, teak, and sugar cane, destined for Kamerun and other German colonies. In its heyday, it was considered one of the most important tropical botanical gardens in the world.

In 1920 the British took over the garden in collaboration with the Royal Botanic Gardens, Kew, which provided advice and training. After their departure in 1932 and until 1958, the garden was administered directly by Cameroonian staff, then, in the wake of independence, in 1961, it was taken over by the Government.

In 1988 a partnership concluded with the United Kingdom allowed its renovation and development. Originally intended for agriculture, the botanical garden is now oriented towards conservation, education, science, tourism and leisure.

Today the garden, which originally covered 250 hectares (620 acres), has no more than 48 hectares (120 acres). Some buildings, the laboratory and library - have for some time been transformed into a hospital. There is now a luxury hotel there.

Stereoscopic views of the garden in 1904

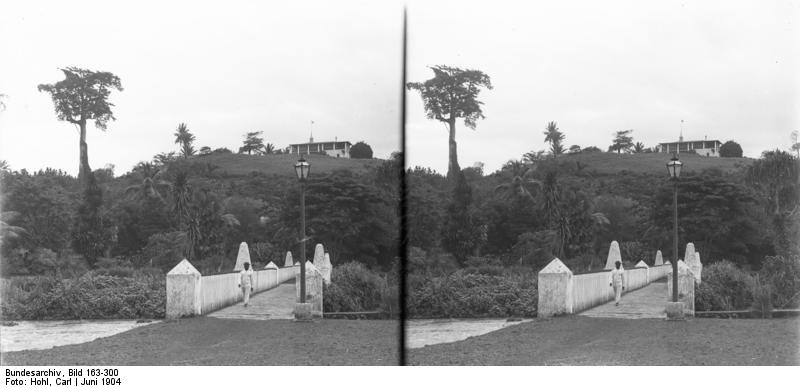

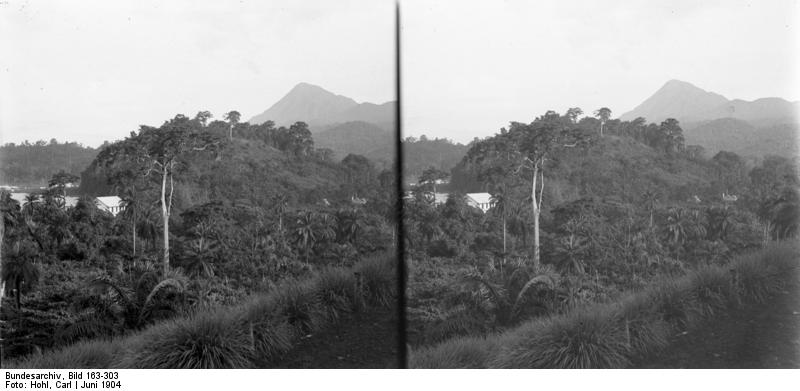

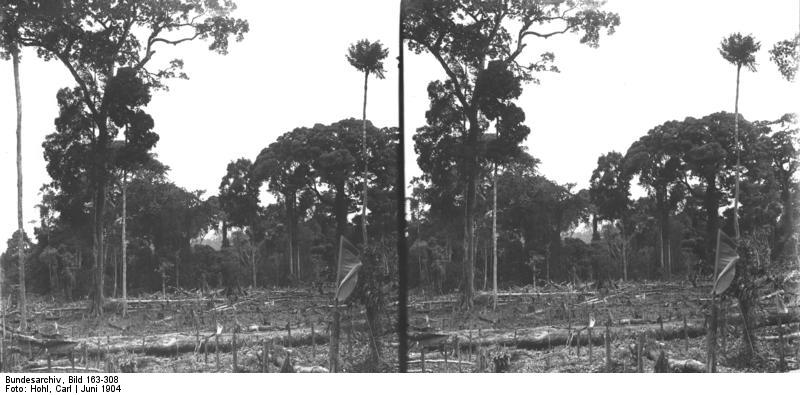

== Associated personalities ==
Past directors of the Limbe Botanic Garden have included:

- from 1892 to 1902: Paul Rudolph Preuss],
- from 1906 to 1907: August Weberbauer,
- from 1927 to 1932: Thomas Douglas Maitland

Hubert Winkler worked there in 1904–1905, and Carl Ludwig Ledermann in 1908.

== Collections ==
The garden has around 1,500 taxa (1,000 herbaceous and 500 woody plants). There are rare or threatened plants: 150 endemic, 100 from the southwest, including Calamus, Prunus africana and Gnetum. Certain plants are the subject of particular attention, in particular the African palm trees, the endemics of Mount Cameroon and the Musa. Others are cultivated for conservation purposes: Irvingia gabonensis, Garcinia kola, Afrostyrax kamerunensis, Cola spp., Prunus africana, Gnetum, Pterocarpus soyauxii, Diospyros, Rauvolfia vomitoria, Nauclea diderrichii, Terminalia spp., Annickia chlorantha, Eremomastax speciosa, Bryophyllum spp. and Physostigma venenosum.

The botanical garden also houses a herbarium which held around 21,000 specimens in 2001 and, more recently, 30,000. Its acronym in the Index Herbariorum is SCA.

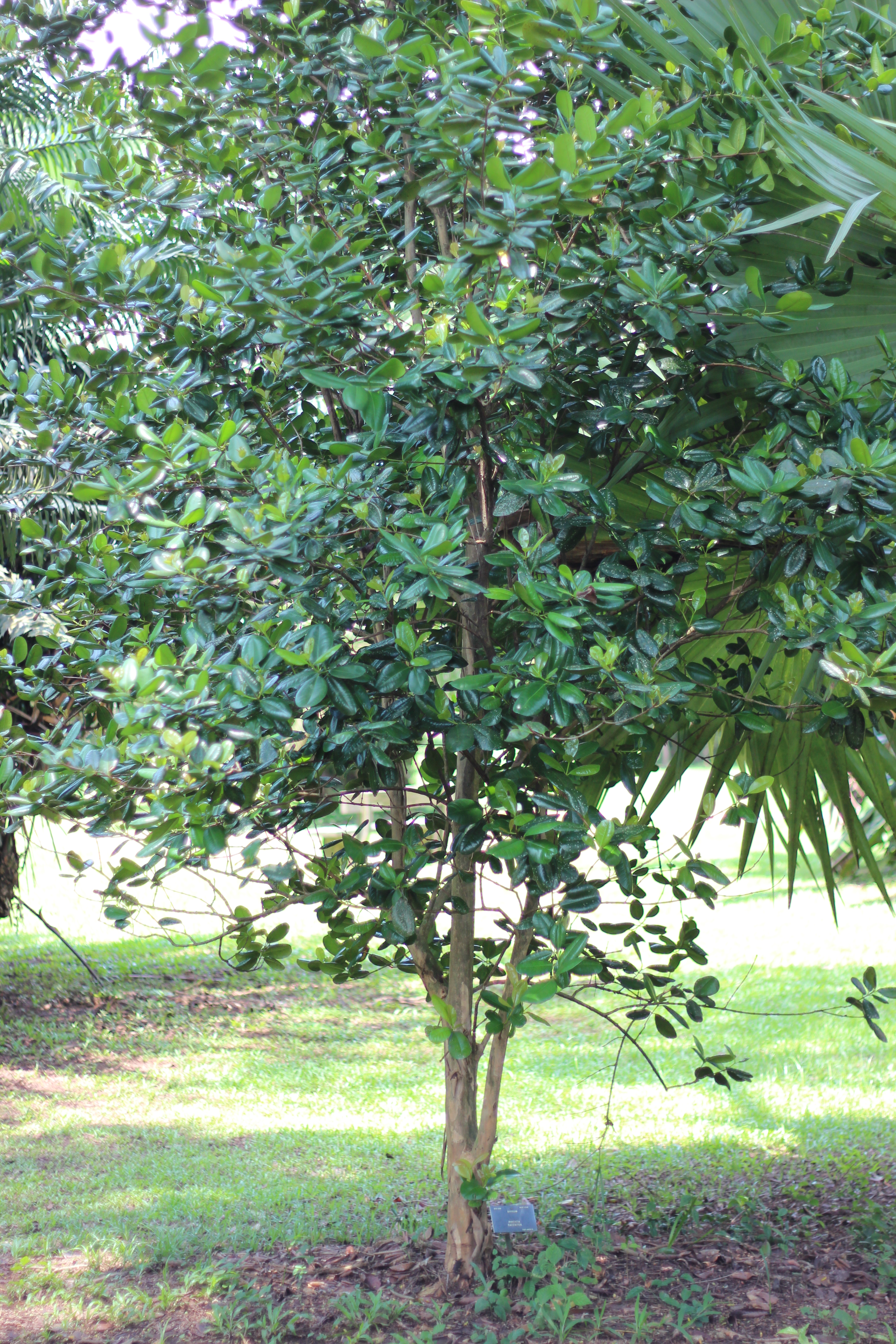
Pimenta racemosa

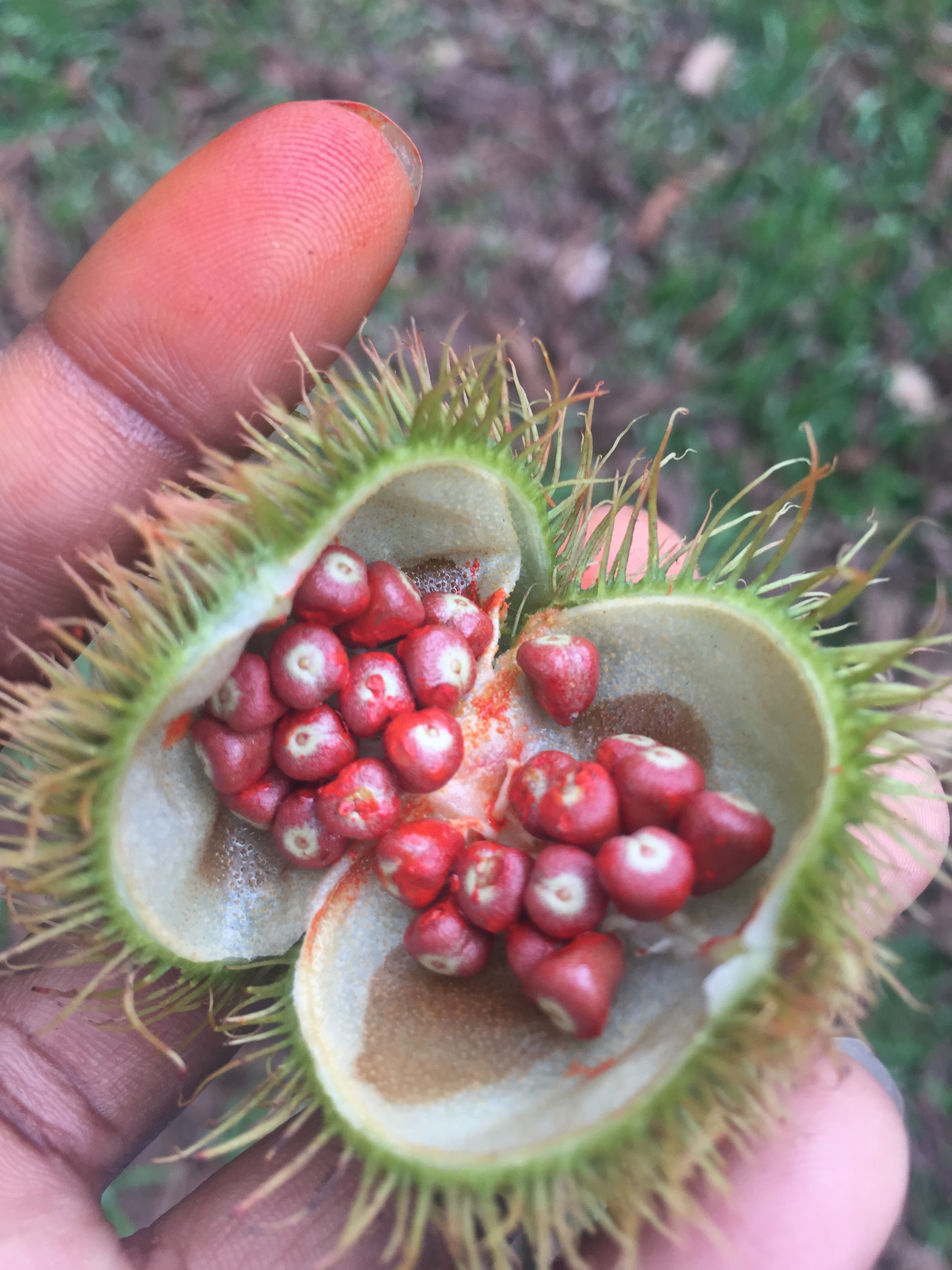
Bixa orellana

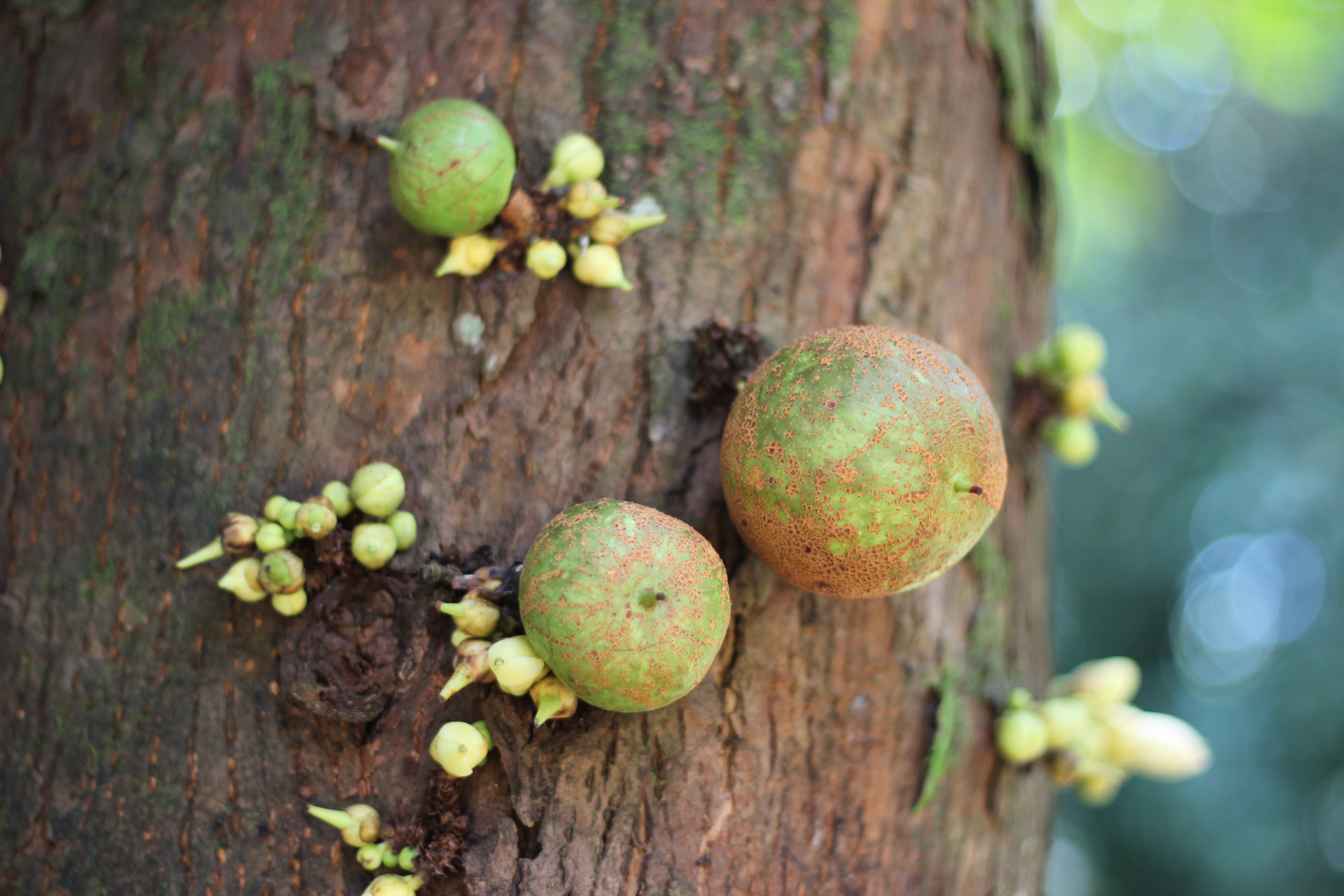
Omphalocarpum procerum

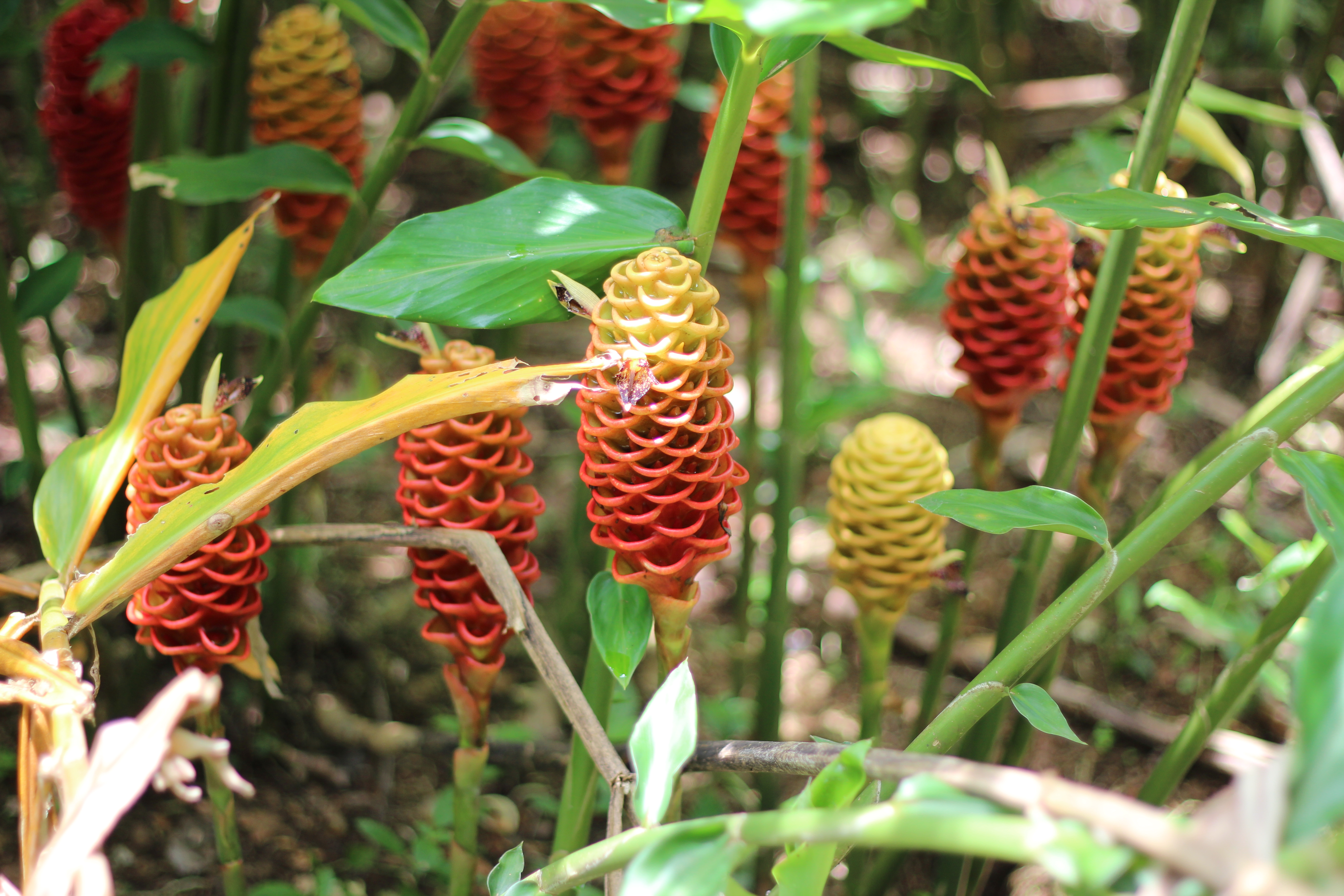
Tapeinochilos ananassae
D'autres variétés rencontrées

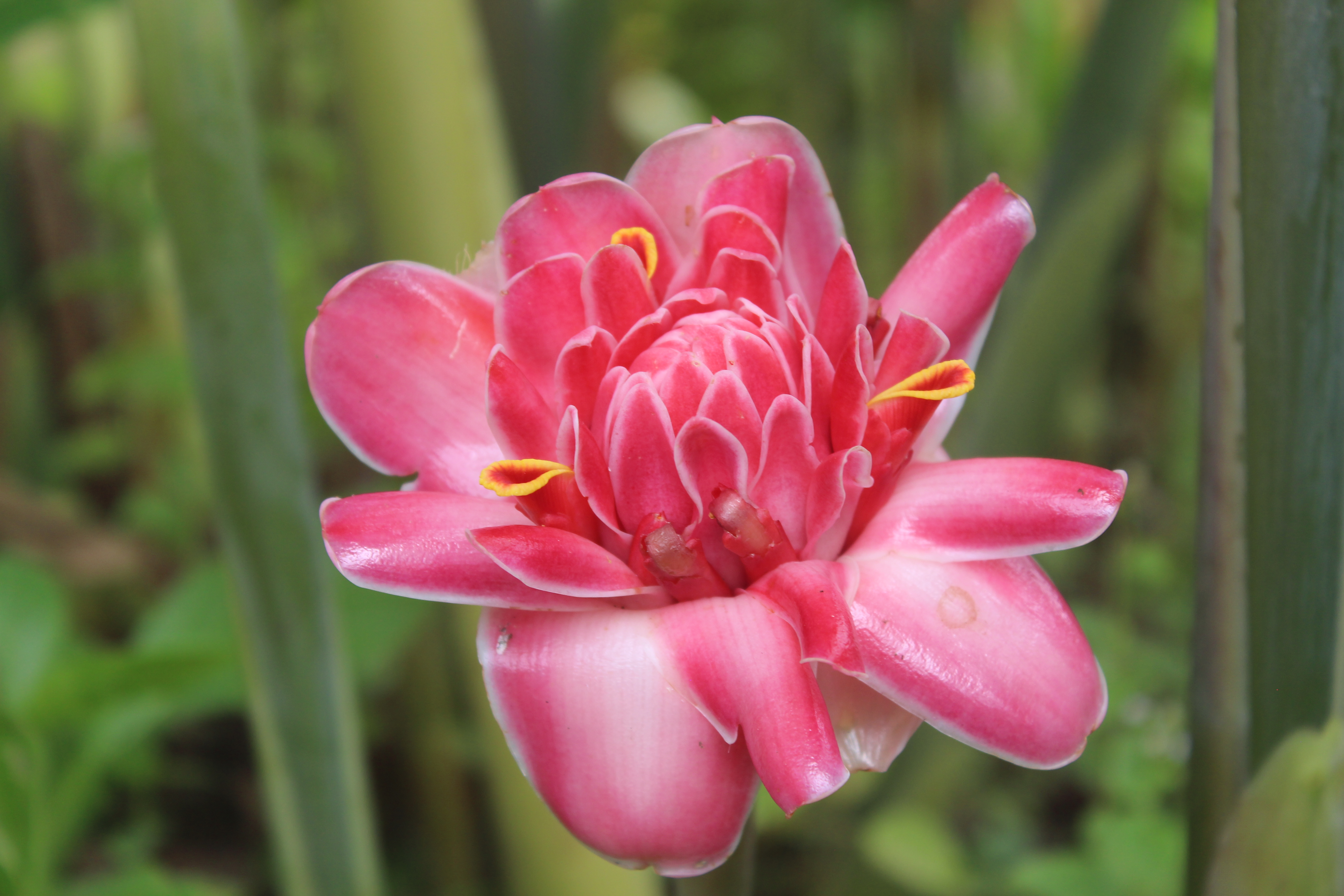
Etlingera elatior

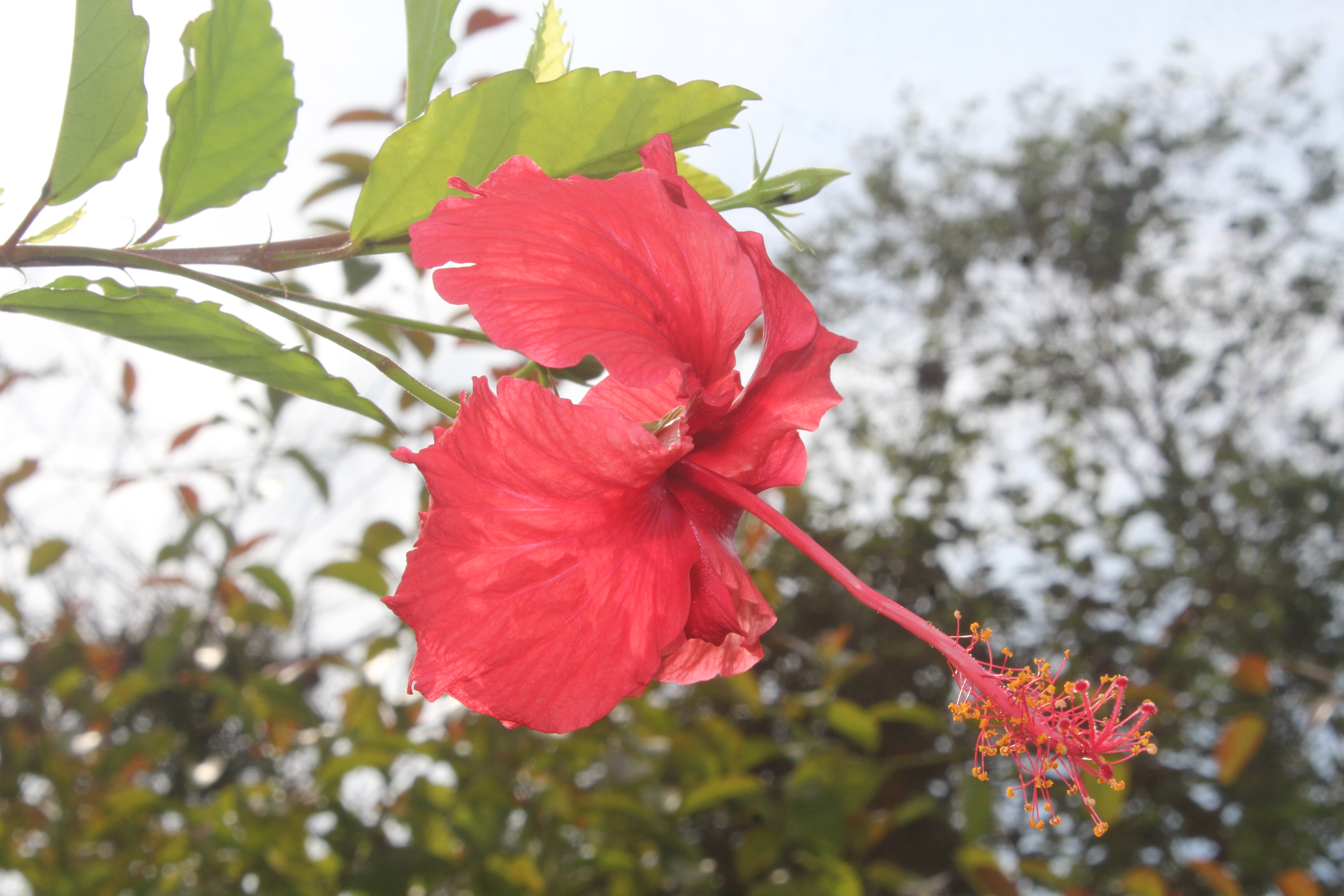
Hibiscus rosa-sinensis

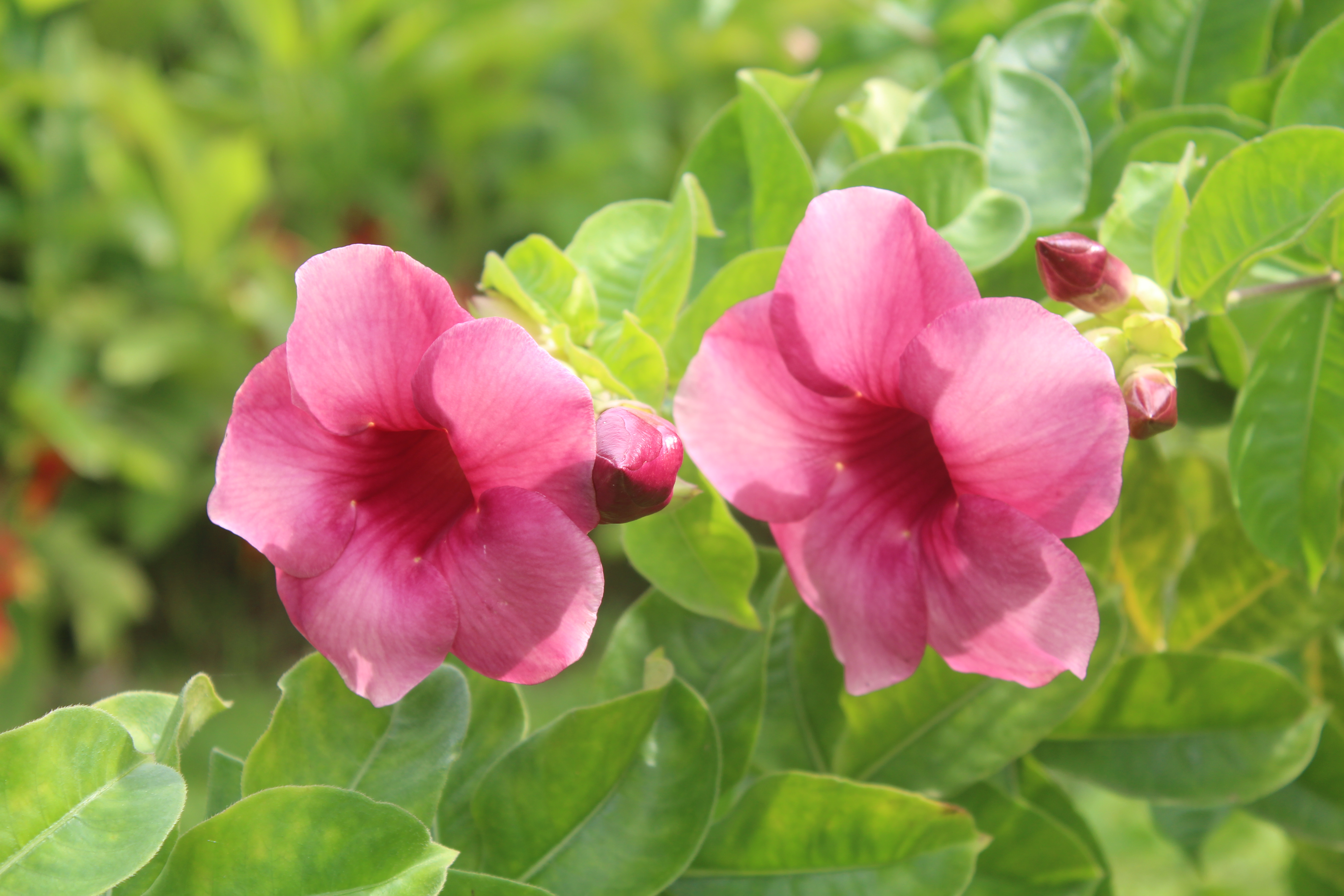
Mandevilla sanderi

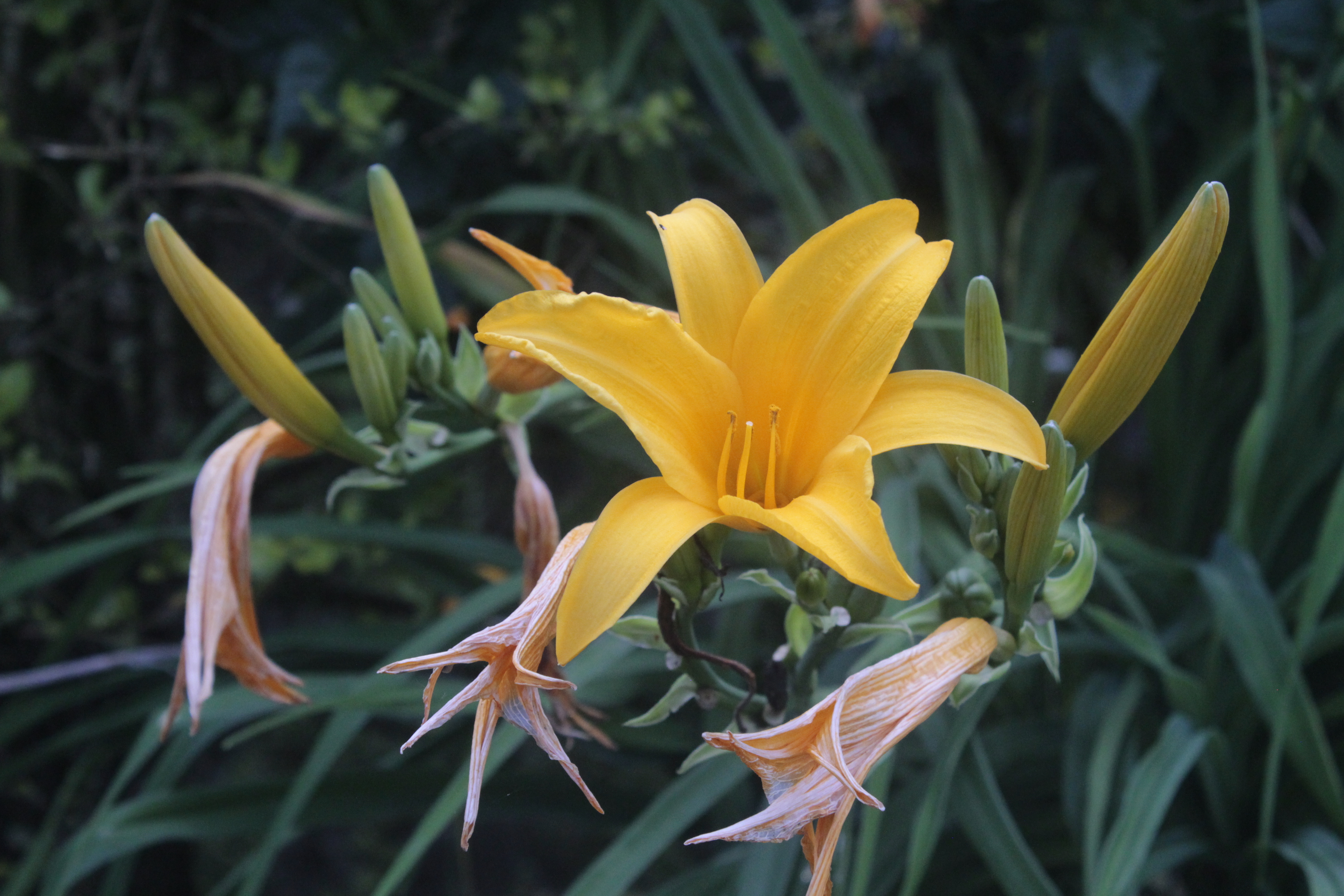
Lily Lilium

== Military cemetery ==
The Botanical Garden houses the graves of several soldiers from the Commonwealth of Nations, four from World War I and sixteen from World War II.

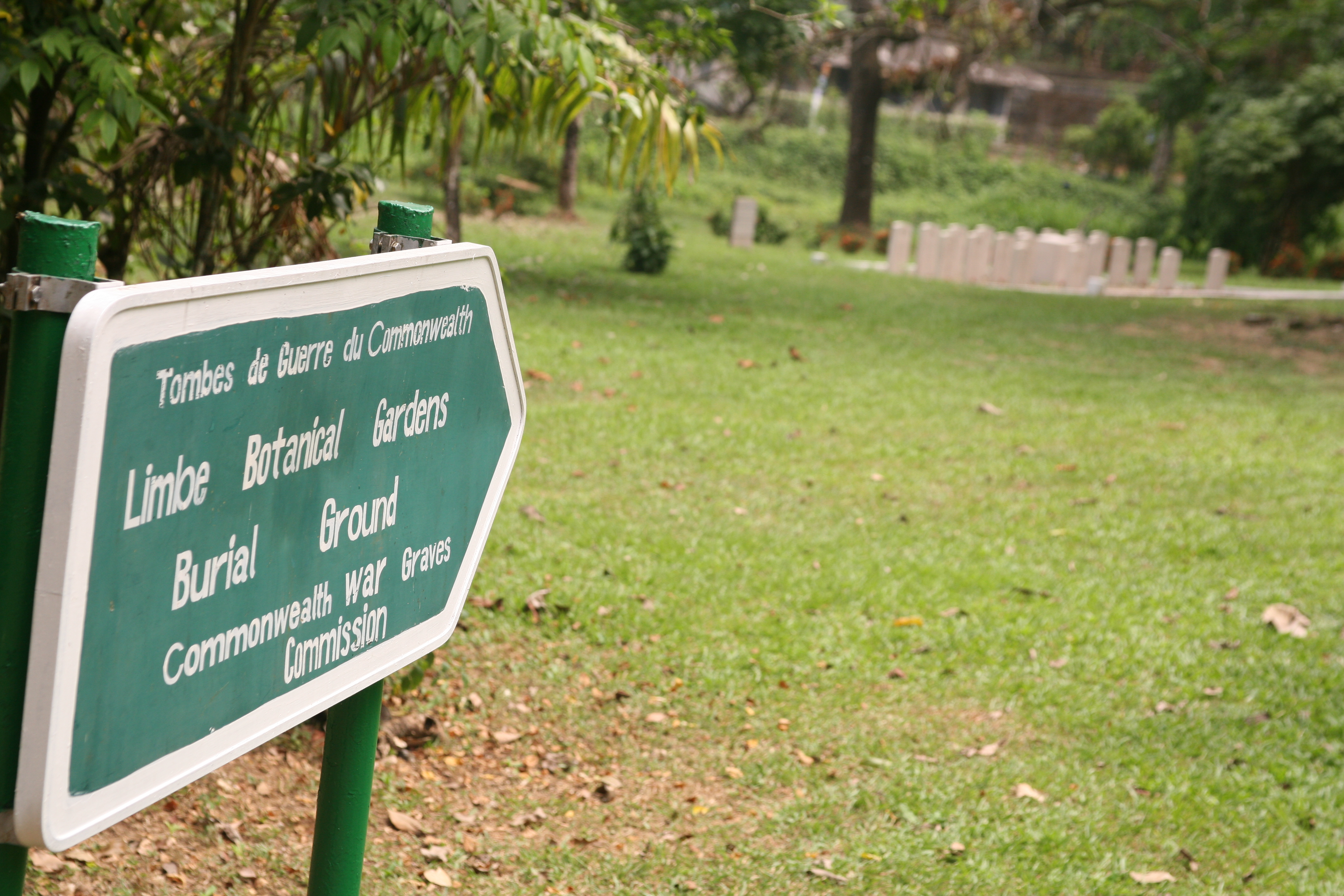

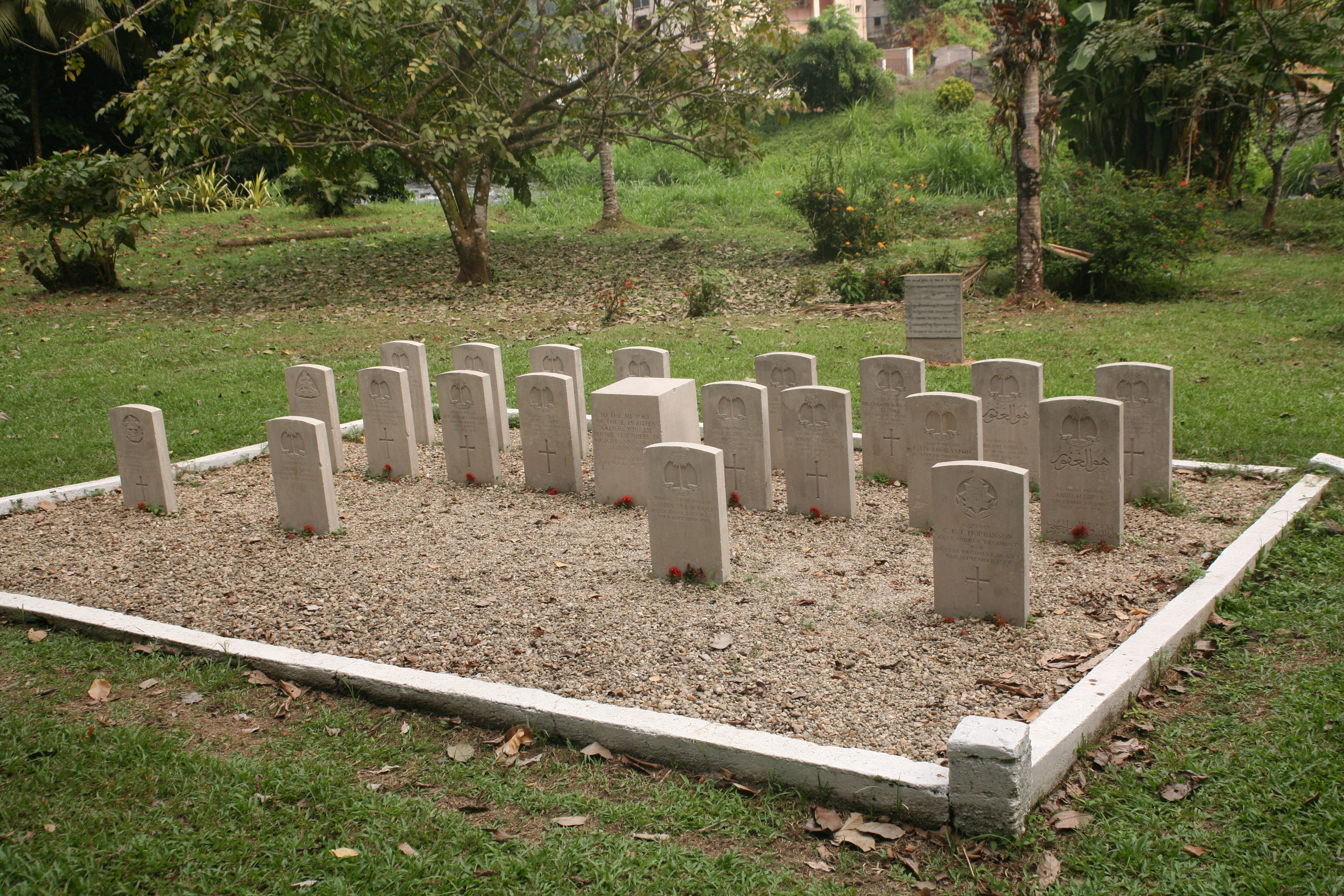

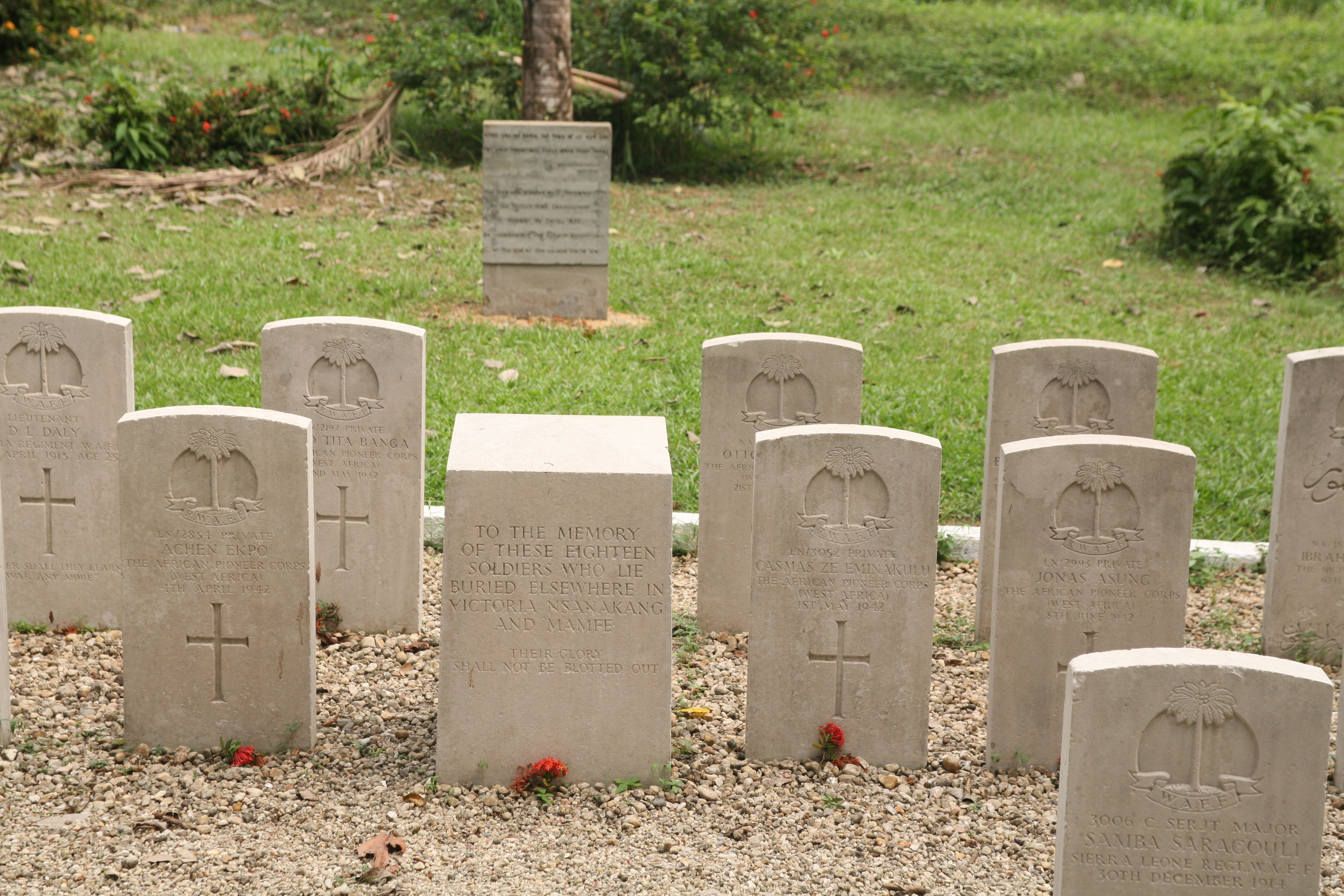

== Tourism ==
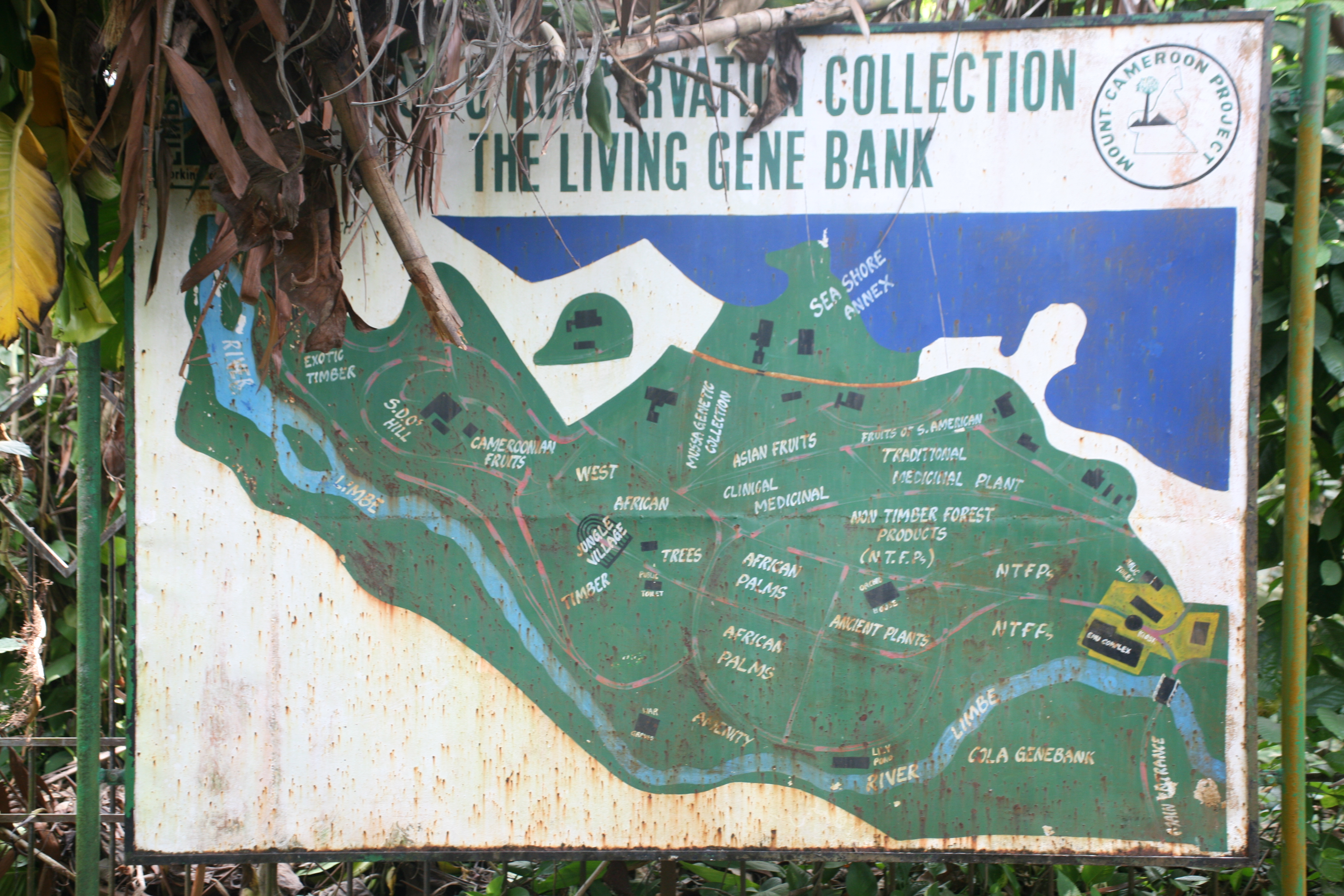
Plan of the garden

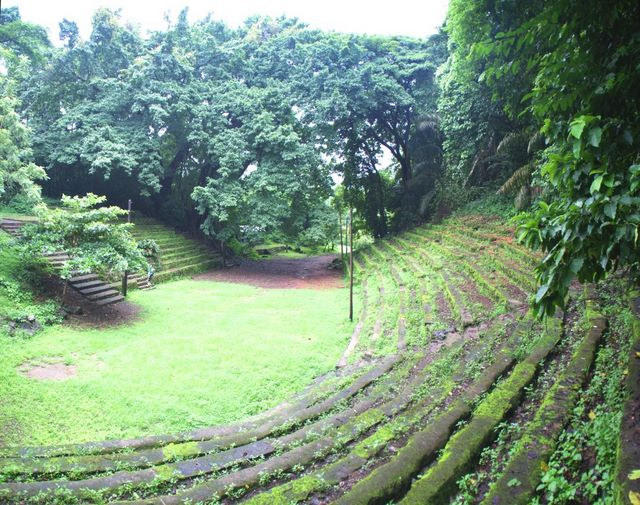
Jungle Theatre

A centre of attraction called "Jungle Village" has been set up and serves as a framework for the organisation of cultural events for the enjoyment of tourists. Several landscaped tracks facilitate access within the garden. These are :

- the coastal track, which affords a view of the western part of the garden;
- the biodiversity trail which, as its name suggests, allows visitors to have a view of all the biodiversity of the garden;
- the Bota trail to discover large trees and wild animals;
- the track that runs along the river, where there are trees and plants over a hundred years old.

== Bibliography ==
- Hepper, F. Nigel (1989). Larsen, Kai; Morley, Brian; Schoser, Gustav (eds.). Limbe (Victoria) Botanic Gardens, SW Cameroon. Koch: International Association of Botanical Gardens. pp. 75–85.
- Engler, Adolf (17 January 1900). "Victoria und Buea in Kamerun als zukünftige botanische Tropenstationen". Notizblatt des Königlichen botanischen Gartens und Museums zu Berlin (in German). 3 (21): 1–3. doi:10.2307/3994162. JSTOR 3994162.
- Laird, Sarah A. (1996). Howe, Sylvia (ed.). Medicinal Plants of the Limbe Botanic Garden. illustrated by Karen Sidwell. Mount Cameroon Project. OCLC 70217811. 80 pages.
- Diderot, Serge; Nguepjouo, M., eds. (2003). "Le Jardin botanique". Étude des performances touristiques de la région du Mont Fako, Province du Sud-Ouest, Cameroun (Maîtrise) (in French). Université de Ngaoundéré Cameroun.
- Oldfield, Sara (2008). Great botanic gardens of the world. London: New Holland. ISBN 978-1-84537-593-5. (preface by Charles, Prince of Wales)
