= Voacamine =

Chemical compound

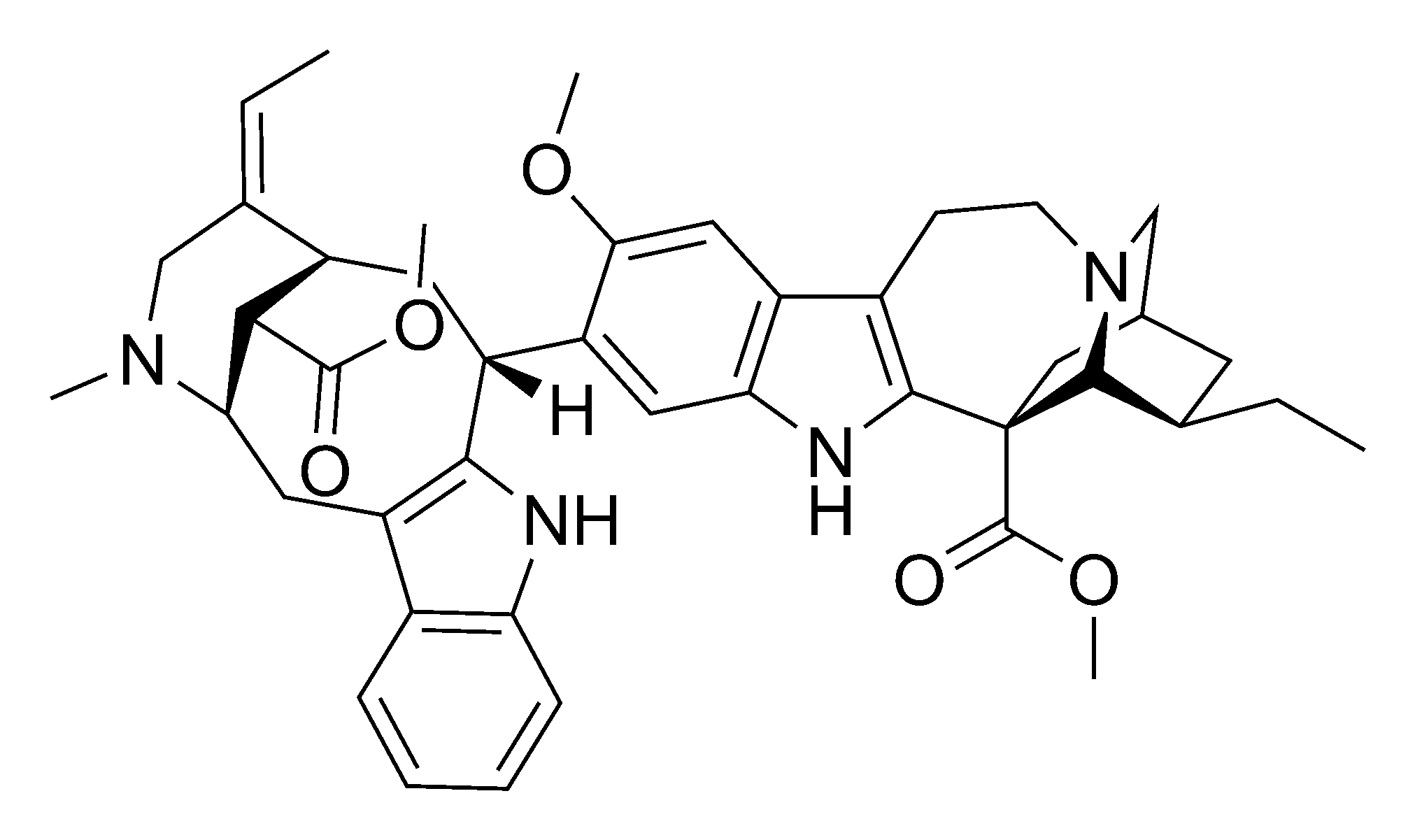

Identifiers
- IUPAC name: (6R,6aR,7R,11S)-methyl 7-ethyl-3-((2R,6S,8R,14S,E)-5-ethylidene-14-(methoxycarbonyl)-3-methyl-2,3,4,5,6,7,8,9-octahydro-1H-2,6-methanoazecino[5,4-b]indol-8-yl)-2-methoxy-6,6a,7,8,9,10,12,13-octahydro-5H-6,9-methanopyrido[1',2':1,2]azepino[4,5-b]indole-6-carboxylate
- CAS Number: 3371-85-5
- PubChem CID: 11953931
- DrugBank: DB04877
- ChemSpider: 30808559
- UNII: 2Z504YT5AG
- ChEMBL: ChEMBL445022
- CompTox Dashboard (EPA): DTXSID20863159
- ECHA InfoCard: 100.020.139

Chemical and physical data
- Formula: C_{43}H_{52}N_{4}O_{5}
- Molar mass: 704.912 g·mol^{−1}
- 3D model (JSmol): Interactive image
- SMILES: CCC1CC2CC3(C1N(C2)CCC4=C3NC5=CC(=C(C=C45)OC)C6CC\7C(C(CC8=C6NC9=CC=CC=C89)N(C/C7=C/C)C)C(=O)OC)C(=O)OC
- InChI: InChI=1S/C43H52N4O5/c1-7-24-15-23-20-43(42(49)52-6)39-27(13-14-47(21-23)40(24)43)29-19-36(50-4)30(17-34(29)45-39)31-16-28-25(8-2)22-46(3)35(37(28)41(48)51-5)18-32-26-11-9-10-12-33(26)44-38(31)32/h8-12,17,19,23-24,28,31,35,37,40,44-45H,7,13-16,18,20-22H2,1-6H3/b25-8-/t23-,24+,28-,31+,35-,37-,40-,43-/m0/s1; Key:VCMIRXRRQJNZJT-XBBWQDJOSA-N

Voacamine, also known under the older names voacanginine and vocamine, is a naturally occurring dimeric indole alkaloid of the secologanin type, found in a number of plants, including Voacanga africana and Tabernaemontana divaricata. It is approved for use as an antimalarial drug in several African countries. Voacamine exhibits cannabinoid CB1 receptor antagonistic activity.

== Chemistry ==
=== Structure ===
There is considerable confusion about the absolute stereochemical configuration of voacamine and the originally published absolute structure had to be later revised. It has an ibogaine unit joined with vobasine unit.

== Adverse Effect ==
Voacamine can cause hypertension in high dose.

== See also ==
- Vincamine
- Voacangine
- Vobtusine
