= LIH383 =

Opioid receptor modulator

Clinical data
- Other names: LIH-383; FGGFMRRK-NH_{2}; L-Phenylalanylglycylglycyl-L-phenylalanyl-L-methionyl-N^{5}-(diaminomethylene)-L-ornithyl-N^{5}-(diaminomethylene)-L-ornithyl-L-lysine

Identifiers
- IUPAC name: (2S)-6-amino-2-[[(2S)-2-[[(2S)-2-[[(2S)-2-[[(2S)-2-[[2-[[2-[[(2S)-2-amino-3-phenylpropanoyl]amino]acetyl]amino]acetyl]amino]-3-phenylpropanoyl]amino]-4-methylsulfanylbutanoyl]amino]-5-(diaminomethylideneamino)pentanoyl]amino]-5-(diaminomethylideneamino)pentanoyl]amino]hexanamide
- CAS Number: 2866266-58-0
- PubChem CID: 168287525
- ChemSpider: 129306945
- ChEMBL: ChEMBL5194677

Chemical and physical data
- Formula: C_{45}H_{72}N_{16}O_{8}S
- Molar mass: 997.24 g·mol^{−1}
- 3D model (JSmol): Interactive image
- SMILES: CSCC[C@@H](C(=O)N[C@@H](CCCN=C(N)N)C(=O)N[C@@H](CCCN=C(N)N)C(=O)N[C@@H](CCCCN)C(=O)N)NC(=O)[C@H](CC1=CC=CC=C1)NC(=O)CNC(=O)CNC(=O)[C@H](CC2=CC=CC=C2)N
- InChI: InChI=1S/C45H72N16O8S/c1-70-23-19-34(61-43(69)35(25-29-14-6-3-7-15-29)57-37(63)27-55-36(62)26-56-39(65)30(47)24-28-12-4-2-5-13-28)42(68)60-33(18-11-22-54-45(51)52)41(67)59-32(17-10-21-53-44(49)50)40(66)58-31(38(48)64)16-8-9-20-46/h2-7,12-15,30-35H,8-11,16-27,46-47H2,1H3,(H2,48,64)(H,55,62)(H,56,65)(H,57,63)(H,58,66)(H,59,67)(H,60,68)(H,61,69)(H4,49,50,53)(H4,51,52,54)/t30-,31-,32-,33-,34-,35-/m0/s1; Key:HKVZPBVWPFDBBQ-LBBUGJAGSA-N

LIH383 is an octapeptide and highly potent and selective agonist of the atypical chemokine receptor ACKR3 (CXCR7) that was derived from the opioid peptide adrenorphin. ACKR3 is a novel opioid receptor which functions as a broad-spectrum trap or scavenger for endogenous opioid peptides, including enkephalins, dynorphins, and nociceptin, and thereby acts as a negative modulator of the opioid system. By displacing them from ACKR3 and thereby increasing their availability, LIH383 potentiates the actions of endogenous opioids, for instance their analgesic effects. Other ligands of ACKR3 include conolidine, CCX771, RTI-5152-12, and VUF15485.
