= Scavenger receptor =

Scavenger receptor may refer to:

- Scavenger receptor (immunology)
- Scavenger receptor (endocrinology)
