= C17H18N2O =

The molecular formula C_{17}H_{18}N_{2}O (molar mass: 266.34 g/mol, exact mass: 266.1419 u) may refer to:

- 4-HO-NBnT (4-hydroxy-N-benzyltryptamine)
- 5-Benzyloxytryptamine (5-BT)
- Conolidine
- Ervaticine
