= C21H28N2O =

The molecular formula C_{21}H_{28}N_{2}O may refer to:

- Denatonium
- Diampromide
- RTI-5152-12
