= Conophylline =

Names
- IUPAC name Dimethyl 14,25-diethyl-24,33-dihydroxy-31,32-dimethoxy-12,22-dioxa-1,9,18,29-tetrazadodecacyclo[23.13.1.1^{6,9}.0^{2,23}.0^{3,21}.0^{5,19}.0^{6,17}.0^{11,13}.0^{28,36}.0^{30,35}.0^{36,39}.0^{14,40}]tetraconta-3,5(19),16,20,27,30,32,34-octaene-16,27-dicarboxylate

Identifiers
CAS Number	Conophylline: 142741-24-0
3D model (JSmol)	Conophylline: Interactive image
ChEMBL	Conophylline: ChEMBL506768; Conophyllidine: ChEMBL455807
ChemSpider	Conophylline: 23339619; Conophyllidine: 17596709
PubChem CID	Conophylline: 9853848; Conophyllidine: 44566831
- InChI: InChI=1S/C44H50N4O10/c1-7-41-16-20(37(51)55-5)34-44(23-14-25(49)30(53-3)31(54-4)28(23)46-34)10-12-48(40(41)44)29-19-13-22-24(15-26(19)57-32(29)35(41)50)45-33-21(38(52)56-6)17-42(8-2)36-27(58-36)18-47-11-9-43(22,33)39(42)47/h13-15,27,29,32,35-36,39-40,45-46,49-50H,7-12,16-18H2,1-6H3 Key: QZRIMAMDGWAHPQ-UHFFFAOYSA-N
- SMILES: Conophylline: CCC12CC(=C3C4(C1N(CC4)C5C(C2O)OC6=CC7=C(C=C56)C89CCN1C8C(CC(=C9N7)C(=O)OC)(C2C(C1)O2)CC)C1=CC(=C(C(=C1N3)OC)OC)O)C(=O)OC

Properties
Chemical formula	C_{44}H_{50}N_{4}O_{10}
Molar mass	794.902 g·mol^{−1}
- Except where otherwise noted, data are given for materials in their standard state (at 25 °C [77 °F], 100 kPa). Infobox references

Conophylline is a autophagy inducing vinca alkaloid found in plants of the genus Tabernaemontana. Among the many functional groups in this molecule is an epoxide: the compound where that ring is replaced with a double bond is called conophyllidine and this co-occurs in the same plants.

== History ==
Conophylline and conophyllidine were first reported in 1993 after isolation from the ethanol extract of leaves of Tabernaemontana divaricata. Their structures were confirmed by X-ray crystallography. The class of vinca alkaloids to which these compounds belong also contains vincristine and vinblastine, well-known therapeutic agents for human cancers, so they were candidates for a number of biochemical assays to see if they had useful biological activity. By 1996, conophylline it had been reported to inhibit tumours in rats by its action on Ras-expressing cells. This finding did not lead to a useful drug but the molecule continues to be investigated for its biological properties.

== Synthesis ==
=== Biosynthesis ===
As with other Indole alkaloids, the biosynthesis of conophylline and conophyllidine starts from the amino acid tryptophan. This is converted into strictosidine before further elaboration and dimerisation.

=== Chemical synthesis ===
The natural products contain two indoline ring systems

Fukuyama and coworkers published a total synthesis of conophylline and conophyllidine in 2011. Their strategy was to couple two indoline-containing fragments using a type of Polonovski reaction. The synthesis was challenging owing to the eleven stereogenic centers which have to be controlled. The final products are chiral, and laevorotary.

== Natural occurrence ==
Conophylline and conophyllidine are found in species of the genus Tabernaemontana including Ervatamia microphylla and Tabernaemontana divaricata. The latter species is known to produce many other alkaloids including catharanthine, ibogamine and voacristine.

== See also ==
- Conofoline
