= Conofoline =

Names
- Preferred IUPAC name Methyl (1aS,1′aS,1bS,1′bS,1b^{1}R,1′b^{1}R,3aS,8bS,8′bR,12′R,12aR,12′aR)-1b,1′b-diethyl-7′-hydroxy-5′,6′-dimethoxy-4-methyl-1a,1′a,1b,1′b,1b^{1},1′b^{1},2,2′,3,3a,4,4′,9,9′,10,10′,12a,12′a-octadecahydro-12H,12′H-[7,12′-bioxireno[2′,3′:6,7]indolizino[8,1-cd]carbazole]-3′-carboxylate

Identifiers
3D model (JSmol)	Interactive image
ChEMBL	ChEMBL2409161
ChemSpider	30824499
PubChem CID	15215005
- InChI: InChI=1S/C43H52N4O7/c1-7-40-12-11-28-42(13-15-46(38(40)42)20-27-35(40)53-27)23-17-21(9-10-25(23)45(28)3)30-33-36(54-33)41(8-2)19-22(37(49)52-6)34-43(14-16-47(30)39(41)43)24-18-26(48)31(50-4)32(51-5)29(24)44-34/h9-10,17-18,27-28,30,33,35-36,38-39,44,48H,7-8,11-16,19-20H2,1-6H3/t27-,28+,30-,33-,35-,36-,38+,39+,40-,41-,42+,43+/m1/s1 Key: AXBZVPIBJWOFHO-XMONSFOZSA-N
- SMILES: CC[C@]12CC[C@H]3[C@@]4([C@H]1N(CC4)C[C@@H]5[C@H]2O5)C6=C(N3C)C=CC(=C6)[C@@H]7[C@@H]8[C@@H](O8)[C@]9(CC(=C1[C@@]2([C@H]9N7CC2)C2=CC(=C(C(=C2N1)OC)OC)O)C(=O)OC)CC

Properties
Chemical formula	C_{43}H_{52}N_{4}O_{7}
Molar mass	736.910 g·mol^{−1}
- Except where otherwise noted, data are given for materials in their standard state (at 25 °C [77 °F], 100 kPa). Infobox references

Conofoline is an alkaloid of the vinca alkaloid class which is closely related to conophylline. It is found in the leaves of some species in the genus Tabernaemontana, including Tabernaemontana divaricata, and in Ervatamia peduncularis.

== See also ==
- Conolidine
- Conopharyngine
