= RTI-5152-12 =

Synthetic opioid modulator

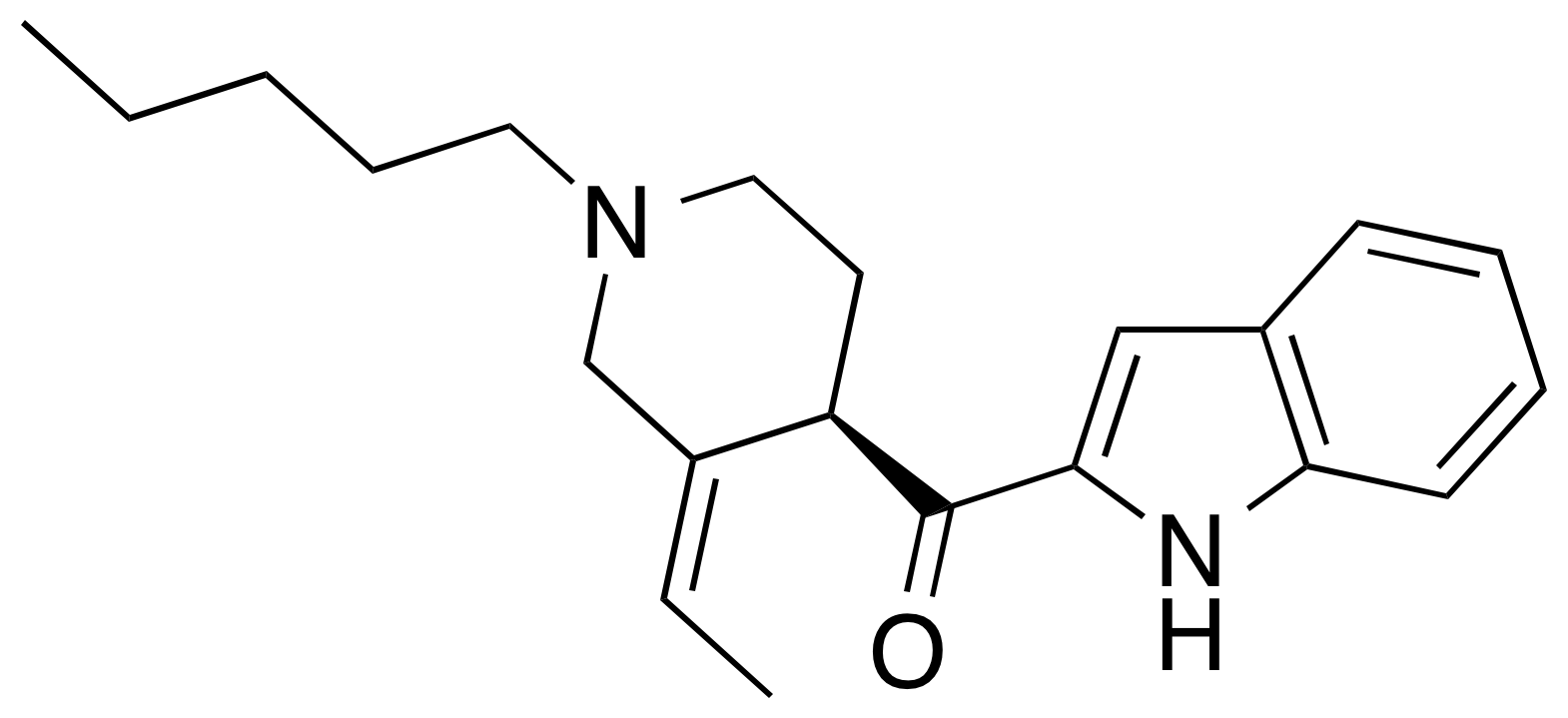

Clinical data
- Other names: WW-12 (patent)
- Drug class: ACKR3 (CXCR7) agonist; Opioid modulator

Identifiers
- IUPAC name: [(3E,4R)-3-ethylidene-1-pentylpiperidin-4-yl]-(1H-indol-2-yl)methanone
- CAS Number: 2794983-92-7
- PubChem CID: 155927823

Chemical and physical data
- Formula: C_{21}H_{28}N_{2}O
- Molar mass: 324.468 g·mol^{−1}
- 3D model (JSmol): Interactive image
- SMILES: CCCCCN1CC[C@H](/C(=C\C)/C1)C(=O)C2=CC3=CC=CC=C3N2
- InChI: InChI=1S/C21H28N2O/c1-3-5-8-12-23-13-11-18(16(4-2)15-23)21(24)20-14-17-9-6-7-10-19(17)22-20/h4,6-7,9-10,14,18,22H,3,5,8,11-13,15H2,1-2H3/b16-4-/t18-/m1/s1; Key:MUZOMTWDNLINCG-QBSXKKPKSA-N

RTI-5152-12, or WW-12 (in patent), is a synthetic small-molecule agonist of the atypical chemokine receptor ACKR3 (CXCR7) that was derived from the naturally occurring alkaloid conolidine. RTI-5152-12 has 15-fold improved potency towards ACKR3 relative to conolidine.

ACKR3 is a novel opioid receptor which functions as a broad-spectrum trap or scavenger for endogenous opioid peptides, including enkephalins, dynorphins, and nociceptin. The receptor acts as a negative modulator of the opioid system by decreasing the availability of opioid peptides for their classical receptors like the μ-opioid receptor. Ligands of ACKR3, by competitively displacing endogenous opioid peptides from ACKR3, can potentiate the actions of these endogenous opioids and produce effects like analgesia and anxiolysis in animals.

RTI-5152-12 is being developed as a potential pharmaceutical drug and, as of December 2021, is in the preclinical stage of development for treatment of pain. The chemical structure was not disclosed until a patent was published in June 2022.

== See also ==
- LIH383
