= Atypical chemokine receptor 3 =

Protein found in humans

ACKR3

Identifiers
- Aliases: ACKR3, CMKOR1, CXC-R7, CXCR-7, CXCR7, GPR159, RDC-1, RDC1, atypical chemokine receptor 3
- External IDs: OMIM: 610376; MGI: 109562; GeneCards: ACKR3
Available structures
PDB	Ortholog search: PDBe RCSB
PDB	List of PDB id codes 7SK6, 7SK5

Gene location (Human)
Chr.	Chromosome 2 (human)
Band	2q37.3	Start	236,567,787 bp
Band	2q37.3	End	236,582,354 bp

Gene location (Mouse)
Chr.	Chromosome 1 (mouse)
Band	1 D|1 45.28 cM	Start	90,131,702 bp
Band	1 D|1 45.28 cM	End	90,144,473 bp
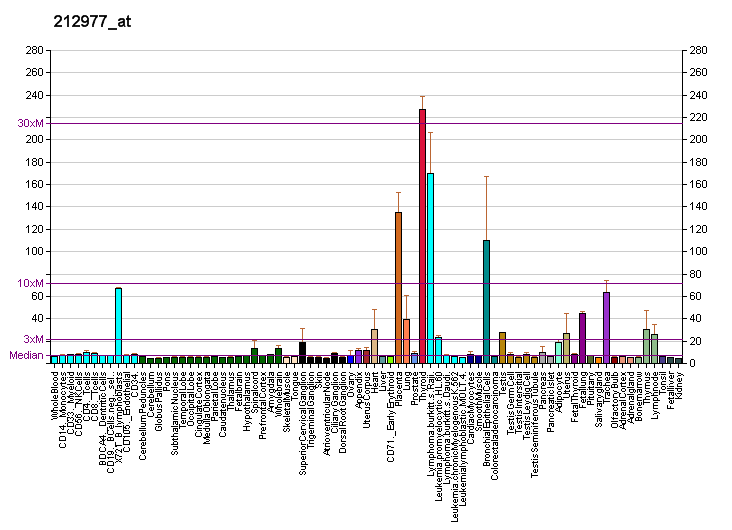
RNA expression pattern
Bgee	Human / Mouse (ortholog); Top expressed in: synovial joint; vena cava; tendon of biceps brachii; cartilage tissue; skin of hip; saphenous vein; pericardium; synovial membrane; tibial arteries; mucosa of paranasal sinus / Top expressed in: medial ganglionic eminence; renal corpuscle; medullary collecting duct; endocardial cushion; aortic valve; stria vascularis; ascending aorta; ciliary body; myocardium of ventricle; iris; More reference expression data
BioGPS	More reference expression data
Gene ontology
Molecular function	C-X-C chemokine receptor activity; G protein-coupled receptor activity; coreceptor activity; C-X-C chemokine binding; signal transducer activity; chemokine binding; scavenger receptor activity; protein binding; C-C chemokine receptor activity; C-C chemokine binding
Cellular component	cytoplasm; integral component of membrane; recycling endosome; endosome; intracellular membrane-bounded organelle; membrane; plasma membrane; cell surface; early endosome; perinuclear region of cytoplasm; clathrin-coated pit; nucleus; external side of plasma membrane
Biological process	chemokine-mediated signaling pathway; receptor internalization; negative regulation of intrinsic apoptotic signaling pathway in response to DNA damage; vasculogenesis; multicellular organism development; chemotaxis; cell adhesion; angiogenesis; positive regulation of ERK1 and ERK2 cascade; viral process; signal transduction; positive regulation of mesenchymal stem cell migration; G protein-coupled receptor signaling pathway; immune response; positive regulation of cytosolic calcium ion concentration; calcium-mediated signaling; cell chemotaxis
Sources:Amigo / QuickGO
Orthologs
Databases	NCBI: entry; OMA: entry
Species	Human	Mouse
Entrez	57007	12778
Ensembl	ENSG00000144476	ENSMUSG00000044337
UniProt	P25106	P56485
RefSeq (mRNA)	NM_001047841; NM_020311	NM_001271607; NM_007722
RefSeq (protein)	NP_064707	NP_001258536; NP_031748
Location (UCSC)	Chr 2: 236.57 – 236.58 Mb	Chr 1: 90.13 – 90.14 Mb
PubMed search
- Wikidata
View/Edit Human	View/Edit Mouse

Atypical chemokine receptor 3 is a protein that in humans is encoded by the ACKR3 gene (previously CMKOR1 or CXCR7).

This gene encodes a G protein-coupled receptor family member. It belongs to the chemokine receptor family of GPCRs. Within this family, ACKR3 is classified as a class A GPCR. This GPCR protein was earlier thought to be a receptor for vasoactive intestinal peptide (VIP) and was considered to be an orphan receptor. It is now classified as a chemokine receptor able to bind the chemokines CXCL12/SDF-1 and CXCL11. The protein is also a coreceptor for human immunodeficiency viruses (HIV). Translocations involving this gene and HMGA2 on chromosome 12 have been observed in lipomas. Alternatively spliced transcript variants encoding the same protein isoform have been found for this gene. Whereas some reports claim that the receptor induces signaling following ligand binding, recent findings in zebrafish suggest that CXCR7 functions primarily by sequestering the chemokine CXCL12.

Another study has provided evidence that ligand binding to CXCR7 activates MAP kinases through Beta-arrestins, and thus has functions beyond ligand sequestration.

ACKR3 has also been shown to sequester endogenous opioid peptides and is thought to modulate their activity.

== Nomenclature ==
In 2013, the Nomenclature and Standards Committee of the International Union of Basic and Clinical Pharmacology subcommittee for chemokine receptors reevaluated C-X-C chemokine receptor type 7 (CXCR7) and classified it as an atypical chemokine receptor, leading to its renaming as atypical chemokine receptor 3 (ACKR3). Additional names that have been mentioned in the literature, albeit less frequently, include GPR159 and Orphan receptor RDC1, the latter being a term primarily found in older literature.

== Function ==
ACKR3 stands out as an atypical receptor due to its β-arrestin-biased signaling nature. In the case of a β-arrestin-biased receptor like ACKR3, when it is treated with an unbiased ligand, it triggers signaling pathways solely mediated by β-arrestin. What sets ACKR3 apart is its absence of G-protein involvement, which distinguishes it from typical GPCRs.

Despite being considered atypical, the functions of ACKR3 do not imply that it acts as a completely inactive receptor for CXCL12. On the contrary, extensive literature supports the notion of ACKR3 engaging in active signaling, which is believed to rely on arrestin-mediated mechanisms. Nevertheless, its role as a decoy receptor for CXCL12/SDF1 is well-established. This is evident by the significantly higher affinity of CXCL12 binding to ACKR3/CXCR7 compared to CXCR4, along with its constant internalization facilitated by the recruitment of β-arrestin, without known downstream signaling events.

== Ligands ==
In addition to CXCL12, ACKR3 engages with multiple ligands, encompassing CXCL11, macrophage inhibitory factor (MIF), adrenomedullin (ADM), opioid peptides such as nociceptin, dynorphin, and enkephalin, as well as the viral chemokine vCCL2/viral macrophage inflammatory protein-II.

Inhibition of ACKR3 by ligands such as the peptide LIH383 (FGGFMRRK-NH_{2}) and the small molecules conolidine, RTI-5152-12, and VUF15485 increases opioid peptide activity and produces analgesic and antidepressant effects in animal studies.

== Interactions ==
ACKR3 and CXCR4 have been shown to interact, different possibilities regarding the involvement of ACKR3 and CXCR4 in CXCL12 signaling:

A) ACKR3 can attenuate CXCR4 signaling by forming heterodimers with CXCR4. While this interaction was initially observed in cells with CXCR7 overexpression, it has rarely been observed with endogenous CXCR7.

B) Multiple cell types demonstrate that either ACKR3 or CXCR4 controls specific cell functions (e.g., migration, proliferation). The distinct regulation of these functions occurs through one of the receptors.

C) Synergistic effects between CXCR4 and ACKR3 have been observed in many cases, suggesting that cellular responses to CXCL12 require the presence of both receptors. Whether receptor heterodimerization is responsible for these synergistic effects remains uncertain.

D) In addition to synergistic effects, a few studies have shown additive effects of ACKR3 and CXCR4 on specific cell functions. However, it has not been experimentally tested whether receptor heterodimerization is necessary for these additive effects. E) Within specific cell types, CXCR4, ACKR3, and CXCR4/ACKR3 heterodimers control distinct cell functions. This pattern appears to be a common arrangement of the CXCL12 system in various types of stem and progenitor cells.

== See also ==
- Duffy antigen system (ACKR1)
- Atypical chemokine receptor 2
- Atypical chemokine receptor 4
- Atypical chemokine receptor 5
