= Atypical chemokine receptor 5 =

Protein-coding gene in humans

ACKR5

Identifiers
- Aliases: ACKR5, 7TMR, ADMR, AM-R, AMR, G10D, gamrh, hrhAMR, G protein-coupled receptor 182, L1-R, GPR182
- External IDs: OMIM: 605307; MGI: 109545; GeneCards: ACKR5

Gene location (Human)
Chr.	Chromosome 12 (human)
Band	12q13.3	Start	56,994,492 bp
Band	12q13.3	End	56,998,447 bp

Gene location (Mouse)
Chr.	Chromosome 10 (mouse)
Band	10 D3|10 75.07 cM	Start	127,583,145 bp
Band	10 D3|10 75.07 cM	End	127,587,601 bp
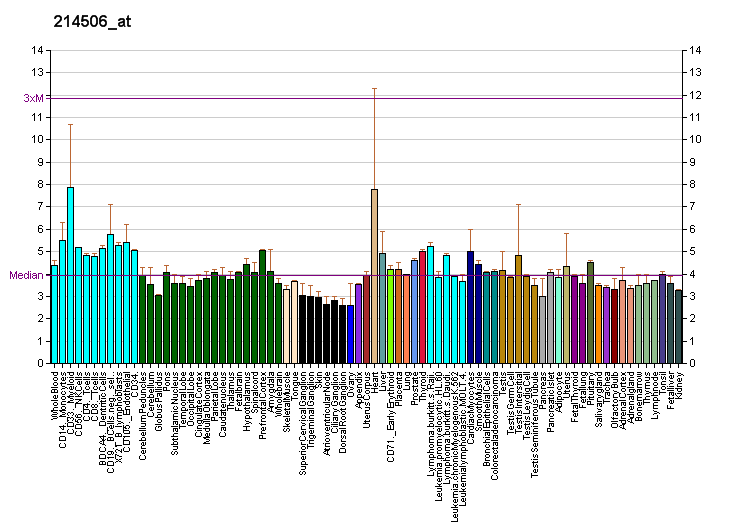
RNA expression pattern
Bgee	Human / Mouse (ortholog); Top expressed in: testicle; spleen; sperm; tendon of biceps brachii; left adrenal cortex; right adrenal cortex; tibialis anterior muscle; liver; right testis; left testis / Top expressed in: yolk sac; atrium; mesenteric lymph nodes; right lung; liver; left lobe of liver; right lung lobe; endocardial cushion; left lung lobe; embryo; More reference expression data
BioGPS	More reference expression data
Gene ontology
Molecular function	G protein-coupled receptor activity; transmembrane signaling receptor activity; signal transducer activity
Cellular component	plasma membrane; membrane; intracellular anatomical structure; integral component of membrane
Biological process	G protein-coupled receptor signaling pathway; cell surface receptor signaling pathway; intracellular signal transduction; signal transduction
Sources:Amigo / QuickGO
Orthologs
Databases	NCBI: entry; OMA: entry
Species	Human	Mouse
Entrez	11318	11536
Ensembl	ENSG00000166856	ENSMUSG00000058396
UniProt	O15218	P43142
RefSeq (mRNA)	NM_007264	NM_007412
RefSeq (protein)	NP_009195	NP_031438
Location (UCSC)	Chr 12: 56.99 – 57 Mb	Chr 10: 127.58 – 127.59 Mb
PubMed search
- Wikidata
View/Edit Human	View/Edit Mouse

Atypical chemokine receptor 5 is a protein which in humans is encoded by the gene ACKR5 (previously GPR182). It is an atypical G-protein coupled receptor. It functions to regulate chemokine levels by sequestering its ligands: CXCL13 and CCL28.

When this gene was first cloned, it was proposed to encode an adrenomedullin receptor. However, when the corresponding protein was expressed, it was found not to respond to adrenomedullin (ADM).

It was subsequently shown that a different GPCR, CALCRL when complexed with RAMP2 can function as an ADM receptor.

== See also ==
- Duffy antigen system (ACKR1)
- Atypical chemokine receptor 2
- Atypical chemokine receptor 3
- Atypical chemokine receptor 4
