= Atypical chemokine receptor 4 =

Protein found in humans

ACKR4

Identifiers
- Aliases: ACKR4, CC-CKR-11, CCBP2, CCR-11, CCR10, CCR11, CCRL1, CCX CKR, CCX-CKR, CKR-11, PPR1, VSHK1, atypical chemokine receptor 4
- External IDs: OMIM: 606065; MGI: 2181676; GeneCards: ACKR4

Gene location (Human)
Chr.	Chromosome 3 (human)
Band	3q22.1	Start	132,597,270 bp
Band	3q22.1	End	132,618,967 bp

Gene location (Mouse)
Chr.	Chromosome 9 (mouse)
Band	9|9 F1	Start	103,961,356 bp
Band	9|9 F1	End	104,004,132 bp
RNA expression pattern
Bgee	Human / Mouse (ortholog); Top expressed in: duodenum; ascending aorta; gallbladder; Descending thoracic aorta; subcutaneous adipose tissue; right coronary artery; skin of leg; Achilles tendon; skin of abdomen; pituitary gland / Top expressed in: lip; morula; choroid plexus of fourth ventricle; body of femur; umbilical cord; esophagus; calvaria; thymus; stroma of bone marrow; zone of skin; More reference expression data
BioGPS	n/a
Gene ontology
Molecular function	signal transducer activity; chemokine binding; scavenger receptor activity; G protein-coupled receptor activity; protein binding; chemokine receptor activity; C-C chemokine receptor activity; C-C chemokine binding
Cellular component	recycling endosome; plasma membrane; membrane; endosome; integral component of membrane; early endosome; integral component of plasma membrane; external side of plasma membrane
Biological process	receptor-mediated endocytosis; signal transduction; immune response; chemotaxis; G protein-coupled receptor signaling pathway; chemokine-mediated signaling pathway; positive regulation of cytosolic calcium ion concentration; calcium-mediated signaling; cell chemotaxis; vesicle-mediated transport; endocytosis
Sources:Amigo / QuickGO
Orthologs
Databases	NCBI: entry; OMA: entry
Species	Human	Mouse
Entrez	51554	252837
Ensembl	ENSG00000129048	ENSMUSG00000079355
UniProt	Q9NPB9	Q924I3
RefSeq (mRNA)	NM_178445; NM_016557	NM_145700
RefSeq (protein)	NP_057641; NP_848540	NP_663746
Location (UCSC)	Chr 3: 132.6 – 132.62 Mb	Chr 9: 103.96 – 104 Mb
PubMed search
- Wikidata
View/Edit Human	View/Edit Mouse

Atypical chemokine receptor 4 is a protein that in humans is encoded by the ACKR4 gene (previously CCRL1).

The protein encoded by this gene is a member of the G protein-coupled receptor family, and is a receptor for C-C type chemokines. This receptor has been shown to bind dendritic cell- and T cell-activated chemokines including CCL19/ELC, CCL21/SLC, and CCL25/TECK. Alternatively spliced transcript variants encoding the same protein have been described.

== See also ==
- Duffy antigen system (ACKR1)
- Atypical chemokine receptor 2
- Atypical chemokine receptor 3
- Atypical chemokine receptor 5
