= Atypical chemokine receptor 2 =

Protein found in humans

ACKR2

Identifiers
- Aliases: ACKR2, CCBP2, CCR10, CCR9, CMKBR9, D6, hD6, atypical chemokine receptor 2
- External IDs: OMIM: 602648; MGI: 1891697; GeneCards: ACKR2

Gene location (Human)
| Chr. | Chromosome 3 (human) |
| Band | 3p22.1 | Start | 42,804,752 bp |
| Band | 3p22.1 | End | 42,887,974 bp |

Gene location (Mouse)
| Chr. | Chromosome 9 (mouse) |
| Band | 9|9 F4 | Start | 121,727,421 bp |
| Band | 9|9 F4 | End | 121,740,140 bp |
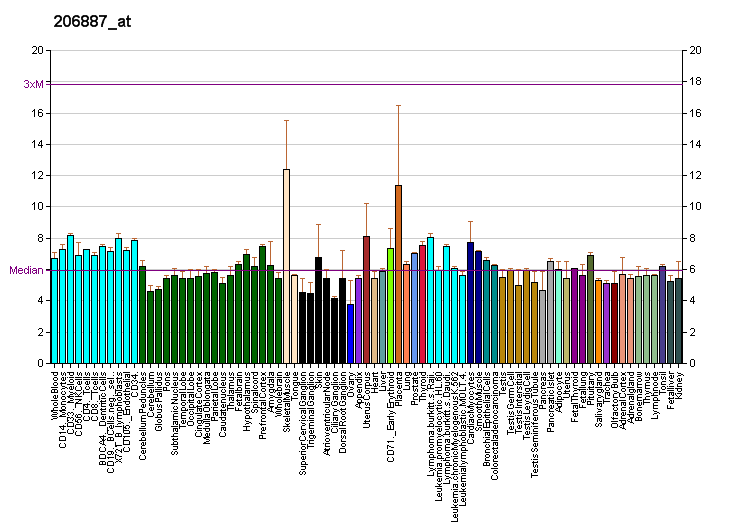
RNA expression pattern
| Bgee | Human / Mouse (ortholog); Top expressed in: placenta; right lobe of liver; testicle; gonad; tibial nerve; sural nerve; subcutaneous adipose tissue; tibialis anterior muscle; mucosa of transverse colon; left coronary artery / Top expressed in: right lung lobe; ankle; left lung lobe; embryo; skin of external ear; carotid body; decidua; gastrula; submandibular gland; mesenteric lymph nodes; More reference expression data |
| BioGPS | More reference expression data |
Gene ontology
| Molecular function | signal transducer activity; chemokine receptor activity; C-C chemokine binding; G protein-coupled receptor activity; scavenger receptor activity; C-C chemokine receptor activity; chemokine binding |
| Cellular component | integral component of membrane; early endosome; recycling endosome; membrane; actin filament; endosome; plasma membrane; integral component of plasma membrane; nucleoplasm; cytosol; nuclear membrane; intracellular membrane-bounded organelle; external side of plasma membrane |
| Biological process | signal transduction; multicellular organism development; inflammatory response; immune response; chemokine-mediated signaling pathway; G protein-coupled receptor signaling pathway; chemotaxis; receptor-mediated endocytosis; positive regulation of cytosolic calcium ion concentration; calcium-mediated signaling; cell chemotaxis; vesicle-mediated transport; endocytosis |
Sources:Amigo / QuickGO
Orthologs
| Databases | NCBI: entry; OMA: entry |
| Species | Human | Mouse |
| Entrez | 1238 | 59289 |
| Ensembl | ENSG00000144648 | ENSMUSG00000044534 |
| UniProt | O00590 | O08707 |
| RefSeq (mRNA) | NM_001296 | NM_001276719; NM_021609 |
| RefSeq (protein) | NP_001287 | NP_001263648; NP_067622 |
| Location (UCSC) | Chr 3: 42.8 – 42.89 Mb | Chr 9: 121.73 – 121.74 Mb |
| PubMed search |
- Wikidata
| View/Edit Human | View/Edit Mouse |

Atypical chemokine receptor 2 is a protein that in humans is encoded by the ACKR2 gene (previously CCBP2).

This gene encodes a beta chemokine receptor, which is predicted to be a seven transmembrane protein similar to G protein-coupled receptors. Chemokines and their receptor-mediated signal transduction are critical for the recruitment of effector immune cells to the inflammation site. This gene is expressed in a range of tissues and hemopoietic cells. The expression of this receptor in lymphatic endothelial cells and overexpression in vascular tumors suggested its function in chemokine-driven recirculation of leukocytes and possible chemokine effects on the development and growth of vascular tumors. This receptor appears to bind the majority of beta-chemokine family members; however, its specific function remains unknown. This gene is mapped to chromosome 3p21.3, a region that includes a cluster of chemokine receptor genes.

== See also ==
- Duffy antigen system (ACKR1)
- Atypical chemokine receptor 3
- Atypical chemokine receptor 4
- Atypical chemokine receptor 5
