= Tabernaemontana bufalina =

Conservation status
- Least Concern (IUCN 3.1)

Scientific classification
- Kingdom: Plantae
- Clade: Tracheophytes
- Clade: Angiosperms
- Clade: Eudicots
- Clade: Asterids
- Order: Gentianales
- Family: Apocynaceae
- Genus: Tabernaemontana
- Species: T. bufalina

Binomial name
- Tabernaemontana bufalina Lour.

Synonyms
- Ervatamia annamensis (Eberh. & Dubard); Ervatamia bufalina (Lour.) Pichon; Ervatamia celastroides Kerr; Ervatamia ceratocarpa Kerr; Ervatamia chengkiangensis Tsiang; Ervatamia hainanensis Tsiang; Ervatamia hoabinhensis Lý; Ervatamia laxiflora Pichon; Ervatamia longipedicellata Lý; Ervatamia luensis (Pierre ex Pit.) Pierre ex Kerr; Ervatamia microphylla (Pit.) Kerr; Ervatamia subcapitata (Wall.) Lace; Tabernaemontana annamensis Eberh. & Dubard; Tabernaemontana celastroides (Kerr) P.T.Li; Tabernaemontana ceratocarpa (Kerr) P.T.Li; Tabernaemontana chengkiangensis (Tsiang) P.T.Li; Tabernaemontana hainanensis (Tsiang) P.T.Li; Tabernaemontana jasminiflora Pit.; Tabernaemontana jasminoides Tsiang; Tabernaemontana luensis Pierre ex Pit.; Tabernaemontana microphylla Pit.; Tabernaemontana pallida Pierre ex Pit.; Tabernaemontana subcapitata Wall.

Species of plant

Tabernaemontana bufalina is a species of flowering plant in the family Apocynaceae. It is native to Cambodia, China, Laos, Myanmar, Thailand, Vietnam.
