= Conolidine =

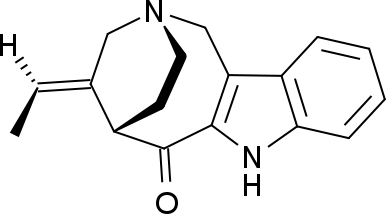

Names
- Systematic IUPAC name (4E,5S)-4-Ethylidene-1,4,5,7-tetrahydro-2,5-ethanoazocino[4,3-b]indol-6(3H)-one

Identifiers
| CAS Number | 100414-81-1 |
| 3D model (JSmol) | Interactive image |
| ChemSpider | 26000837 |
| PubChem CID | 51051652 |
| UNII | WJ97DL8YCB |
| CompTox Dashboard (EPA) | DTXSID401126453 |
- InChI: InChI=1S/C17H18N2O/c1-2-11-9-19-8-7-12(11)17(20)16-14(10-19)13-5-3-4-6-15(13)18-16/h2-6,12,18H,7-10H2,1H3/b11-2-/t12-/m0/s1 Key: DBGBUYFOJXOYNY-RENATIMJSA-N; InChI=1/C17H18N2O/c1-2-11-9-19-8-7-12(11)17(20)16-14(10-19)13-5-3-4-6-15(13)18-16/h2-6,12,18H,7-10H2,1H3/b11-2-/t12-/m0/s1 Key: DBGBUYFOJXOYNY-RENATIMJBD
- SMILES: O=C(C(N1)=C(CN2C/3)C4=C1C=CC=C4)[C@](CC2)([H])C3=C/C

Properties
| Chemical formula | C_{17}H_{18}N_{2}O |
| Molar mass | 266.344 g·mol^{−1} |
- Except where otherwise noted, data are given for materials in their standard state (at 25 °C [77 °F], 100 kPa). verify (what is ?) Infobox references

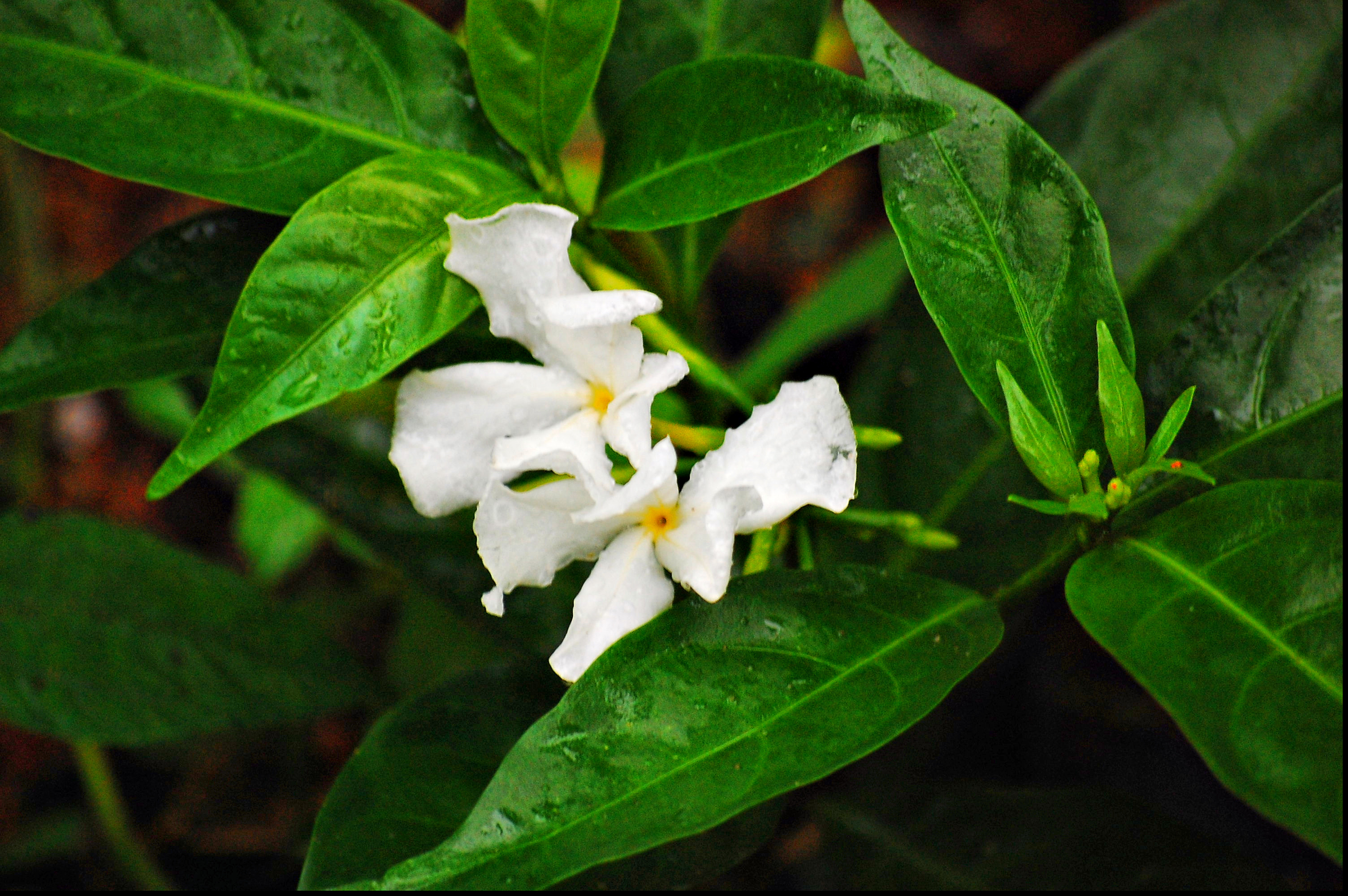
Tabernaemontana divaricata

Conolidine is an indole alkaloid. Preliminary reports suggest that it could provide analgesic effects with fewer of the side effects associated with conventional opioids.

Conolidine was first isolated in 2004 from the bark of the Tabernaemontana divaricata (crape jasmine) shrub which is used in traditional Chinese medicine.

The first asymmetric total synthesis of conolidine was developed by Micalizio and coworkers in 2011. This synthetic route allows access to either enantiomer (mirror image) of conolidine via an early enzymatic resolution. Notably, evaluation of the synthetic material resulted in the discovery that both enantiomers of the synthetic compound show analgesic effects.

Unlike conventional opioid analgesics, conolidine acts as a full agonist at atypical chemokine receptor 3 (ACKR3). It is proposed that this mechanism inhibits the scavenging functions of ACKR3, leading to an increase in available endogenous opioids.

== Pharmacology ==
Conolidine has been shown to act as a full agonist at the atypical chemokine receptor ACKR3 (CXCR7). By activating and internalizing this receptor, conolidine prevents endogenous opioid peptides, such as endorphins and enkephalins, from being scavenged. This leads to an increased availability of those peptides at classical opioid receptors.

In 2011, the Bohn lab noted antinociception against both chemically induced and inflammation-derived pain, and experiments indicated lack of opioid receptor modulation, but were unable to define a particular target. A 2019 study by a cross-site Australian and U.S. group discovered through cultured neuronal networks that conolidine may inhibit the Ca v2.2 channel, a mechanism seen in molecules like conotoxin. The group was unable to rule out partial polypharmacology against other targets.

== Chemistry ==
=== Synthesis ===
The Micalizio route (2011) achieved the end product in 9 steps from a commercially available acetyl-pyridine. Notable reactions include a [2,3]-Still-Wittig rearrangement and a conformationally-controlled intramolecular Mannich cyclization.

The Weinreb group (2014) used a conjugative addition of an indole precursor to an oxime-substituted nitrosoalkene to generate the tetracyclic skeleton of conolidine in 4 steps.

Takayama and colleagues (2016) synthesized conolidine and apparicine through a gold(I)-catalyzed exo-dig synthesis of a racemic piperidinyl aldehyde.

Ohno and Fujii (2016) accessed the tricyclic pre-Mannich intermediate through a chiral gold(I) catalyzed cascade cyclization.

In 2019, a six step synthesis was developed using Gold-catalyzed cyclization reaction and Pictet-Spengler reaction having 19% overall yield.

=== Derivatives ===
DS54360155, a novel compound with a unique and original bicyclic skeleton, is more a potent analgesic than conolidine in mice. DS39201083 and DS34942424 are other similar derivatives. They all lack mu-opioid activity. The researchers who found conolidine binding site ACKR3/CKCR7 also developed a synthetic analogue of it called RTI-5152-12. It displays an even greater activity on that receptor.

== See also ==
- Lochnericine
- Pericine
- Stemmadenine
- Conofoline
- LIH383
