= Scavenger receptor (endocrinology) =

Inactive membrane receptor

Scavenger receptors in endocrinology are inactive membrane receptors which bind certain hormones such as IGF-1 and do not transmit an intracellular response.
