= C11H16N2 =

The molecular formula C_{11}H_{16}N_{2} (molar mass: 176.263 g/mol) may refer to:

- Benzylpiperazine (BZP)
- Methylphenylpiperazines
  - ortho-Methylphenylpiperazine (oMPP)
  - para-Methylphenylpiperazine
- 6-Methylnicotine
