= 5-Iodo-A-85380 =

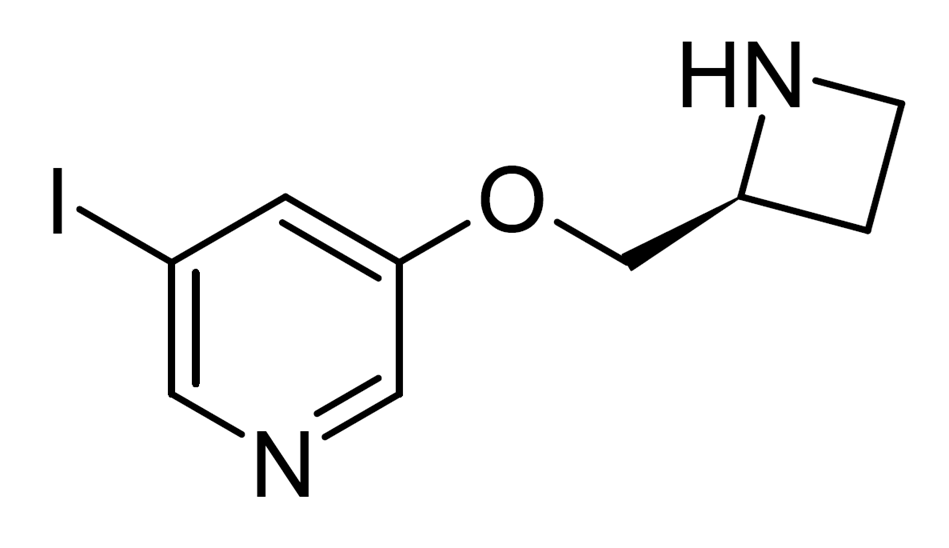

Identifiers
- IUPAC name: 3-[(2S)-2-azetidinylmethoxy]-5-iodopyridine
- CAS Number: 213550-82-4
- PubChem CID: 6604876
- ChemSpider: 5037135
- UNII: POX639L40H
- ChEBI: CHEBI:104132
- ChEMBL: ChEMBL123433
- CompTox Dashboard (EPA): DTXSID40175620

Chemical and physical data
- Formula: C_{9}H_{11}IN_{2}O
- Molar mass: 290.104 g·mol^{−1}
- 3D model (JSmol): Interactive image
- SMILES: C1CN[C@@H]1COC2=CC(=CN=C2)I
- InChI: InChI=1S/C9H11IN2O/c10-7-3-9(5-11-4-7)13-6-8-1-2-12-8/h3-5,8,12H,1-2,6H2/t8-/m0/s1; Key:RKVRGRXOYDTUEY-QMMMGPOBSA-N

5-Iodo-A-85380 (5IA) is a drug which acts as an agonist at neural nicotinic acetylcholine receptors with high affinity and full agonist activity at the α_{4}β_{2} subtype, and with slightly lower affinity and partial agonist activity at the α_{6}β_{2} subtype. It has analgesic effects, and triggers release of dopamine in the brain, with weaker release of acetylcholine and noradrenaline. Like nicotine, but unlike related compounds such as epibatidine, 5-iodo-A-85380 has reinforcing effects and supports self-administration in animal models. It is used for research into nicotine addiction, and also in its ^{123}I radiolabelled form for brain imaging studies.

== See also ==
- 6-Chloronicotine
- 6-Methylnicotine
- A-85380
- Nifene
- Pozanicline
- Tebanicline
- Sazetidine A
