= 6-Chloronicotine =

Chemical compound

Identifiers
- IUPAC name: 2-chloro-5-[(2S)-1-methylpyrrolidin-2-yl]pyridine
- CAS Number: 112091-17-5
- PubChem CID: 10631771
- ChemSpider: 8807133
- UNII: YT5WAL3YF3
- CompTox Dashboard (EPA): DTXSID90442718

Chemical and physical data
- Formula: C_{10}H_{13}ClN_{2}
- Molar mass: 196.68 g·mol^{−1}
- 3D model (JSmol): Interactive image
- SMILES: CN1CCC[C@H]1C2=CN=C(C=C2)Cl
- InChI: InChI=1S/C10H13ClN2/c1-13-6-2-3-9(13)8-4-5-10(11)12-7-8/h4-5,7,9H,2-3,6H2,1H3/t9-/m0/s1; Key:SVVOLGNZRGLPIU-VIFPVBQESA-N

6-Chloronicotine is a drug which acts as an agonist at nicotinic acetylcholine receptors. It substitutes for nicotine in animal studies with around twice the potency, and shows antinociceptive effects.

== Pharmacology ==
The antinociceptive effects of 6-chloronicotine are reported to be some 15.4 times the relative potency of nicotine in the tail flick test. 6-Bromonicotine was 14.4 times nicotine in this same test.

== Application ==
6-Chloronicotine is used in the synthesis of macrostomine (c.f. Arenina).

Another application is in the synthesis of brevicolline, a naturally occurring harmala alkaloid present in Carex brevicollis.

== See also ==
- 5-Iodo-A-85380
- 6-Methylnicotine
- ABT-418
- Altinicline
- Epibatidine
- Tebanicline
