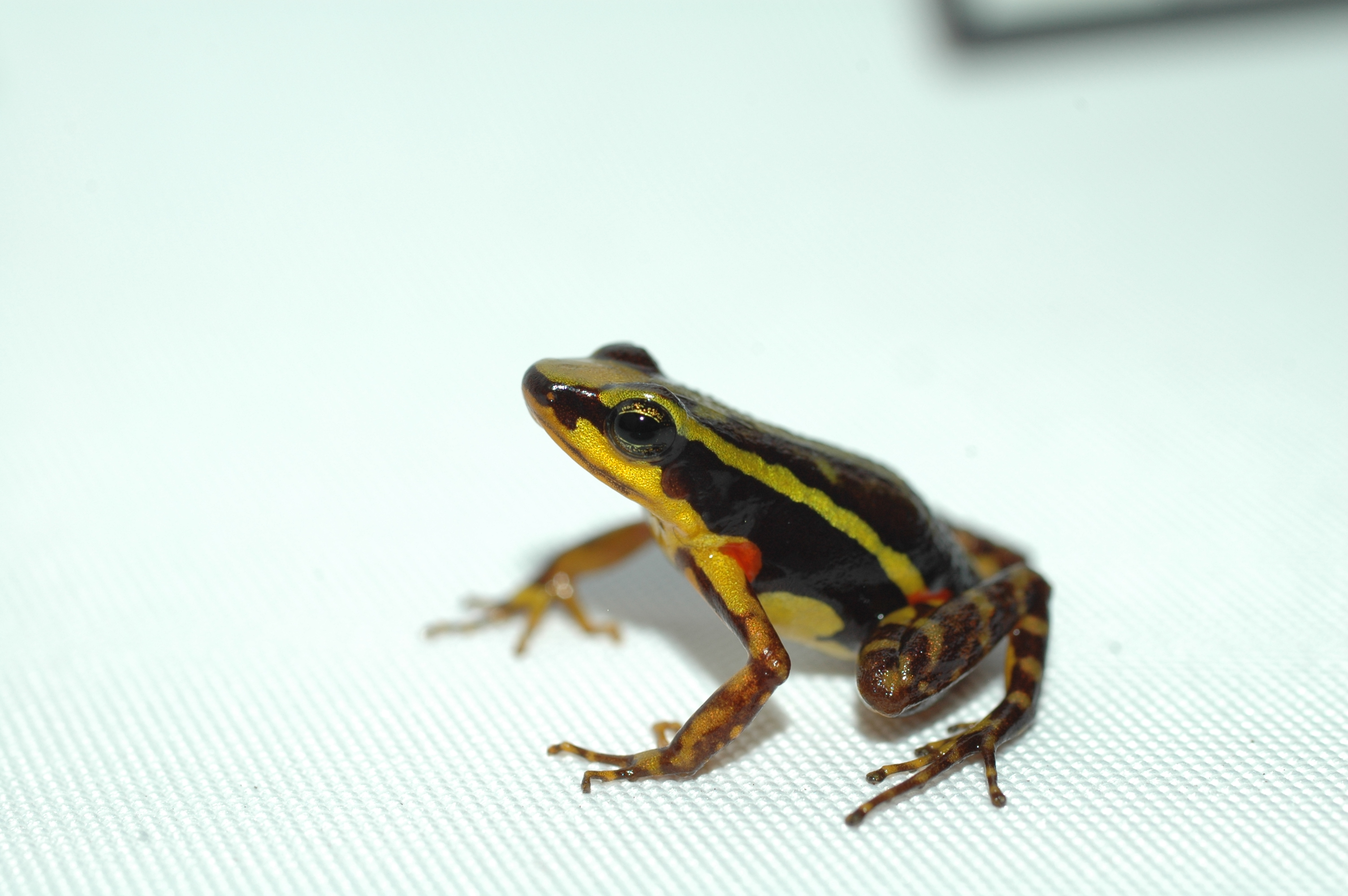

Conservation status
- Vulnerable (IUCN 3.1)

Scientific classification
- Kingdom: Animalia
- Phylum: Chordata
- Class: Amphibia
- Order: Anura
- Family: Dendrobatidae
- Genus: Epipedobates
- Species: E. tricolor

Binomial name
- Epipedobates tricolor (Boulenger, 1899)

Synonyms
- Prostherapis tricolor Boulenger, 1899; Phyllobates tricolor (Boulenger, 1899); Dendrobates tricolor (Boulenger, 1899); Ameerega tricolor (Boulenger, 1899); Colostethus paradoxus Rivero, 1991

= Phantasmal poison frog =

Species of amphibian

The phantasmal poison frog or phantasmal poison-arrow frog (Epipedobates tricolor) is a species of poison dart frog first described in 1899 by Boulenger. It is endemic to Ecuador, specifically the Andean slopes of central Ecuador in Bolívar Province. They are known for their radiant warm colors and distinct lightly colored stripes and blotches that run along the length of their body. They are one of the most poisonous animals on the planet, with a poison hundreds of times stronger than morphine. This species has been classified as vulnerable due to an increase in habitat destruction in the few locations where they are known to live.

== Description ==
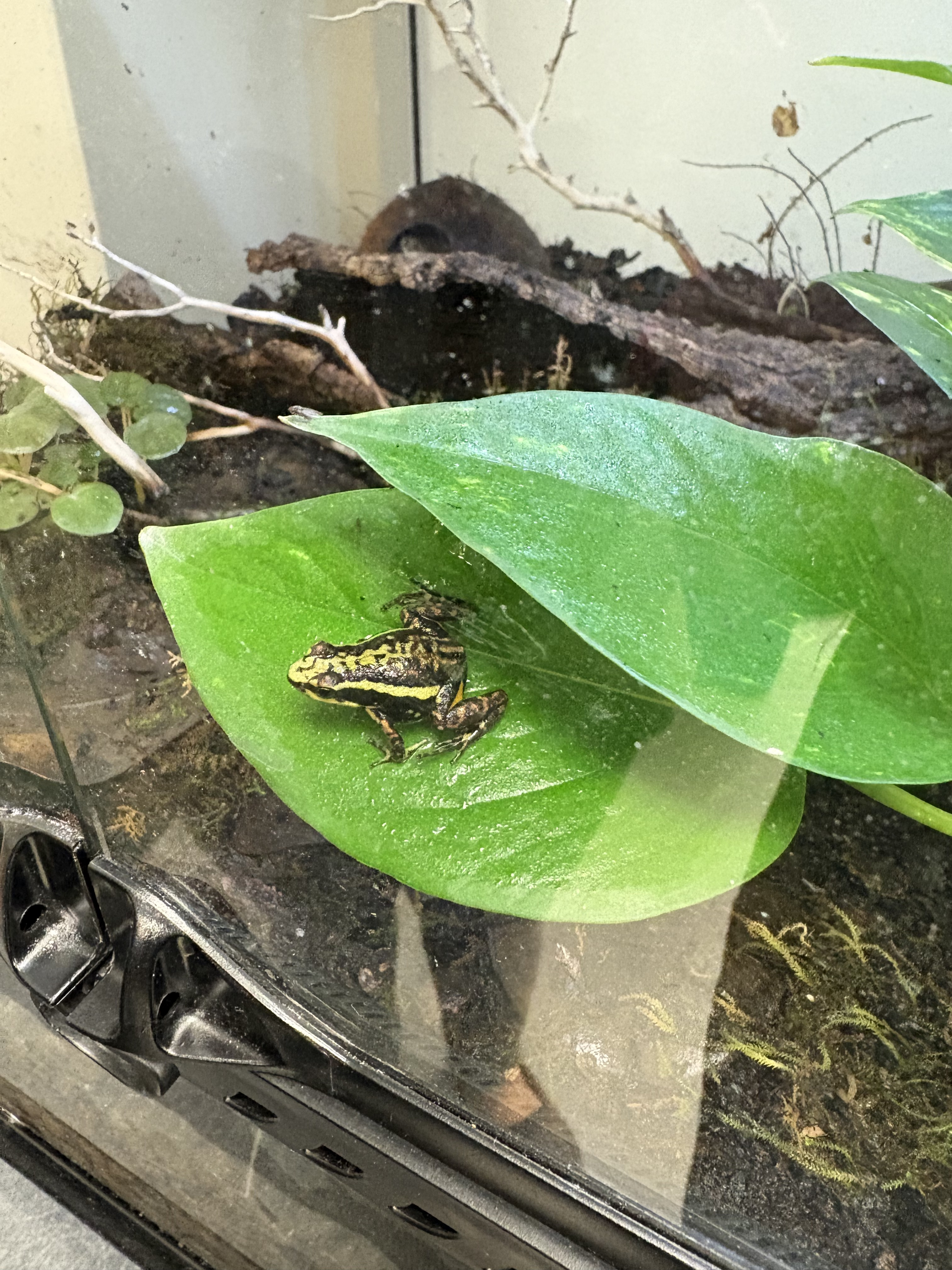
A captive Epipedobates tricolor

The Phantasmal Dart Frog varies in body color, ranging from dark brown to dark red or black. They have two or three bright orange, bright yellow, or even light green longitudinal stripes along their back, ranging from their head to their rear. These can be straight or in a flame-like shape. Their extremities, along with parts of their dorsal surface, have blotches or spots that match the color of their stripes. They also have distinct red or orange spots or markings in their hind areas. They have a snout-to-vent length of about 22.6 mm (0.9 in), placing them on the smaller end of poison dart frogs. They have a wide head, truncated snout, and smooth skin. All of their fingers are partially webbed, and their first finger is longer than their second. The dorsal surface is usually green or yellow and there are longitudinal stripes.

== Distribution and habitat ==
The phantasmal poison frog is known only from a number of locations in central Ecuador on the Andean slopes of Bolívar Province, at heights of between 319 and 1,769 m (1,047 and 5,804 ft) above sea level. The species inhabits the Chocoan tropical and subtropical rain forest in Ecuador. Its natural habitat is in the leaf litter on the floor of the tropical forest, especially near streams, and in inland wetlands. They are also found in banana and cacao plantations, and pastures near streams. Its habitat is very similar to other species of the poison dart frog family such as the dyeing dart frog (Dendrobates tinctorius) and the green-and-black dart frog (Dendrobates auratus).

== Biology ==
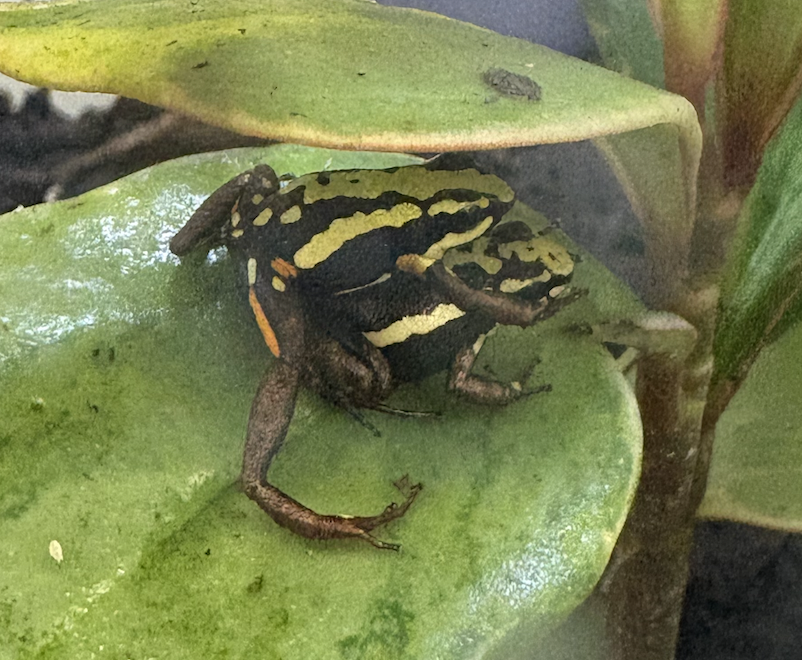
Mating phantasmal poison frogs in amplexus.

Reproductive behavior and parental care: The eggs are laid in leaf litter, and the clutch sizes are around 10 eggs. The males stand guard for the eggs and later in their development carry the tadpoles on their back to bodies of water, which provides a safe haven for the tadpoles to develop.

Behavior: The Phantasmal Dart Frog is diurnal. Males are vocal and make a majority of calls in the mornings, but they are also known to make calls at night. They mostly make these calls on an elevated perch but can make them on the ground as well. Males are also known to compete for "the best" perch in a hierarchal power system. The males are also very territorial and are aggressive upon their territory being breached. They will first use vocalization to defend their territory, sending out calls at the intruders. If that doesn't work, they will chase and fight the intruders to defend their territory. Unlike the males, females are not known to be territorial.

Poison: Being a part of the dart-frog family, their vibrant colors alert predators that they are highly toxic. This aposematic coloration is selected for in natural selection because of the protection it offers. The frogs secrete epibatidine, a toxin of high pharmacological interest, from glands in their skin as a defense mechanism against predators. It has been studied to be hundreds of times stronger than morphine. While many of the poisons from the Epipedobates clade of poison frogs is exogenous, as they metabolize certain alkaloids found in their prey, research has not concluded if this applies to E. Tricolor.

Close relatives: Phantasmal poison frogs live in similar areas to Epipedobates machalilla, despite the fact that the two to occupy slightly different environmental niches. Both of their population distributions are small, causing overlap with that of E. machalilla. Genetic analysis places phantasmal poison frog clades within E. machalilla clades and suggests that the phantasmal poison frog diverged recently via either peripheral speciation or high phenotypic divergence Despite living in a separate location and being proven to be genetically distinct, the phantasmal poison frog has often been confused with Epipedobates anthonyi – the two weren't formally distinguished as two different species until a 2004 study concluded so. They're often confused due to their similar coloring patterns and vocal calls. However, they do have many differences. E. anythonyi's first finger is longer than their second, while E. Tricolor's is not known to have this difference in finger length. E. anthonyi are also distinguished visually by their brick red to bright red coloring divided by cream or light-yellow longitudinal stripes that run from the head to the hips.

== Diet ==
The phantasmal poison frog's diet is based on the consumption of insects. In their habitat in the Andes mountains, their diet consists of insects includes ants, termites, and beetles.

== Status ==
The phantasmal poison frog is listed as "vulnerable" by the IUCN. This is because of its limited range, estimated to be less than 5,000 square kilometres (1,900 sq mi) and the apparent decline in numbers of this species. Epibatidine is a toxin of pharmacological interest due to its medicinal value as a painkiller and opioid blocker. It has been studied to be over two-hundred times as powerful as morphine. The IUCN has noted that over-harvesting of the frog for medicinal research could pose a risk for the species.
