= C9H12N2O =

The molecular formula C_{9}H_{12}N_{2}O (molar mass: 164.208 g/mol) may refer to:

- A-85380
- Kynuramine
