= John W. Daly =

American biochemist

- Born: June 8, 1933; Portland, Oregon
- Died: March 5, 2008 (aged 74); Rockville, Maryland
- Education: Oregon State University (B.S., M.S.); Stanford University (Ph.D.)
- Known for: Discovery of amphibian alkaloids
- Awards: Ernest Guenther Award (2002); election, U.S. National Academy of Sciences (1997)
- Scientific career
- Fields: Pharmacology, Pharmacognosy, Natural Products Chemistry
- Institutions: National Institutes of Health

John William Daly (June 8, 1933 – March 5, 2008) was an award-winning American natural products chemist, pharmacologist, and biochemist, and a leading authority on amphibian alkaloids and other areas of natural products chemistry. He conducted essentially all of his seminal research as a staff member at the National Institutes of Health in Bethesda, Maryland, over a period of fifty years. His awards include the Ernest Guenther Award for Achievements in the Chemistry of Natural Products from the American Chemical Society in 2002, the Norman R. Farnsworth Research Achievement Award of the American Society of Pharmacognosy in 1997, Presidential Rank Meritorious Award in 1998, and election to the U.S. National Academy of Sciences, also in 1997.

== Early life and education ==
Daly earned bachelor of science and master of arts degrees from Oregon State College (now Oregon State University), in biochemistry (1954) and organic chemistry (1955), respectively. He then went on to do his doctoral work at Stanford University, receiving his Ph.D., also in organic chemistry, in 1958.

== Research career ==
Daly performed research for nearly 50 years at the National Institutes of Health in Bethesda, Maryland. Primary foci of his research included the discovery, structure elucidation, synthesis, and pharmacology of alkaloids and other biologically active natural products. He was the world's leading authority in amphibian alkaloids and an expert in many areas of natural products.

Daly was a prolific writer, producing around 700 papers, including books and chapters. He was also a member of the Editorial Board of the scientific journal Cellular and Molecular Neurobiology, since its inception in 1980.

== Awards and recognition ==
Daly's receiving the Ernest Guenther Award for Achievements in the Chemistry of Natural Products from the American Chemical Society in 2002 was among the last of a long series of recognitions for the scientist before his death, and it bracketed his receipt of the Hillebrand Award of that Society's Washington, D.C. Section in 1978. Other ways in which he was recignized included the Karl Wilhelm Scheele Award of the Swedish Academy of Pharmaceutical Sciences in 1999, the Norman R. Farnsworth Research Achievement Award of the American Society of Pharmacognosy in 1997, and his recognition by his employer, the United States Government, with the 1998 Presidential Rank Meritorious Award. He became a Scientist Emeritus at the NIH in 2003.

Daly was elected to the U.S. National Academy of Sciences in 1997, his stated sections being, first, "physiology and pharmacology", and second, "chemistry". This coincided with his election as a Corresponding Member of the Argentine Academia Nacional de Ciencias Exactas, Físicas y Naturales in that same year, and it followed his election as a Fellow of the American Association for the Advancement of Science in 1991.

== Personal life ==
Daly died on March 5, 2008 due to pancreatic cancer.

== See also ==
- Epibatidine
- Phantasmidine
