= C11H16N2O =

The molecular formula C_{11}H_{16}N_{2}O (molar mass: 192.26 g/mol, exact mass: 192.1263 u) may refer to:

- A-84,543
- para-Methoxyphenylpiperazine (MeOPP)
- Pozanicline
- Tocainide
