= Epipedobates narinensis =

Conservation status
- Data Deficient (IUCN 3.1)

Scientific classification
- Kingdom: Animalia
- Phylum: Chordata
- Class: Amphibia
- Order: Anura
- Family: Dendrobatidae
- Genus: Epipedobates
- Species: E. narinensis

Binomial name
- Epipedobates narinensis Mueses-Cisneros JJ, Cepeda-Quilindo B, and Moreno-Quintero V, 2008

Genus of amphibians

Epipedobates narinensis is a species of poison dart frog (family Dendrobatidae). It was first described as a distinct species in 2008.

== Taxonomy ==
After a major reclassification of poison dart frogs in 2006, Epipedobates had only 5 species remaining in the genus. E. narinensis is one of two species since discovered and described in Epipedobates, the other being Epipedobates darwinwallacei.

== Description ==
No females were identified in the initial description. Males have a snout-vent length of 15-17mm, with a dark green dorsum and black flanks. A light green to blue-green ventrolateral line extends from the lip to the groin. The abdomen is yellow to yellow-green, mottled and reticulated. E. narinensis is similar to E. boulengeri and E. espinosai. E. narinensis is distinguishable by its forefinger being much longer than its second finger, compared to the forefinger being only slightly longer than the second finger in other species.

== Young ==
After the eggs hatch, the adult frog carries the tadpoles to water, though scientists do not know which type of body of water the species preferes. People have observed male frogs carrying two or three tadpoles at the same time.

At stage 25, the tadpole measures 3.2 mm in body length and 8.2 mm in total length. It has a rounded snout in the lateral view. Its mouth is underneath its body.

== Habitat ==
Little is known about the distribution of E. narinensis. It was first described in Nariño, Colombia. The frog's range includes at least one protected park: Reserva Natural Biotopo Selva Húmeda.

This diurnal frog has been observed in the leaf litter in rainforests between 540 and 600 meters above sea level.

== Threats ==
The IUCN classifies this frog as data deficient. Its suffers from illicit coca farming and the resultant fumigation, which has been condemned by the government. Oil spills also pose a threat to this frog.
