= C10H15N3 =

The molecular formula C_{10}H_{15}N_{3} (molar mass: 177.25 g/mol, exact mass: 177.1266 u) may refer to:

- Bethanidine (or betanidine)
- TC-1827
