= C11H12N4 =

The molecular formula C_{11}H_{12}N_{4} may refer to:

- A-366,833
- KNX-100
