= Methylphenylpiperazine =

Methylphenylpiperazine may refer to:

- ortho-Methylphenylpiperazine (oMPP)
- para-Methylphenylpiperazine
