= Sazetidine A =

Pharmaceutical drug

Identifiers
- IUPAC name: 6-[5-[(2S)-2-Azetidinylmethoxy]-3-pyridinyl]-5-hexyn-1-ol
- CAS Number: 820231-95-6
- PubChem CID: 11983356
- ChemSpider: 10155861
- UNII: LH23S35NSM
- CompTox Dashboard (EPA): DTXSID401010179

Chemical and physical data
- Formula: C_{15}H_{20}N_{2}O_{2}
- Molar mass: 260.337 g·mol^{−1}
- 3D model (JSmol): Interactive image
- SMILES: OCCCCC#Cc1cc(cnc1)OCC2CCN2
- InChI: InChI=1S/C15H20N2O2/c18-8-4-2-1-3-5-13-9-15(11-16-10-13)19-12-14-6-7-17-14/h9-11,14,17-18H,1-2,4,6-8,12H2/t14-/m0/s1; Key:WONBUILDJNKYCB-AWEZNQCLSA-N

Sazetidine A (AMOP-H-OH & Saz-A) is a drug which acts as a subtype selective partial agonist at α4β2 neural nicotinic acetylcholine receptors, acting as an agonist at (α4)2(β2)3 pentamers, but as an antagonist at (α4)3(β2)2 pentamers. It has potent analgesic effects in animal studies comparable to those of epibatidine, but with less toxicity, and also has antidepressant action.

Saz-A is based on an 20th century agent called A-85380 that had Ki value of ca. 50 pM for the α4β2 nAChR.

Saz-A was able to attenuate nicotine self-administration in rats & holds promise for a new therapy to aid smoking cessation.

The potential metabolic liability of the acetylenic bond, which may be oxidized to generate a labile, highly reactive oxirene, thereby possibly giving rise to toxicity, discouraged further advancement of Saz-A down the drug discovery pipeline. The cited reference directs to a NNRTI called DPC-963. This has a structure that most strongly resembles efavirenz. It is noteworthy making the observation that the Sonogashira coupling has been used in the synthesis of a range of pharmaceuticals. In any event the alkyne moiety was replaced by a cycopropane along with diminution of the sidechain to 2 carbon atoms to yield a compound called 12a.

Additional attempts at modifying the alkyne moiety into an isoxazole heterocycle resulted in LF-3-88 & LF-3-80.

Finally, replacement of the omega-butanol sidechain in Saz-A with a phenyl gave a compound called VMY-2-95 [1434047-61-6].

YL-2-203 is another codename that was disclosed as part of the drug discovery effort. However, YL-2-203 did not cause robust decreases in drug and alcohol self-administration in the same way as Saz-A or VMY-2-95 did.
