= Dianicline =

Chemical compound

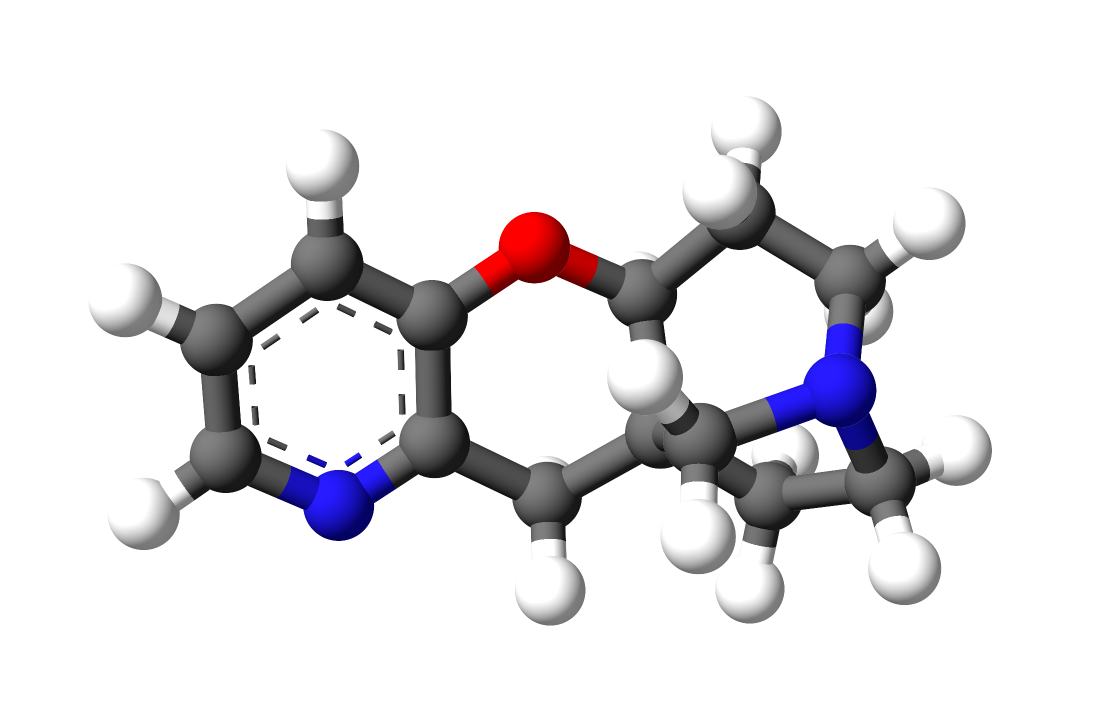

Clinical data
- ATC code: none

Identifiers
- IUPAC name: (5aS,8S,10aR)-5a,6,9,10-Tetrahydro,7H,11H-8,10a-methanopyrido[2',3':5,6]pyrano[2,3-d]azepine
- CAS Number: 292634-27-6
- PubChem CID: 9816447
- ChemSpider: 8352269
- UNII: Y0SNM34C6O
- ChEMBL: ChEMBL187927
- CompTox Dashboard (EPA): DTXSID30870314

Chemical and physical data
- Formula: C_{13}H_{16}N_{2}O
- Molar mass: 216.284 g·mol^{−1}
- 3D model (JSmol): Interactive image
- SMILES: C1CN2CC[C@@]3(C2)[C@H]1OC4=C(C3)N=CC=C4
- InChI: InChI=1S/C13H16N2O/c1-2-11-10(14-5-1)8-13-4-7-15(9-13)6-3-12(13)16-11/h1-2,5,12H,3-4,6-9H2/t12-,13+/m0/s1; Key:SUPRUPHAEXPGPF-QWHCGFSZSA-N

Dianicline (SSR-591,813) is a drug developed by Sanofi-Aventis which acts as a partial agonist at neural nicotinic acetylcholine receptors. It is subtype-selective, binding primarily to the α4β2 subtype. It is being developed as a medication for the treatment of nicotine dependence to assist in smoking cessation. Dianicline is very similar to the already marketed drug varenicline and it is unclear what advantages it will have over the older drug, although it may have an improved side effect profile. It has been through human trials up to Phase II, although results have not yet been reported. Drug development has been discontinued after reporting of unfavourable results during Phase III trials.
