= Ortho-Bromophenylpiperazine =

ortho-Bromophenylpiperazine

Clinical data
- Other names: oBPP; 2-Bromophenylpiperazine; 2-BPP; 2-Bromo-PP
- Drug class: Serotonin–norepinephrine–dopamine releasing agent

Identifiers
- IUPAC name: 1-(2-bromophenyl)piperazine
- CAS Number: 1011-13-8
- PubChem CID: 2757153
- ChemSpider: 2037913
- CompTox Dashboard (EPA): DTXSID60373747
- ECHA InfoCard: 100.199.072

Chemical and physical data
- Formula: C_{10}H_{13}BrN_{2}
- Molar mass: 241.132 g·mol^{−1}
- 3D model (JSmol): Interactive image
- SMILES: C1CN(CCN1)C2=CC=CC=C2Br
- InChI: InChI=1S/C10H13BrN2/c11-9-3-1-2-4-10(9)13-7-5-12-6-8-13/h1-4,12H,5-8H2; Key:JVTRURBMYILQDA-UHFFFAOYSA-N

ortho-Bromophenylpiperazine (oBPP), also known as 2-bromophenylpiperazine (2-BPP), is a monoamine releasing agent of the phenylpiperazine family. It acts as a serotonin–norepinephrine–dopamine releasing agent (SNDRA), with EC_{50} values of 132 nM for serotonin, 33 nM for norepinephrine, and 250 nM for dopamine in rat brain synaptosomes. The drug was first described in the scientific literature by 2012.

== See also ==
- ortho-Methylphenylpiperazine (oMPP)
- 2,3-Dichlorophenylpiperazine (2,3-DCPP)
- Benzylpiperazine (BZP)
