= 3-Bromocytisine =

Chemical compound

Identifiers
- IUPAC name: (1R,5S)-9-Bromo-1,2,3,4,5,6-hexahydro-1,5-methano-8H-pyrido[1,2-a][1,5]diazocin-8-one
- CAS Number: 207390-14-5
- PubChem CID: 15519735
- ChemSpider: 21376088
- UNII: PL64C996QA

Chemical and physical data
- Formula: C_{11}H_{13}BrN_{2}O
- Molar mass: 269.142 g·mol^{−1}
- 3D model (JSmol): Interactive image
- SMILES: c1cc2n(c(=O)c1Br)C[C@H]3C[C@@H]2CNC3
- InChI: InChI=1S/C11H13BrN2O/c12-9-1-2-10-8-3-7(4-13-5-8)6-14(10)11(9)15/h1-2,7-8,13H,3-6H2/t7-,8+/m0/s1; Key:DWDCLEHDNICBMI-JGVFFNPUSA-N

3-Bromocytisine is a derivative of the toxic alkaloid cytisine that acts as a highly potent agonist at neural nicotinic acetylcholine receptors, binding primarily to the α_{4}β_{2} and α_{7} subtypes. 3-Bromocytisine is a full agonist at the α_{7} subtype while it is only a partial agonist at α_{4}β_{2}, but has an extremely strong binding affinity at α_{4}β_{2} with 200-fold selectivity for α_{4}β_{2} over α_{7}. In animal studies 3-bromocytisine stimulates the release of dopamine and noradrenaline and increases locomotor activity.
