= Epiboxidine =

Chemical compound

Legal status
- Legal status: Investigational

Identifiers
- IUPAC name: (1R,4S,6S)-6-(3-Methylisoxazol-5-yl)-7-azabicyclo[2.2.1]heptane
- CAS Number: 188895-96-7
- PubChem CID: 5747670
- ChemSpider: 4677635
- UNII: XI646L2ARJ
- CompTox Dashboard (EPA): DTXSID20172258

Chemical and physical data
- Formula: C_{10}H_{14}N_{2}O
- Molar mass: 178.235 g·mol^{−1}
- 3D model (JSmol): Interactive image
- SMILES: CC1=NOC(=C1)[C@H]2C[C@@H]3CC[C@H]2N3
- InChI: InChI=1S/C10H14N2O/c1-6-4-10(13-12-6)8-5-7-2-3-9(8)11-7/h4,7-9,11H,2-3,5H2,1H3/t7-,8-,9+/m0/s1; Key:GEEFPQBPVBFCSD-XHNCKOQMSA-N

Epiboxidine is a chemical compound which acts as a partial agonist at neural nicotinic acetylcholine receptors, binding to both the α3β4 and the α4β2 subtypes. It was developed as a less toxic analogue of the potent frog-derived alkaloid epibatidine, which is around 200 times stronger than morphine as an analgesic but is deadly toxic.

Epiboxidine is around one-tenth as potent as epibatidine as an α4β2 agonist, but has around the same potency as an α3β4 agonist. It has only one-tenth of the analgesic power of epibatidine, but is also much less toxic.

== Uses ==
Despite reduced toxicity compared to epibatidine, epiboxidine itself is still too toxic to be developed as a drug for use in humans. It is used in scientific research and as a parent compound to derive newer analogues which may be safer and have greater potential for clinical development.

== See also ==
- ABT-418
