= Tebanicline =

Chemical compound

Clinical data
- Other names: Ebanicline, ABT-594
- ATC code: none

Identifiers
- IUPAC name: 5-{[(2R)-Azetidin-2-yl]methoxy}-2-chloropyridine
- CAS Number: 198283-73-7
- PubChem CID: 3075702
- IUPHAR/BPS: 3989
- ChemSpider: 2334347
- UNII: 9KX8NKV538
- ChEBI: CHEBI:234304
- ChEMBL: ChEMBL430497
- CompTox Dashboard (EPA): DTXSID90173555
- ECHA InfoCard: 100.207.679

Chemical and physical data
- Formula: C_{9}H_{11}ClN_{2}O
- Molar mass: 198.65 g·mol^{−1}
- 3D model (JSmol): Interactive image
- SMILES: C1CN[C@H]1COC2=CN=C(C=C2)Cl
- InChI: InChI=1S/C9H11ClN2O/c10-9-2-1-8(5-12-9)13-6-7-3-4-11-7/h1-2,5,7,11H,3-4,6H2/t7-/m1/s1; Key:MKTAGSRKQIGEBH-SSDOTTSWSA-N

Tebanicline (ebanicline, ABT-594) is a potent synthetic nicotinic (non-opioid) analgesic drug developed by Abbott. It was developed as a less toxic analog of the potent poison dart frog-derived compound epibatidine, which is about 200 times stronger than morphine as an analgesic, but produces extremely dangerous toxic side effects. Like epibatidine, tebanicline showed potent analgesic activity against neuropathic pain in both animal and human trials, but with far less toxicity than its parent compound. It acts as a partial agonist at neuronal nicotinic acetylcholine receptors, binding to both the α3β4 and the α4β2 subtypes.

Tebanicline progressed to Phase II clinical trials in humans, but was dropped from further development due to unacceptable incidence of gastrointestinal side effects. However, further research in this area is ongoing, and the development of nicotinic acetylcholine receptor agonists is ongoing. No agents from this class have successfully completed human clinical trials due to their unacceptable side effect profiles.

== Analogs ==
Alan Kozikowski directed research that resulted in such compounds as Sazetidine A (Saz-A) & LF-3-88. More recently, an additional codename was identified that has been called VMY-2-95 [1434047-61-6].

Niodene and nifene are the names of two pyridyl ethers that were recently discovered. Niodene is chemically similar to an agent that was explored by Frank Ivy Carroll at RTI called 5-iodo-A-85380 [213550-82-4] . It is credit-worthy in making the observation that in the case of nicotine, the azetidine is the optimal ring size and not the natural pyrrolidine. It was reasoned that because of the increased conformational rigidity of the azetidine ring relative to the pyrrolidine, a secondary amine can be well-tolerated. Although this discovery was considered important, it was further discovered that dimerization of the azetidine ring is possible. This prompted a move away from the azetidine rings back to the more conventional N-methyl-pyrrolidines.

Goldstein reported a series of agents that are based on a cyclopropane ring.

== See also ==
- Ropanicant (SUVN-911)
