= Phantasmidine =

Names
- Preferred IUPAC name (2aS,4aR,9aR)-7-Chloro-1,2,2a,3,4,4a-hexahydrocyclobuta[4′,5′]pyrrolo[3′,4′:4,5]furo[2,3-b]pyridine

Identifiers
3D model (JSmol)	Interactive image
ChEMBL	ChEMBL1086654
ChemSpider	24664358
PubChem CID	45379093
CompTox Dashboard (EPA)	DTXSID201045588
- InChI: InChI=1S/C11H11ClN2O/c12-9-2-1-6-7-5-13-8-3-4-11(7,8)15-10(6)14-9/h1-2,7-8,13H,3-5H2/t7-,8-,11+/m0/s1 Key: CRXFCGUGNWJSEY-DKCNOQQISA-N; InChI=1/C11H11ClN2O/c12-9-2-1-6-7-5-13-8-3-4-11(7,8)15-10(6)14-9/h1-2,7-8,13H,3-5H2/t7-,8-,11+/m0/s1 Key: CRXFCGUGNWJSEY-DKCNOQQIBN
- SMILES: C1C[C@]23[C@H]1NC[C@H]2C4=C(O3)N=C(C=C4)Cl

Properties
Chemical formula	C_{11}H_{11}ClN_{2}O
Molar mass	222.67 g·mol^{−1}
Appearance	Crystalline solid
Density	1.5±0.1 g/cm^{3}
- Except where otherwise noted, data are given for materials in their standard state (at 25 °C [77 °F], 100 kPa). Infobox references

Phantasmidine is a toxic substance derived from the Ecuadorian poisonous frog Anthony's poison arrow frog (Epipedobates anthonyi), more commonly known as the “phantasmal poison frog”. It is a nicotinic agonist, meaning it binds to nicotinic receptors in the body and mimics the effects of the neurotransmitter acetylcholine. This causes the stimulation of the body's parasympathetic nervous system, which induces many inhibitory behaviors in the body such as decreased heart rate.

Phantasmidine is characterized in the same class as epibatidine, which is a similar nicotinic acetylcholine agonist derived from a poisonous frog species. Some synthetic processes can even generate phantasmidine using epibatidine as a starting reagent. Epibatidine and epibatidine-related compounds have an LD_{50} of around 4 μg in mice; however, the exact LD_{50} of phantasmidine is not known.

Chemical structure of epibatidine

Phantasmidine may find application as an analgesic or muscle relaxant.

== Chemical properties ==
(±)-Phantasmidine is a crystalline solid. The syntheses of phantasmidine result in racemic mixtures, making it difficult to synthesize an individual enantiomer of phantasmidine. However, through the utilization of HPLC, the individual enantiomers can be separated. HPLC thereby allows for the classification and characterization of (-)- and (+)-phantasmidine individually.

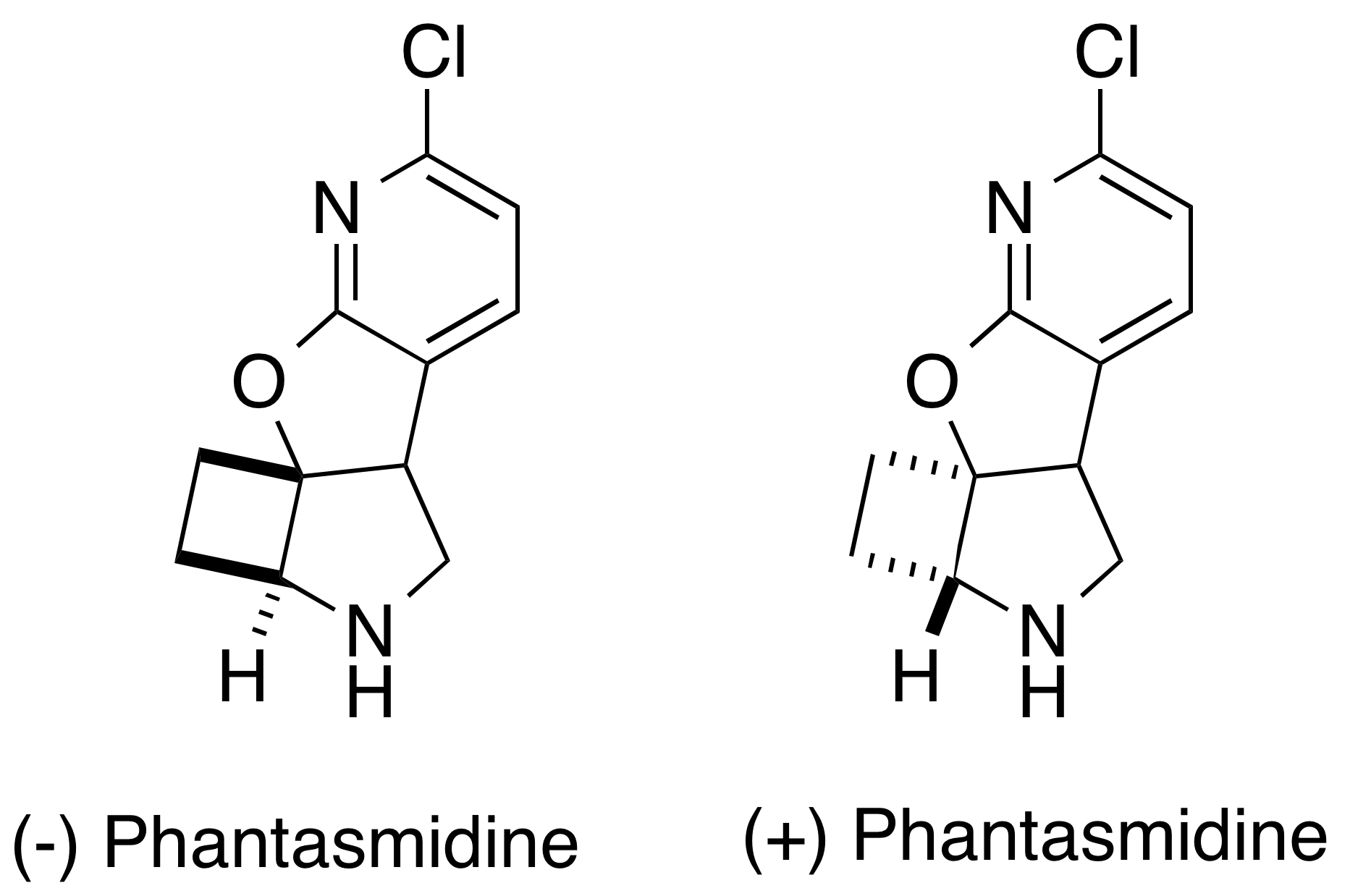
(-)- and (+)-Phantasmidine

The assignation for the ^{1}H NMR shift values of (-)-phantasmidine are listed below (Fitch et al.).

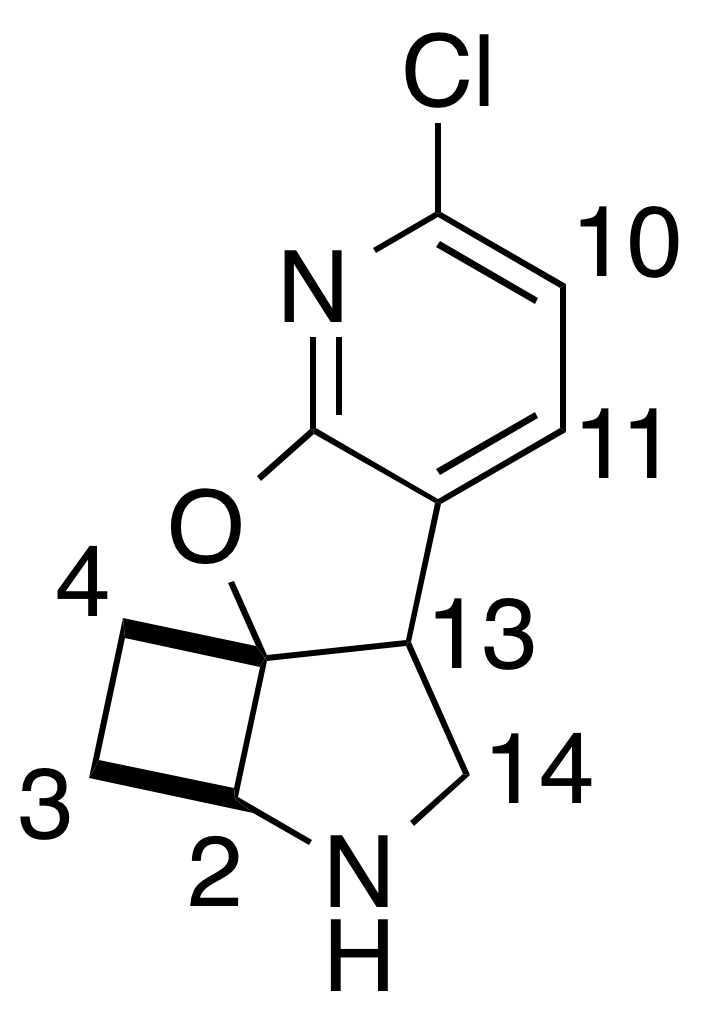
Phantasmidine Proton NMR Label

^{1}H NMR Data for (-)-Phantasmidine
H Position	∂ Value (ppm)	J Value (Hz)
2	4.24	7.5, 7.0
3α	2.22	≈11, 3.4 - 7.1
3β	1.74	–
4α	2.63	11.5
4β	2.38	11.9
10	7.02	7.7
11	7.70	7.7
13	4.08	6.8
14α	3.92	7.2
14β	3.69	12.5

The characterized data gathered from the IR spectrum for (-)-phantasmidine is shown in the table below (Fitch et al. 17) (Fitch et al. 336-337).

IR Absorption Energies
Absorption (cm^{−1})	Functional Group Indicated
3055	5- and 6-membered ring C-H stretch
2997	Cyclobutane C-H
2960	Aromatic C-H
1595	C=C stretch
1418	C=N absorption
1264	C-O absorption adjacent to pyridine C=N

== Biological effects ==
=== Metabolism ===
Phantasmidine is a nicotinic agonist that acts at acetylcholine receptors. It mimics the effects of acetylcholine on the body's neuronal-based nervous systems - the central nervous system (CNS), the peripheral nervous system (PNS), and the muscle-based nervous system (the somatic nervous system).

=== Mechanism of action ===
Nicotinic acetylcholine receptors in general comprise a sub-section of the family of ligand-gated ion channels, of which ions such as Ca^{+2}, Na^{+}, and K^{+} are permeable to the barrier. Phantasmidine is selective for nicotinic acetylcholine receptors (nAChR) containing β4 subunits; however, responses in neuromuscular nAChR (such as β1-containing receptors) and β2-containing neuronal receptors (such as K-177 cells) are also elicited, albeit to a lesser degree (Fitch et al. 331-337).

Studies conducted in mice have proved useful in showing the interaction and relationship of nAChR α- and β-subunits to the body's processes and interaction with this toxin. In particular, α3 and β4 nAChR subunits have been shown to play a role in ganglionic transmission, indicating they play a role in the stimulation of either the parasympathetic nervous system (as an agonist) or the sympathetic nervous system.

- When the β4 subunit was eliminated in mice, the mice were resistant to nicotine-induced seizures and displayed reduced nicotine withdrawal (when compared with wild mice) (Fitch et al. 331-337).
- α4 subunits have been proved to play an important role in preserving the body's nociceptive response (Zhou 120 – 123); when the body experiences pain, the receptors involved in this pathway will signal the autonomic nervous system and create a subsequent sensation of pain. Due to the continuous influx of positive charge (as a result of the depolarization of the cell), the cell will continue to send action potentials, causing the brain to receive constant pain signals.
- β2 subunits have been indicated to play a role in the body's learning, memory, and addiction pathways (Zhou 120 – 123).

The table below summarizes the types of cells that phantasmidine affects as well as the resultant behavior exhibited in the listed species. The depolarization of a cell results from the activation of a cation-permeable membrane, which causes an influx of Ca^{+2} into the cell. This influx of positive charge induces the release of acetylcholine into the body to interact with the parasympathetic nervous system. This, in turn, causes the inhibitory responses exhibited.

Species	Receptor Type	Activity	Cells Affected	Cellular Response	Physiological Response
Rat	α3β4	Active	HEK cells	Membrane depolarization	Stimulation of PNS
Rat	α4β2	Inactive	HEK cells	Membrane depolarization	Pain Response
Rat	α4β4	Active	HEK cells	Membrane depolarization	Pain Response; Stimulation of PNS
Rat	α3β4	Active	HEK cells	Membrane depolarization	Stimulation of PNS
Human	α1β1γ∂	Inactive	TE-671 cells	Membrane depolarization	Stimulation of PNS
Human	α4β2	Inactive	K-177 cells	Membrane depolarization	Pain Response
Human	α3β4	Active	IMR-32 cells	Membrane depolarization	Stimulation of PNS
Human	α3β4	Active	SH-SY5Y cells	Membrane depolarization	Stimulation of PNS

=== Toxicity and treatment ===
Not much about the exact toxicity of phantasmidine is known; however, epibatidines in general are 200 times more potent than morphine (Riley 21). Phantasmidine interacts with the body's stimulation of the parasympathetic nervous system, making it a dangerous inhibitory poison. Symptoms of phantasmidine poisoning may include decreased heart rate, continuous sensations of pain, coma, and (in larger doses) death.

A plausible antidote for phantasmidine poisoning would be mecamylamine, a nAChR antagonist (Zhou 120 – 123). Other nAChR antagonists may serve as effective antidotes for this particular type of poisoning, as they would block nAChR to prevent the acetylcholine agonist from binding to the acetylcholine receptors.

== Synthesis ==
Multiple syntheses of phantasmidine have been proposed, some of which have been included below. The general mechanism for the synthesis of phantasmidine is shown below.

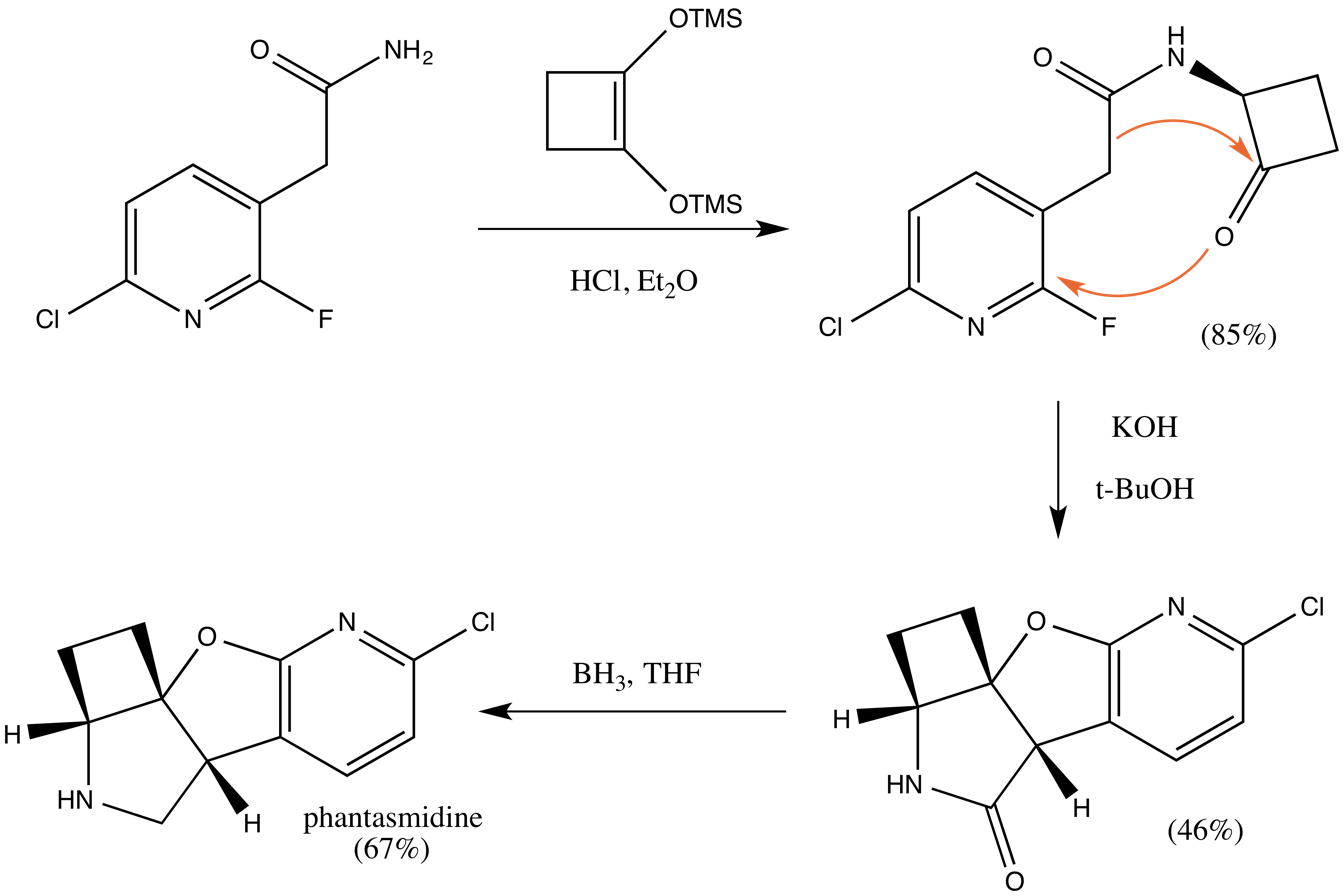
General Synthesis of Phantasmidine

In the general reaction mechanism, 1,2-bis(trimethylsilyloxy)cyclobutene is reacted with the intermediate to form the second product in 85% yield. This is then run under basic conditions to produce an intramolecular aldol reaction followed by an intramolecular nucleophilic aromatic substitution, leading to the lactam product in 46% yield. The final step involves reacting this product with BH3 in THF, then reacting the product with piperazine in MeOH at reflux.

6-chloro-2-fluoro-3-pyridineacetamide is used as an intermediate in most syntheses, which is then reacted through these three general steps to produce phantasmidine. The structure of this intermediate is shown as the starting reagent in the general reaction mechanism above.

Modern synthetic procedures, however, generally begin with 2-chloro-6-fluoropyridine as the starting reagent, due to its commercial availability. This is then converted in several steps to the 6-chloro-2-fluoro-3-pyridineacetamide intermediate. The overall yield of (±)-phantasmidine for the modern synthesis shown below is 8% (Zhou, Q. and B. B. Snider 528).

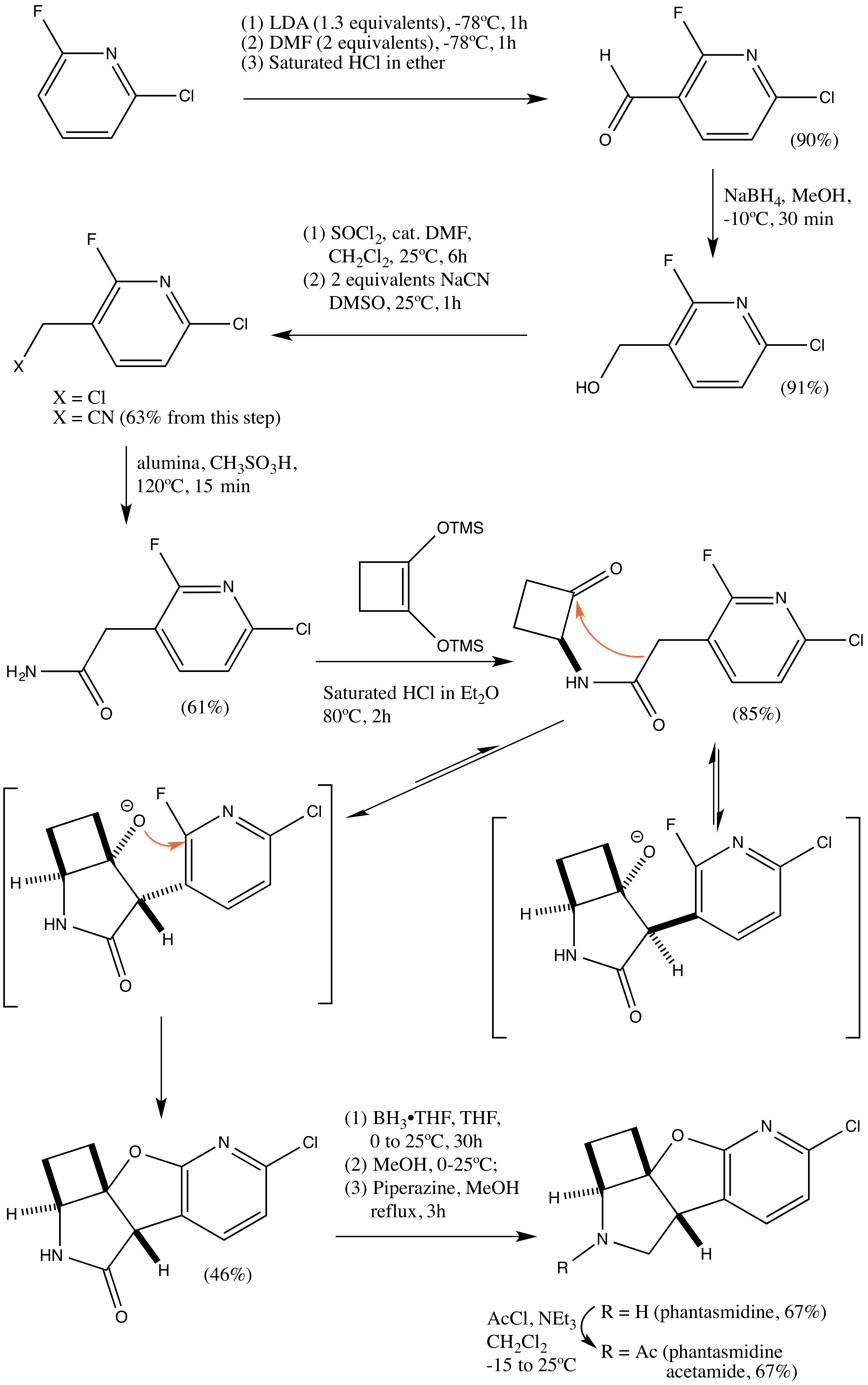
Synthesis of Phantasmidine

=== Analgesics ===
Nicotinic agonists in general have proved to be useful analgesics in treating disorders that respond to nAChR (Fitch et al. 1-17) (Zhou 120-123). For example, phantasmidine or phantasmidine-derivatives are being tested for their potential use as short-acting muscle relaxants. They are also currently being researched as potential analgesics for the treatment of:

- Neurodegenerative disorders (such as dementia caused by Alzheimer's disease)
- Myasthenia gravis
- Tobacco dependence
- Glaucoma
- Tourette syndrome
- Cardiovascular disorders (such as hypertension)
- Psychiatric disorders (such as schizophrenia)
- Pain
- Epilepsy

Such treatments can be administered parenterally (intravenously, intradermally, intramuscularly) or through inhalation of a pharmaceutically-composed aerosol.
