= A-85380 =

Nicotinic agonist related to tebanicline

Clinical data
- Other names: A 85380, A85380, A-159470.

Identifiers
- IUPAC name: 3-(2-azetidinylmethoxy)pyridine
- CAS Number: 161416-98-4 2xHCl salt: 174740-86-4
- PubChem CID: 5310969
- IUPHAR/BPS: 5460
- ChemSpider: 4470513
- ChEBI: CHEBI:230867
- ChEMBL: ChEMBL59986

Chemical and physical data
- Formula: C_{9}H_{12}N_{2}O
- Molar mass: 164.208 g·mol^{−1}
- 3D model (JSmol): Interactive image
- SMILES: C1CN[C@@H]1COC2=CN=CC=C2
- InChI: InChI=1S/C9H12N2O/c1-2-9(6-10-4-1)12-7-8-3-5-11-8/h1-2,4,6,8,11H,3,5,7H2/t8-/m0/s1; Key:XKFMBGWHHBCWCD-QMMMGPOBSA-N

A-85380 is a chemical compound that acts as a potent and selective agonist of nicotinic acetylcholine receptors (nAChRs), particularly the α4β2 subtype. It has been primarily used in scientific research to explore the structure and function of neuronal nAChRs and their role in neurodegenerative diseases, addiction, and cognition.

== Synthesis ==
A-85380 synthesis:

The Mitsunobu reaction between (S)-1-Boc-2-azetidinemethanol [161511-85-9] (1) and 3-hydroxypyridine [109-00-2] (2) gives Tert-butyl (2S)-2-(pyridin-3-yloxymethyl)azetidine-1-carboxylate, PC10801571 (3). Acid deprotection of the urethane completed the synthesis of A-85380 (4).

== See also ==
- 5-Iodo-A-85380
- Ropanicant
- Tebanicline
