= Desformylflustrabromine =

Chemical compound

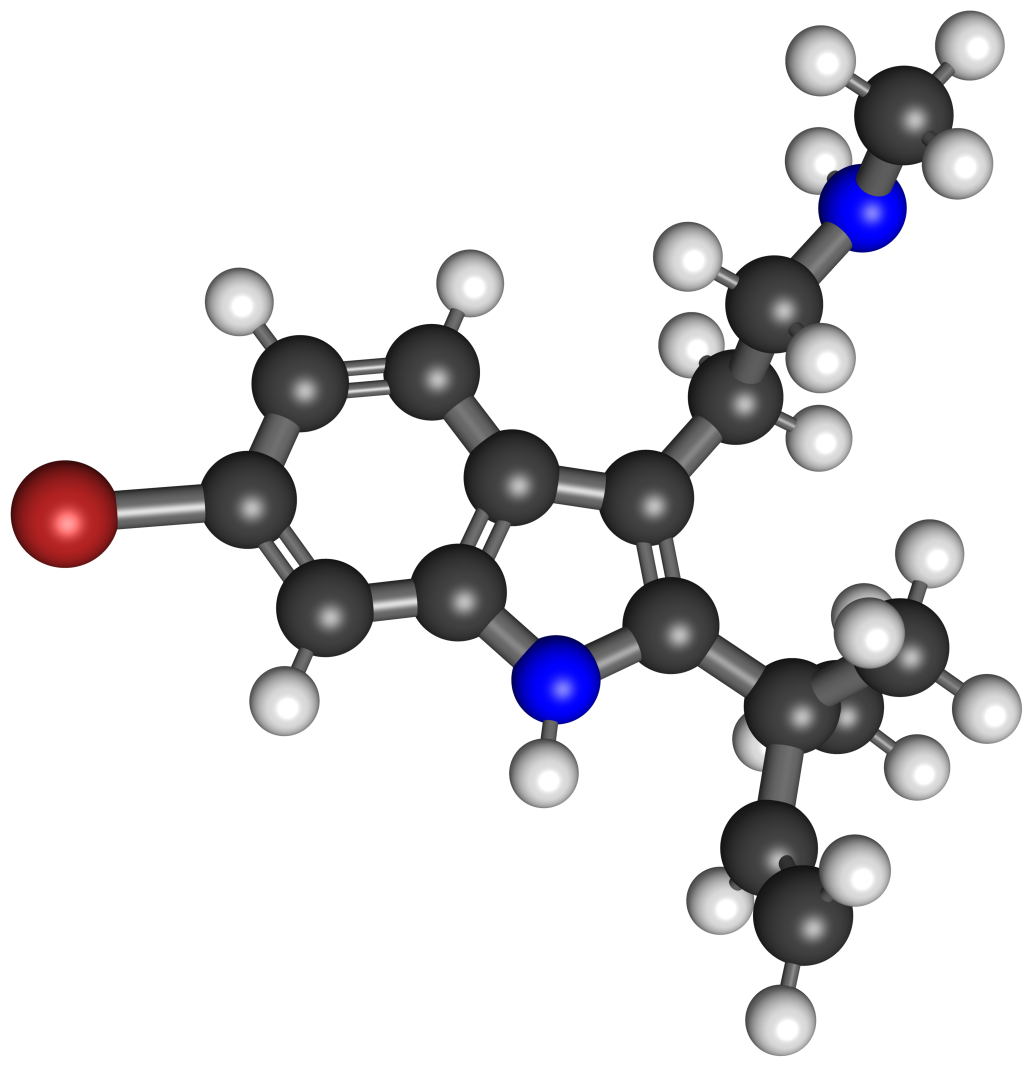

Clinical data
- ATC code: none

Identifiers
- IUPAC name: 2-[6-bromo-2-(2-methylbut-3-en-2-yl)-1H-indol-3-yl]-N-methylethanamine
- CAS Number: 474657-72-2
- PubChem CID: 637026
- ChemSpider: 552693
- UNII: 24C2SY7KUV
- CompTox Dashboard (EPA): DTXSID601046502

Chemical and physical data
- Formula: C_{16}H_{21}BrN_{2}
- Molar mass: 321.262 g·mol^{−1}
- 3D model (JSmol): Interactive image
- SMILES: C=CC(C)(C)c2[nH]c1cc(Br)ccc1c2CCNC
- InChI: InChI=1S/C16H21BrN2/c1-5-16(2,3)15-13(8-9-18-4)12-7-6-11(17)10-14(12)19-15/h5-7,10,18-19H,1,8-9H2,2-4H3; Key:GQHSCJUTJKLZPX-UHFFFAOYSA-N

Desformylflustrabromine (dFBr) is an N-Methyltryptamine derivative indole alkaloid which was first isolated from the marine bryozoan Flustra foliacea.

== Bioactivity ==
dFBr has been identified as a novel positive allosteric modulator of neuronal nicotinic acetylcholine receptor with sub-type specificity for heteromeric receptor with no effect on homomeric sub-type. A recent study has been published which describes the synthesis of water-soluble salts of dFBr and its action has been confirmed as selective potentiator of α4β2 nicotinic acetylcholine receptor responses by using two-electrode voltage clamp whole cell recordings. In the year 2002 it was reported that dFBr was cytotoxic on human colon cancer cell line HCT 116.

Desformylflustrabromine has also been found to be a positive allosteric modulator for the α2β2 subtype of neuronal nicotinic acetylcholine receptor. Additionally it relieves the inhibition of both α2β2 and α4β2 nicotinic acetylcholine receptors by β-Amyloid (1–42) Peptide. Thus desformylflustrabromine can potentially be used in the treatment of Alzheimer's disease. Many of the analogues and derivatives of dFBr are reported to have a potentiating effect on the α4β2 receptors.

Modulation of nicotinic acetylcholine receptor function by desformylflustrabromine has also been found to produce analgesic and anti-allodynic effects in animal models, which could potentially make it of interest for the treatment of neuropathic pain. Anti-addictive and pro-cognitive actions have also been demonstrated. Furthermore, limited experimental data suggests a potential use in treating the compulsive behaviors seen in OCD.
