= Ropanicant =

Neurological drug under development

Clinical data
- Other names: SUVN-911

Identifiers
- IUPAC name: (1R,3S,5R)-3-[(6-Chloropyridin-3-yl)oxymethyl]-2-azabicyclo[3.1.0]hexane
- CAS Number: 2414674-70-5
- PubChem CID: 146026959
- IUPHAR/BPS: 10700
- DrugBank: DB19134
- ChemSpider: 127383388
- UNII: S3VP91C4JO
- ChEMBL: ChEMBL4650579

Chemical and physical data
- Formula: C_{11}H_{13}ClN_{2}O
- Molar mass: 224.69 g·mol^{−1}
- 3D model (JSmol): Interactive image
- SMILES: C1[C@H]2C[C@H]2N[C@@H]1COC3=CN=C(C=C3)Cl
- InChI: InChI=S/C11H13ClN2O/c12-11-2-1-9(5-13-11)15-6-8-3-7-4-10(7)14-8/h1-2,5,7-8,10,14H,3-4,6H2/t7-,8-,10+/m0/s1; Key:PYSCVJMLJRHJGJ-OYNCUSHFSA-N

Ropanicant (SUVN-911) is an investigational new drug under development by Suven Life Sciences Ltd for the treatment of major depressive disorder (MDD) and certain neurological conditions. It acts as an antagonist of the α4β2 nicotinic acetylcholine receptor (nAChR), a target involved in mood regulation and cognitive function. Ropanicant has been shown to increase levels of serotonin and brain-derived neurotrophic factor (BDNF) in the cortex, which may contribute to its antidepressant effects. By modulating neurotransmitter levels—particularly serotonin—it is intended to produce rapid antidepressant effects while minimizing the side effects commonly associated with traditional antidepressants.

== Clinical trials ==
The compound has completed Phase 1 and Phase 2 clinical trials for moderate to severe major depressive disorder. Preliminary studies have explored its potential for a faster onset of action compared to conventional antidepressants. In addition to its investigation in depression, ongoing research is examining its possible use in treating neurodegenerative disorders such as Alzheimer’s disease.

== See also ==
- Tebanicline
- Neonicotinoids
