= Cellular and Molecular Neurobiology =

- Discipline: Neuroscience
- Language: English
- Edited by: Juan M. Saavedra

Publication details
- History: 1981–present
- Publisher: Springer Science+Business Media
- Frequency: 8/year
- Open access: Hybrid
- Impact factor: 3.895 (2017)

Standard abbreviations
- ISO 4: Cell. Mol. Neurobiol.

Indexing
- CODEN: CMNEDI
- ISSN: 0272-4340 (print); 1573-6830 (web)
- OCLC no.: 299333414

Links
- Journal homepage; Online archive

Cellular and Molecular Neurobiology is a peer-reviewed scientific journal covering neuroscience, especially at the cellular and subcellular levels. It was established in 1981 and is published by Springer Science+Business Media. The editor-in-chief is Juan M. Saavedra (Georgetown University).

== Abstracting and indexing ==
The journal is abstracted and indexed in:

- AGRICOLA
- Biological Abstracts
- BIOSIS Previews
- CAB Abstracts
- Chemical Abstracts Service
- Current Contents/Life Sciences
- EBSCO databases
- Embase
- Index Medicus/MEDLINE/PubMed
- Science Citation Index
- Scopus

According to the Journal Citation Reports, the journal has a 2017 impact factor of 3.895.
