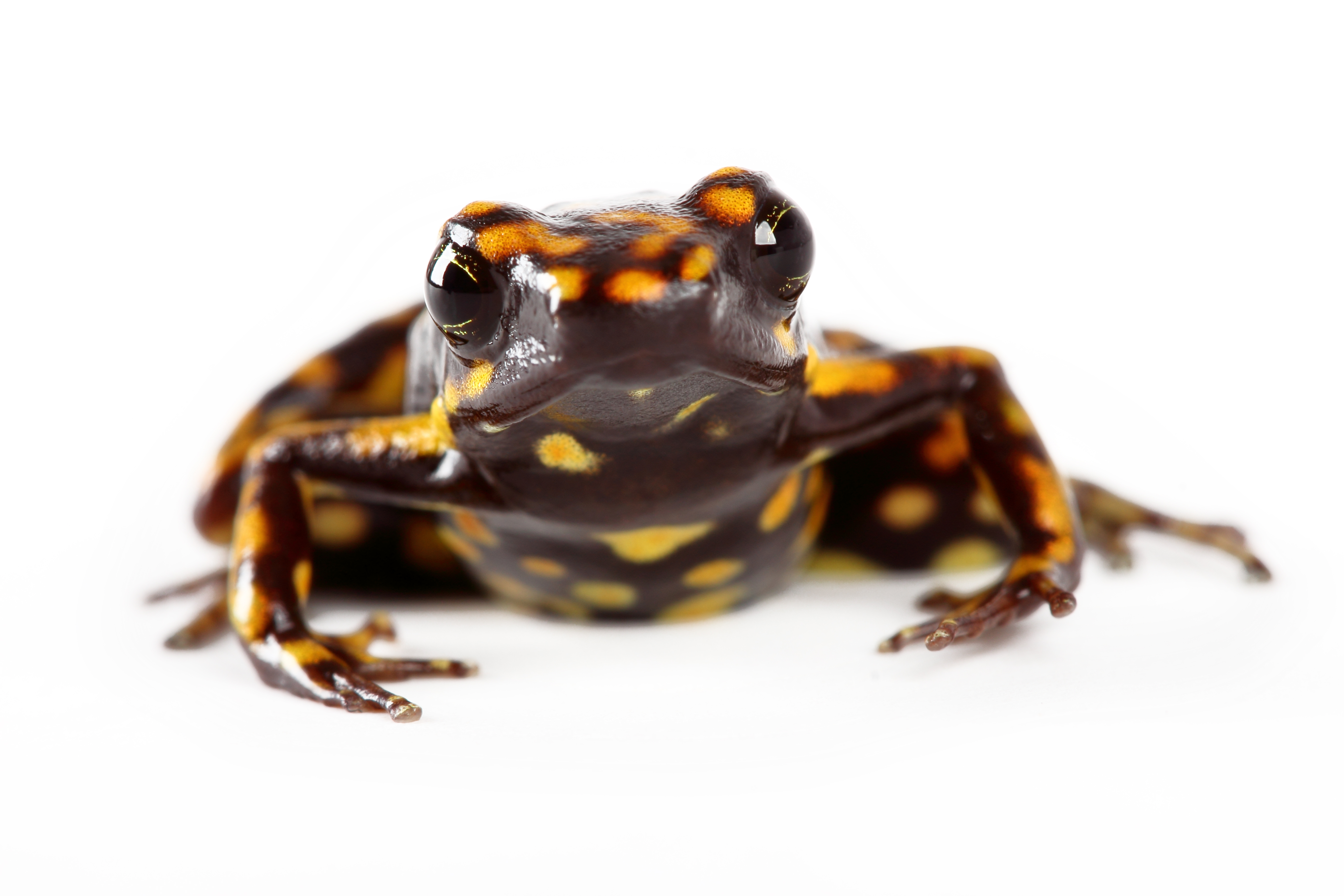

Conservation status
- Data Deficient (IUCN 3.1)

Scientific classification
- Kingdom: Animalia
- Phylum: Chordata
- Class: Amphibia
- Order: Anura
- Family: Dendrobatidae
- Genus: Epipedobates
- Species: E. espinosai

Binomial name
- Epipedobates espinosai (Funkhouser, 1956)

Synonyms
- Phyllobates espinosai Funkhouser, 1956; Dendrobates espinosai Myers, Daly, and Malkin, 1978; Epipedobates espinosai Myers, 1987; Ameerega espinosai Frost, Grant, Faivovich, Bain, Haas, Haddad, de Sá, Channing, Wilkinson, Donnellan, Raxworthy, Campbell, Blotto, Moler, Drewes, Nussbaum, Lynch, Green, and Wheeler, 2006; Dendrobates boulengeri Myers, Daly, and Malkin, 1978; Epipedobates robnatali van der Horst and Woldhuis, 2006; Epipedobates darwinwallacei Cisneros-Heredia and Yánez-Muñoz, 2011

= Epipedobates espinosai =

Species of frog

The Darwin-Wallace poison frog, espinosa poison frog, turquoise-bellied poison frog, or turquoise-bellied poison arrow frog (Epipedobates espinosai) is a species of frog in the family Dendrobatidae endemic to Ecuador.

== Description ==
The adult male frog measures 16.0–17.5 mm in snout-vent length and the adult female frog 15.2–20.38 mm. The skin of the frog's back is coffee or dark red in color with blue and white reticulations or other marks. The flanks are black in color with some turquoise.

== Habitat ==
This diurnal frog lives near streams in lowland forests, where it is associated with the leaf litter. Scientists observed the frog between 858 and 1719 meters above sea level.

== Young ==
Scientists have observed the tadpoles in streams near fast waterfalls. Although they have not observed the females laying eggs, they infer that they lay them on the ground, like other frogs in Epipedobates. They have observed male frogs carrying tadpoles on their backs, in October, so they infer that the male frogs carry the tadpoles to water.

== Threats ==
The IUCN classifies this frog as data deficient. Its threat level is not certain. However, its habitat is subject to deforestation in favor of agriculture, livestock cultivation, and logging. Scientists believe this frog might be part of the international pet trade but do not know if this poses a threat.
