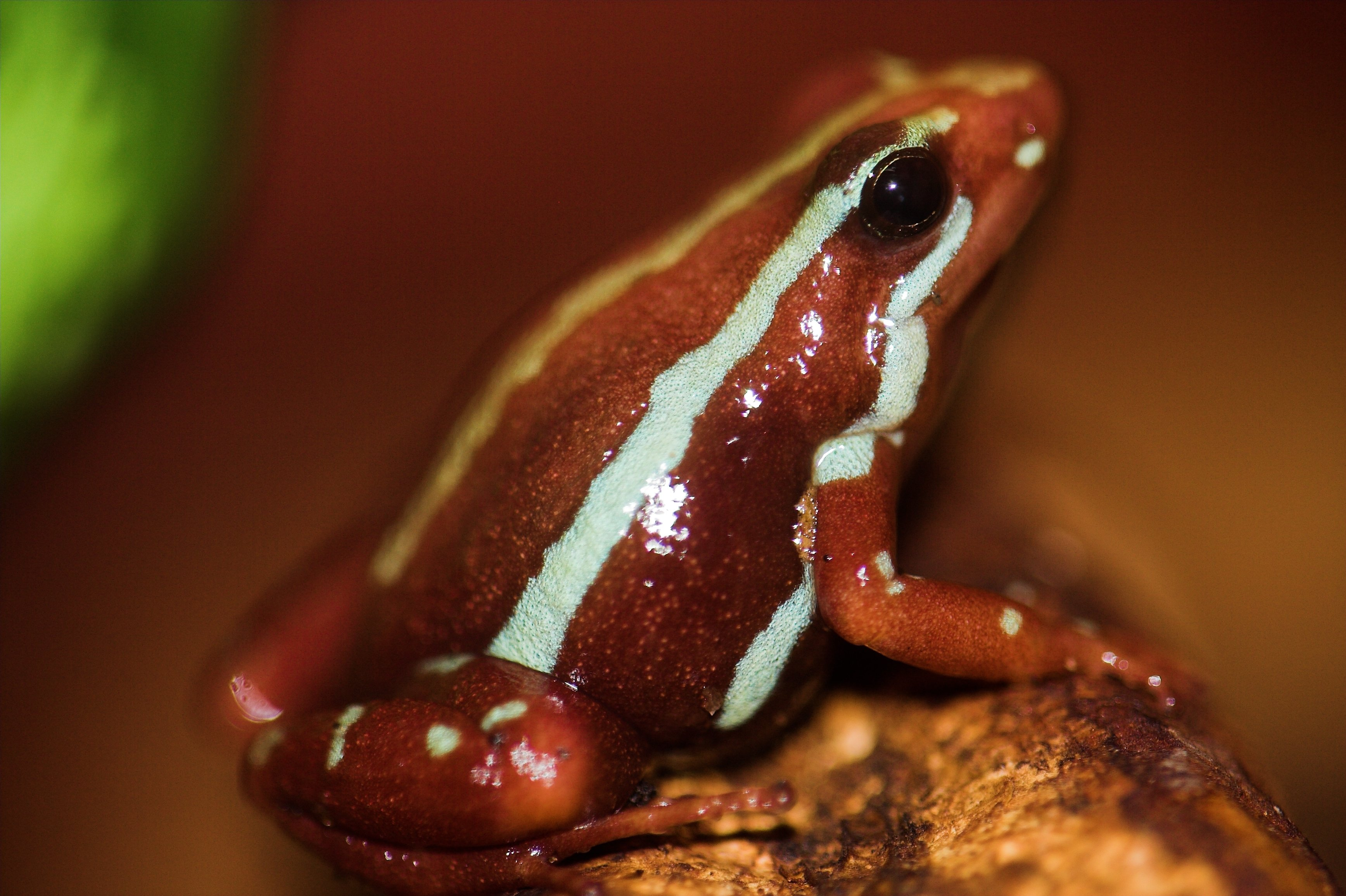
- Epipedobates anthonyi

Scientific classification
- Kingdom: Animalia
- Phylum: Chordata
- Class: Amphibia
- Order: Anura
- Family: Dendrobatidae
- Subfamily: Colostethinae
- Genus: Epipedobates; Myers, 1987

Type species
- Prostherapis tricolor Boulenger, 1899

Diversity
- 8 species (see text)

= Epipedobates =

Genus of amphibians

Epipedobates is a genus of poison dart frogs native to northern South America (Colombia and Ecuador) west of the Andes, including the western slopes. Common name phantasmal poison frogs has been suggested for the genus.

== Taxonomy ==
Epipedobates was erected in 1987 in an attempt to split dendrobatids into monophyletic genera, accommodating species that had until then been placed in Phyllobates. In the major revision of poison dart frogs in 2006, most of the species formerly placed in Epipedobates were then transferred to Ameerega, leaving behind just five species. The species count of Epipedobates had increased to eight by early 2025.

== Description ==
Dorsal colouration is cryptic, brown. A pale oblique lateral stripe is present. Dorsal skin is smooth or with irregularly scattered granules or tubercles, most distinct and prevalent posteriorly. In adult males, third finger is swollen.

== Species ==
There are seven valid described species, listed below. Genetic evidence suggests that there is an eighth valid species that is undescribed as of 2024.

Image	Scientific name	Common name	Distribution
	Epipedobates narinensis (Mueses-Cisneros, Cepeda-Quilindo, and Moreno-Quintero, 2008)		Colombia
	Epipedobates currulao		Southwestern Colombia
	Epipedobates boulengeri (Barbour, 1909)	marbled poison frog or marbled poison-arrow frog	Colombia (Cauca, Nariño, Valle del Cauca Departments, including Gorgona Island) and northwestern Ecuador
	Epipedobates espinosai (Funkhouser, 1956)		Ecuador
	Epipedobates machalilla (Coloma, 1995)		West Ecuador
	Epipedobates tricolor (Boulenger, 1899)	Phantasmal poison frog	Ecuador
	Epipedobates anthonyi (Noble, 1921)	Anthony's poison arrow frog	Ecuador and Peru.
