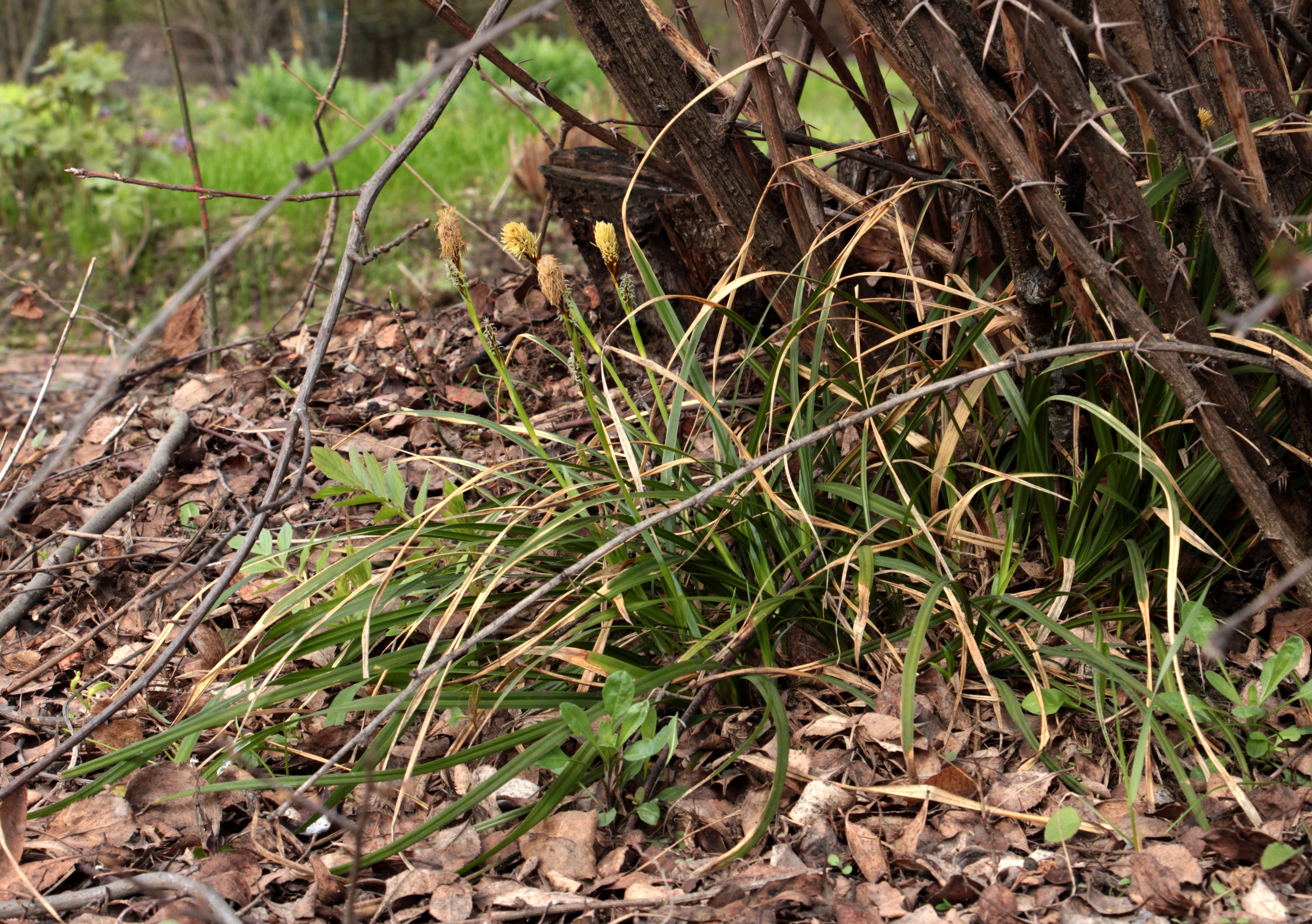
- Habit

Scientific classification
- Kingdom: Plantae
- Clade: Tracheophytes
- Clade: Angiosperms
- Clade: Monocots
- Clade: Commelinids
- Order: Poales
- Family: Cyperaceae
- Genus: Carex
- Species: C. brevicollis

Binomial name
- Carex brevicollis DC.

Synonyms
- Carex rhynchocarpa Heuff.

= Carex brevicollis =

Species of grass-like plant

Carex brevicollis is a species of sedge (genus Carex), found in Spain, France, Slovakia, Hungary, Romania, Bulgaria, Ukraine, the former Yugoslavia, Anatolia, the north Caucasus, and the Transcaucasus. It prefers to grow in calcareous mountain grasslands.

Carex brevicollis contains a harmala alkaloid called brevicolline that can be synthesized in the lab from nicotine.
