= Alpha-4 beta-2 nicotinic receptor =

Type of nicotinic acetylcholine receptor

The alpha-4 beta-2 nicotinic receptor, also known as the α4β2 receptor, is a type of nicotinic acetylcholine receptor implicated in learning, consisting of α4 and β2 subunits. It is located in the brain, where activation yields post- and presynaptic excitation, mainly by increased Na^{+} and K^{+} permeability.

Stimulation of this receptor subtype is also associated with growth hormone secretion. People with the inactive CHRNA4 mutation Ser248Phe are an average of 10 cm (4 inches) shorter than average and predisposed to obesity. A 2015 review noted that stimulation of the α4β2 nicotinic receptor in the brain is responsible for certain improvements in attentional performance; among the nicotinic receptor subtypes, nicotine has the highest binding affinity at the α4β2 receptor (k_{i}=1 nM), which is also the primary biological target that mediates nicotine's addictive properties.

The receptors exist in the two stoichiometries:

- (α4)_{2}(β2)_{3} receptors have high sensitivity to nicotine and low Ca^{2+} permeability (HS receptors)
- (α4)_{3}(β2)_{2} receptors have low sensitivity to nicotine and high Ca^{2+} permeability (LS receptors)

== Structure ==
The α4β2 receptor assemble in two distinct stoichiometric forms. One stoichiometry contains three α4 and two β2 subunits [ (α4)_{3}(β2)_{2} ] whereas the other stoichiometry contains two α4 and three β2 [ (α4)_{2}(β2)_{3} ]. The x-ray structure of the (α4)_{2}(β2)_{3} receptor is known since 2016 and reveals a circular α–β–β–α–β ordering of subunits.

== Ligands ==
=== Agonists ===
- 3-Bromocytisine
- 5-Iodo-A-85380
- Acetylcholine
- Cytisine
- Galantamine
- Epibatidine
- Epiboxidine
- Nicotine
- A-84,543
- A-366,833
- ABT-418
- Arecoline
- Altinicline
- Dianicline
- Ispronicline
- Pozanicline
- Rivanicline
- Tebanicline
- TC-1827
- Varenicline
- Sazetidine A: full agonist on (α4)_{2}(β2)_{3}, 6% efficacy on (α4)_{3}(β2)_{2}
- N-(3-pyridinyl)-bridged bicyclic diamines

=== PAMs ===
- NS-9283: 60-fold left-shifting of concentration-response curve, no change in maximum efficacy
- Desformylflustrabromine
- Further compounds.. (see references →)

=== Antagonists ===
- (−)-7-methyl-2-exo-[3'-(6-[18F]fluoropyridin-2-yl)-5'-pyridinyl]-7-azabicyclo[2.2.1]heptane
- 2-fluoro-3-(4-nitro-phenyl)deschloroepibatidine
- Coclaurine - alkaloid from Nelumbo nucifera
- Mecamylamine
- α-Conotoxin
- PNU-120,596
- Bupropion
- Dihydro-β-erythroidine, selective
- Nitrous oxide
- Isoflurane
- 1-(6-(((R,S)-7-Hydroxychroman-2-yl)methylamino]hexyl)-3-((S)-1-methylpyrrolidin-2-yl)pyridinium bromide (compound 2) (heterobivalent ligand: D2R agonist and nAChR antagonist)

=== NAMs ===
- Oxantel

== See also ==
- α3β2-Nicotinic receptor
- α3β4-Nicotinic receptor
- α6β2-Nicotinic receptor
- α7-Nicotinic receptor
