= Kynuramine =

Names
- IUPAC name 3-Amino-1-(2-aminophenyl)propan-1-one
- Other names Diaminopropiophenone

Identifiers
CAS Number	363-36-0
3D model (JSmol)	Interactive image
ChEBI	CHEBI:73472
ChEMBL	ChEMBL23319
ChemSpider	9311
PubChem CID	9692
UNII	2WR44BV65E
CompTox Dashboard (EPA)	DTXSID70189836
- InChI: InChI=1S/C9H12N2O/c10-6-5-9(12)7-3-1-2-4-8(7)11/h1-4H,5-6,10-11H2 Key: QLPVTIQQFGWSQQ-UHFFFAOYSA-N
- SMILES: C1=CC=C(C(=C1)C(=O)CCN)N

Properties
Chemical formula	C_{9}H_{12}N_{2}O
Molar mass	164.208 g·mol^{−1}
- Except where otherwise noted, data are given for materials in their standard state (at 25 °C [77 °F], 100 kPa). Infobox references

Kynuramine is a chemical compound with the molecular formula C_{9}H_{12}N_{2}O. It is the prototypical member of the class of biogenic amines known collectively as kynuramines. Kynuramine is produced by the decarboxylation of kynurenine and is a metabolite of tryptophan.

Kynuramine is an α-adrenoceptor inhibitor.

In biochemistry, kynuramine has been used as a substrate in assays used to measure amine oxidase activity.
