= Epibatidine =

Toxic chemical from some poison dart frogs

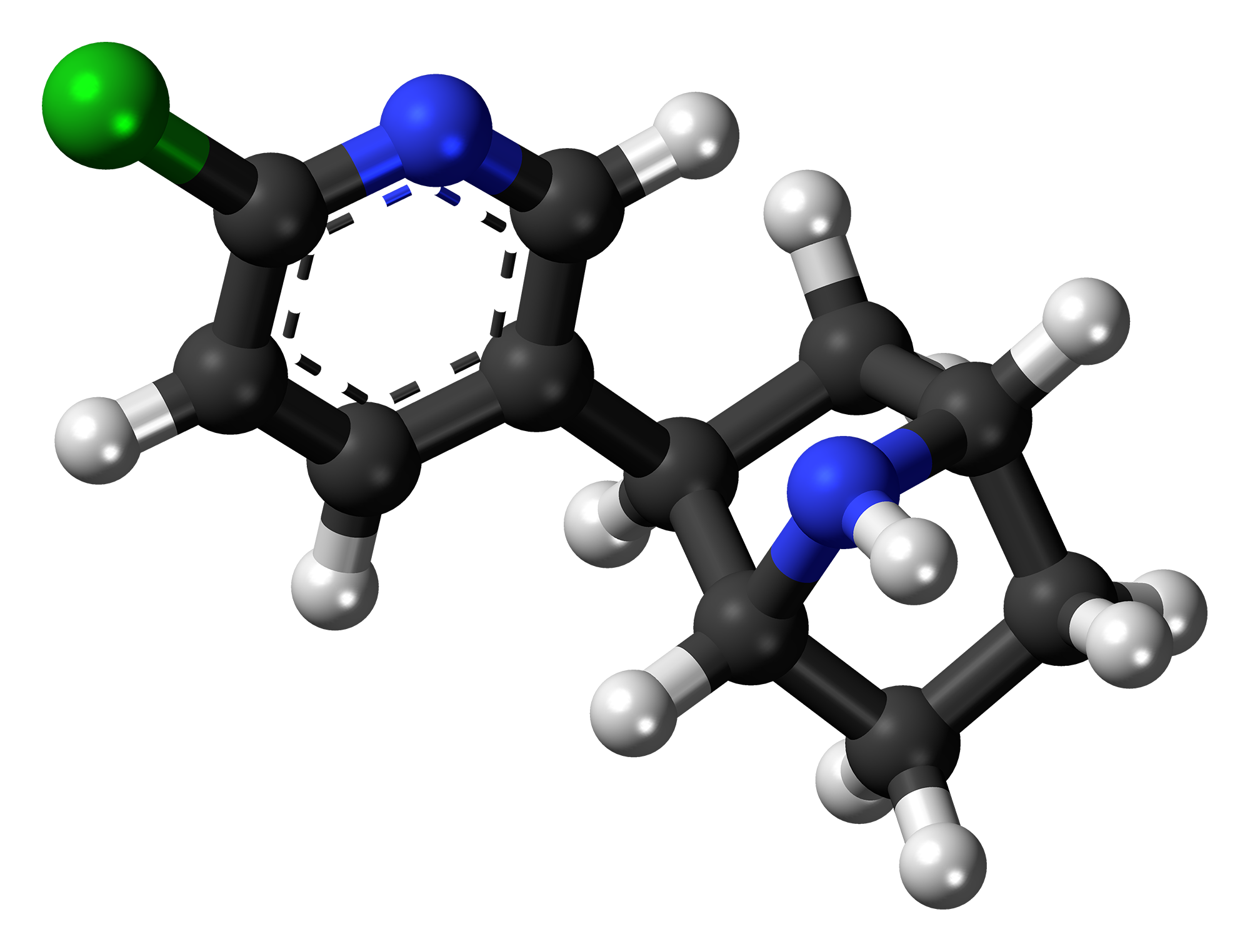

Identifiers
- IUPAC name: (1R,2R,4S)-(-)-6-(6-Chloro-3-pyridyl)-7-azabicyclo[2.2.1]heptane
- CAS Number: 140111-52-0
- PubChem CID: 1204
- DrugBank: DB07720
- ChemSpider: 10399316
- UNII: M6K314F1XX
- KEGG: C11690
- ChEBI: CHEBI:4803
- ChEMBL: ChEMBL298826
- ECHA InfoCard: 100.162.281

Chemical and physical data
- Formula: C_{11}H_{13}ClN_{2}
- Molar mass: 208.69 g·mol^{−1}
- 3D model (JSmol): Interactive image
- Density: 1.2 ± 0.1 g/cm^{3} g/cm^{3}
- SMILES: ClC1=CC=C([C@@H]2C[C@]3([H])CC[C@@]2([H])N3)C=N1
- InChI: InChI=1S/C11H13ClN2/c12-11-4-1-7(6-13-11)9-5-8-2-3-10(9)14-8/h1,4,6,8-10,14H,2-3,5H2/t8-,9+,10+/m0/s1; Key:NLPRAJRHRHZCQQ-IVZWLZJFSA-N

Epibatidine is a chlorinated alkaloid that is secreted by the Ecuadorian frog Epipedobates anthonyi and poison dart frogs from the genus Ameerega. It was discovered by John W. Daly in 1974, but its structure was not fully elucidated until 1992. Whether epibatidine occurs naturally remains controversial due to challenges in conclusively identifying the compound from the limited samples collected by Daly. By the time that high-resolution spectrometry was used in 1991, there remained less than one milligram of extract from Daly's samples, raising concerns about possible contamination. Samples from other batches of the same species of frog failed to yield epibatidine.

Epibatidine is a neurotoxin that interferes with nicotinic and muscarinic acetylcholine receptors. These receptors are involved in the transmission of painful sensations, and in movement, among other functions. Epibatidine causes full body numbness, which can rapidly progress to full body paralysis. Doses are lethal when the paralysis causes respiratory arrest. Originally, it was thought that epibatidine could be useful as a drug. However, because of its unacceptable therapeutic index, it is no longer being researched for potential therapeutic uses.

== History ==
Epibatidine was first documented by John W. Daly in 1974. It was isolated from the skin of Epipedobates anthonyi frogs collected by Daly and colleague, Charles Myers. Between 1974 and 1979, Daly and Myers collected the skins of nearly 3000 frogs from various sites in Ecuador, after finding that a small injection of a preparation from their skin caused analgesic (painkilling) effects in mice that resembled those of an opioid. Despite its common name - Anthony's Poison Arrow frog - suggesting that it was used by natives when hunting, a paper written by Daly in 2000 claimed that there was no local folklore or folk medicine surrounding the frogs and that they were considered largely unimportant by the locals.

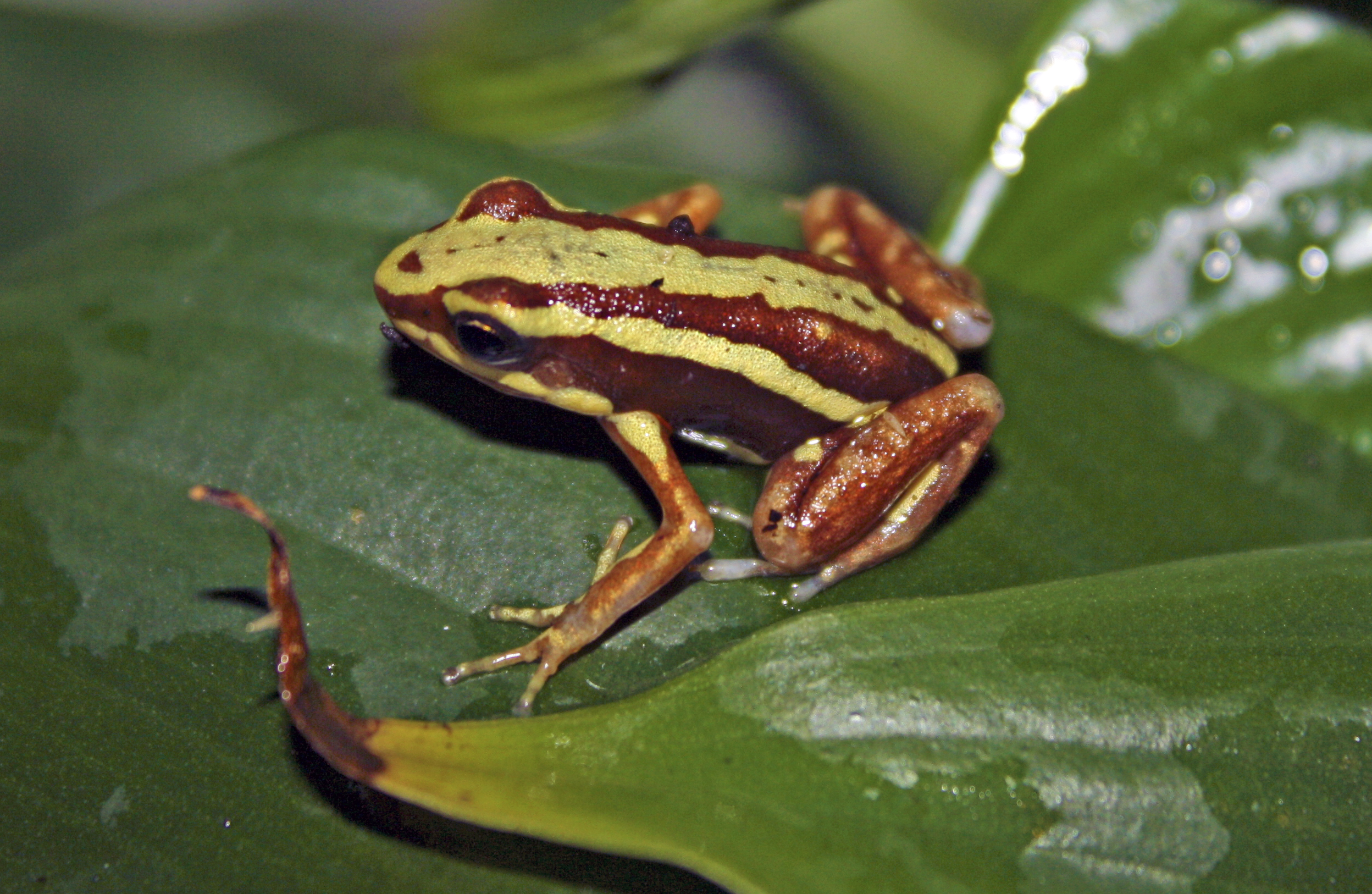
Poison dart frog (Epipedobates tricolor) on a leaf

The structure of epibatidine was elucidated in 1992, an effort hindered by E. anthonyi gaining IUCN protected status in 1984. Furthermore, these frogs do not produce the toxin when bred and reared in captivity, because they do not synthesize epibatidine themselves. Like other poison dart frogs, they instead obtain it through their diet and then sequester it on their skin. Likely dietary sources are beetles, ants, mites, and flies. Daly and Charles noticed that epibatidine was produced from their diet due to their return trip to Ecuador in 1976 when they found that at one site, none of the frogs present produced epibatidine; they discovered that only the frogs at certain sites with the dietary means allowed these frogs to produce epibatidine. Overcoming the difficulties, the structure was eventually determined, and the first synthesis of epibatidine was completed in 1993. Many other synthesis methods have been developed since.

Because of its analgesic effect and non-opioid nature, there was intense interest in epibatidine's use as a drug. However, it was soon found that it cannot be used in humans because the dose resulting in toxic symptoms is too low for it to be safe.

== Synthesis ==
Several total synthesis routes (over 100) have been devised due to the relative scarcity of epibatidine in nature. The naturally occurring compound is the (-)-enantiomer; the (+)-enantiomer does not occur naturally. It was later determined that the (+) and (-) enantiomers had equivalent analgesic as well as toxic effects.

After the discovery of the structure of epibatidine, more than fifty ways to synthesize it in the laboratory have been devised. In the first reported example, a nine-step procedure produces the substance as a racemate. The process has proven to be quite productive, with a yield of about 40%.

A racemic synthesis reported by E. J. Corey starting from chloronicotinaldehyde is outlined below:

The chemical synthesis of epibatidine by Corey

In addition to Corey's method, other notable methods include those of Broka, Huang and Shen, and Clayton and Regan. Another synthesis method was published in 2013 by the Russian State Research Institute of Organic Chemistry and Technology.

=== Synthetic analogs ===
A number of approaches to discovering structural analogs of epibatidine that maintain analgesic effects, but without the toxicity, have been attempted. For example, Abbott Laboratories has produced derivatives of epibatidine including tebanicline (ABT-594). Tebanicline retains analgesic properties while avoiding paralysis by still binding to receptors that control pain perception and having a low affinity for muscle-type nicotinic acetylcholine receptors (nAChR) reducing its paralysis effect. Other epibatidine analogs include ABT-418, epiboxidine, and their derivatives. A synthesis of epibatidine, utilizing a microbial hydroxylation of an unactivated carbon in a 7-azanorbornane was published in 1999.

== Chemical structure ==
Epibatidine is a pyrrolidine pyridine with a structure similar to that of nicotine. It is a hygroscopic oily substance which is a base.

== Biological effects ==
=== Mechanism of action ===
Epibatidine has two mechanisms of action: it can bind to either nicotinic acetylcholine receptors (nAChR) or muscarinic acetylcholine receptors (mAChR). Specifically, the analgesic property of epibatidine is believed to take place by its binding to the α4/β2 subtype of nicotinic receptors. Epibatidine also binds to the α3/β4 subtype and to a much lesser extent α7 receptors (affinity 300-fold less than for α4/β2) The rank order of affinities for the muscle nicotinic receptors is αε > αγ > αδ.

Nicotinic acetylcholine receptors are found in the post-synaptic membranes of nerve cells. These receptors are an example of gated ion channels where binding by a ligand causes a conformational change allowing ions to cross the membrane into the cell. They propagate neurotransmission in the central and peripheral nervous system. When neurotransmitters bind to these receptors, ion channels open, allowing Na^{+} and Ca^{2+} ions to move across the membrane. This depolarizes the post-synaptic membrane, inducing an action potential that propagates the signal. This signal will ultimately induce release of dopamine and norepinephrine, resulting in an antinociceptive effect on the organism. The usual neurotransmitter for nAChR is acetylcholine. However, other substances (such as epibatidine and nicotine) are also able to bind to the receptor and induce a similar, if not identical, response. Epibatidine has an extremely high affinity for nAChRs, depending on the receptor subtype, from 0.05 nM at the α4β2 subtype to 22 nM at the α7 subtype. Affinity as well as efficacy (and thus also potency) are much higher than for nicotine.

The paralytic property of epibatidine takes place after its binding to muscle-type nicotinic receptors.

Low doses of epibatidine will only affect the nAChRs, due to a higher affinity to nAChRs than to mAChRs. Higher doses, however, will cause epibatidine to bind to the mAChRs.

Both (+)- and (-)-enantiomers of epibatidine are biologically active, and both have similar binding affinities to nAChRs Only the (+)-enantiomer does not induce tolerance. While this may be a potential therapeutic advantage over morphine, epibatidine has not entered clinical trials because even very small doses are lethal to rodents.

=== Symptoms ===
Epibatidine has several toxic consequences. Empirically proven effects include splanchnic sympathetic nerve discharge and increased arterial pressure. The nerve discharge effects can cause antinociception partially mediated by agonism of central nicotinic acetylcholine receptors at low doses of epibatidine; 5 μg/kg. At higher doses, however, epibatidine will cause paralysis and loss of consciousness, coma and eventually death. The median lethal dose (LD_{50}) of epibatidine lies between 1.46 μg/kg and 13.98 μg/kg. This makes epibatidine somewhat more toxic than dioxin (with an average LD_{50} of 22.8 μg/kg). Due to the small difference between its toxic concentration and antinociceptive concentration, its therapeutic uses are very limited.

In research on mice, administration of doses greater than 5 μg/kg of epibatidine caused a dose-dependent paralyzing effect on the organism. With doses over 5 μg/kg, symptoms included hypertension (increased blood pressure), paralysis in the respiratory system, seizures, and, ultimately, death. The symptoms do, however, change drastically when lower doses are given. Mice became resistant to pain and heat with none of the negative effects of higher doses.

=== Pharmacology ===
Epibatidine most effectively enters the body through injection. In vitro studies seem to suggest that epibatidine is hardly, if at all, metabolized in the human body.

Also there is currently little information on the path of clearance from the body. Maximum concentration in the brain is reached at about 30 minutes after entering the body.

=== Potential medical uses ===
Epibatidine has a high analgesic potency, as stated above. Studies show it has a potency at least 200 times that of morphine. As the compound was not addictive nor did it cause habituation,, it was initially thought to be very promising to replace morphine as a painkiller. However, the therapeutic concentration is very close to the toxic concentration. This means that even at a therapeutic dose (5 μg/kg), some epibatidine might bind to the muscarinic acetylcholine receptors and cause adverse effects, such as hypertension, bradycardia and muscular paresis.

Compared to the gold standard in pain management, morphine, rodents administered epibatidine needed only 2.5 μg/kg (11.98 nmol/kg) to initiate a pain-relieving effect whilst the same effect required approximately 10 mg/kg (35.05 μmol/kg) of morphine (approx. 2,900 times the efficacy.) Currently, only rudimentary research into epibatidine's effects has yet been performed; the drug has been administered only to rodents for analysis at this time.

=== Alleged use as a poison ===
In February 2026, the UK, Sweden, France, Germany, and the Netherlands made a joint statement alleging that the death of Russian dissident Alexei Navalny was due to lethal poisoning with epibatidine by the Russian government, noting that the toxin is not naturally found in Russia.

=== Antidote ===
The antidote to epibatidine is mecamylamine, a nicotinic acetylcholine receptor antagonist that is non-selective and non-competitive. Both the (+) and the (-) enantiomers of mecamylamine appear to reverse the effect of this alkaloid.

== See also ==
- 6-Chloronicotine
- Arrow poison
- Batrachotoxin, an unrelated and more potent toxin also isolated from dart frogs
- Nemertelline
- Nicotelline
- Phantasmidine
- Tetrodotoxin
