= TC-1827 =

Names
- Preferred IUPAC name (2S,4E)-N-Methyl-5-(pyrimidin-5-yl)pent-4-en-2-amine

Identifiers
CAS Number	547741-76-4
3D model (JSmol)	Interactive image
ChemSpider	8329797
PubChem CID	10154289
UNII	N5H5EX53UR
CompTox Dashboard (EPA)	DTXSID701029957
- InChI: InChI=1S/C10H15N3/c1-9(11-2)4-3-5-10-6-12-8-13-7-10/h3,5-9,11H,4H2,1-2H3/b5-3+/t9-/m0/s1 Key: VZNTWLIIJWUCEP-SGRBOOSSSA-N
- SMILES: C[C@H](NC)C/C=C/C1=CN=CN=C1

Properties
Chemical formula	C_{10}H_{15}N_{3}
Molar mass	177.251 g·mol^{−1}
- Except where otherwise noted, data are given for materials in their standard state (at 25 °C [77 °F], 100 kPa). Infobox references

TC-1827 is an orally active, selective agonist of the α_{4}β_{2} nicotinic receptors. Administration of TC-1827 improved memory and learning in a variety of rodents and increased long-term potentiation in hippocampal slices. In addition, the compound was without significant cardiovascular side effects, except for a small, transient rise in arterial blood pressure. The pro-cognitive effects of TC-1827 last much longer than the short half-life (0.2–1.0 hours) would suggest.
