= A-84,543 =

Chemical compound

Identifiers
- IUPAC name: 3-[[(2S)-1-Methyl-2-pyrrolidinyl]methoxy]pyridine
- CAS Number: 161416-43-9
- PubChem CID: 9794141
- ChemSpider: 7969908
- UNII: WSK2XM6RPF
- ChEMBL: ChEMBL84149
- CompTox Dashboard (EPA): DTXSID00430767

Chemical and physical data
- Formula: C_{11}H_{16}N_{2}O
- Molar mass: 192.262 g·mol^{−1}
- 3D model (JSmol): Interactive image
- SMILES: CN1CCC[C@H]1COc2cccnc2
- InChI: InChI=1S/C11H16N2O/c1-13-7-3-4-10(13)9-14-11-5-2-6-12-8-11/h2,5-6,8,10H,3-4,7,9H2,1H3/t10-/m0/s1; Key:MVLJPWPLDPHKST-JTQLQIEISA-N

A-84543 is a drug developed by Abbott, which acts as an agonist at neural nicotinic acetylcholine receptors with high selectivity for the α4β2 subtype. It is widely used in scientific research into the structure and function of this receptor subtype and has been the lead compound for the development of a large family of related derivatives.
