= Nifene =

Chemical compound

Nifene (^{18}F)

Clinical data
- ATC code: None

Legal status
- Legal status: Research compound

Identifiers
- IUPAC name: 3-[(2S)-2,5-Dihydro-1H-pyrrol-2-ylmethoxy]-2-^{18}F-fluoropyridine
- CAS Number: 912843-71-1
- PubChem CID: 6917075
- ChemSpider: 5292349
- UNII: 14VE482C8C
- CompTox Dashboard (EPA): DTXSID40238481

Chemical and physical data
- Formula: C_{10}H_{11}FN_{2}O
- Molar mass: 194.209 g·mol^{−1}
- 3D model (JSmol): Interactive image
- SMILES: C1C=C[C@H](N1)COC2=C(N=CC=C2)[18F]
- InChI: InChI=1S/C10H11FN2O/c11-10-9(4-2-6-13-10)14-7-8-3-1-5-12-8/h1-4,6,8,12H,5,7H2/t8-/m0/s1/i11-1; Key:GHHQHFNDKOQCRS-IZFLLFDKSA-N

Nifene is a high affinity, selective nicotinic α4β2* receptor partial agonist used in medical research for nicotinic acetylcholine receptors, usually in the form of nifene (^{18}F) as a positron emission tomography (PET) radiotracer.

Nifene has been used to assess the efficacy of acetylcholinesterase inhibitors in animal models, because the neurotransmitter acetylcholine competes with the binding of nifene at the nicotinic receptor site. Learning and behavior studies in animal models using nifene have suggested a potential role of the nicotinic receptors located in distinct white matter tracts. Nifene studies in animal models of lung cancer have suggested an upregulation of the nicotinic receptor in the lung tumors. Novel PET and SPECT imaging agents as potential receptor antagonists have been developed based on the structure of nifene; niodene for SPECT, nifrolene for PET and niofene for PET/SPECT. These new derivatives take advantage of the unique in vivo imaging properties of nifene. Human studies with (^{18}F)-nifene make it a promising nicotinic α4β2* receptor PET radiotracer for scientific research and has exhibited reliable test-retest reproducibility. Human white matter thalamic radiations (or tracts) were well demarcated and quantified using (^{18}F)-nifene.

== See also ==
- 5-Iodo-A-85380
