= Ortho-Methylphenylpiperazine =

Chemical compound

ortho-Methylphenylpiperazine

Clinical data
- Other names: oMPP; oMePP; 2-Methylphenylpiperazine; 2-MPP; 2-MePP; 1-(o-Tolyl)piperazine; PAL-169

Identifiers
- IUPAC name: 1-(2-Methylphenyl)piperazine
- CAS Number: 39512-51-1
- PubChem CID: 91965
- ChemSpider: 83039
- UNII: 6P26KQQ7V5
- ChEMBL: ChEMBL9746
- CompTox Dashboard (EPA): DTXSID00192651
- ECHA InfoCard: 100.049.511

Chemical and physical data
- Formula: C_{11}H_{16}N_{2}
- Molar mass: 176.263 g·mol^{−1}
- 3D model (JSmol): Interactive image
- SMILES: CC1=CC=CC=C1N2CCNCC2
- InChI: InChI=1S/C11H16N2/c1-10-4-2-3-5-11(10)13-8-6-12-7-9-13/h2-5,12H,6-9H2,1H3; Key:WICKLEOONJPMEQ-UHFFFAOYSA-N

ortho-Methylphenylpiperazine (also known as oMPP, oMePP, 1-(2-methylphenyl)piperazine, 2-MPP, and 2-MePP) is a psychoactive designer drug of the phenylpiperazine group. It acts as a serotonin–norepinephrine–dopamine releasing agent (SNDRA), with EC_{50} values for induction of monoamine release of 175 nM for serotonin, 39.1 nM for norepinephrine, and 296–542 nM for dopamine. As such, it has about 4.5-fold preference for induction of norepinephrine release over serotonin, and about 7.6- to 13.9-fold preference for induction of norepinephrine release over dopamine.

The 2,3-methyl and 4-methyl analogues show diminished activity as dopamine releasing agents with respective EC_{50} values of 1,207 nM and 9,523 nM. However, at the same time, induction of serotonin and norepinephrine release is retained and more balanced in the 2,3-methyl analogue, with respective EC_{50} values of 26 nM and 56 nM.

== See also ==
- Substituted piperazine
- ortho-Bromophenylpiperazine
