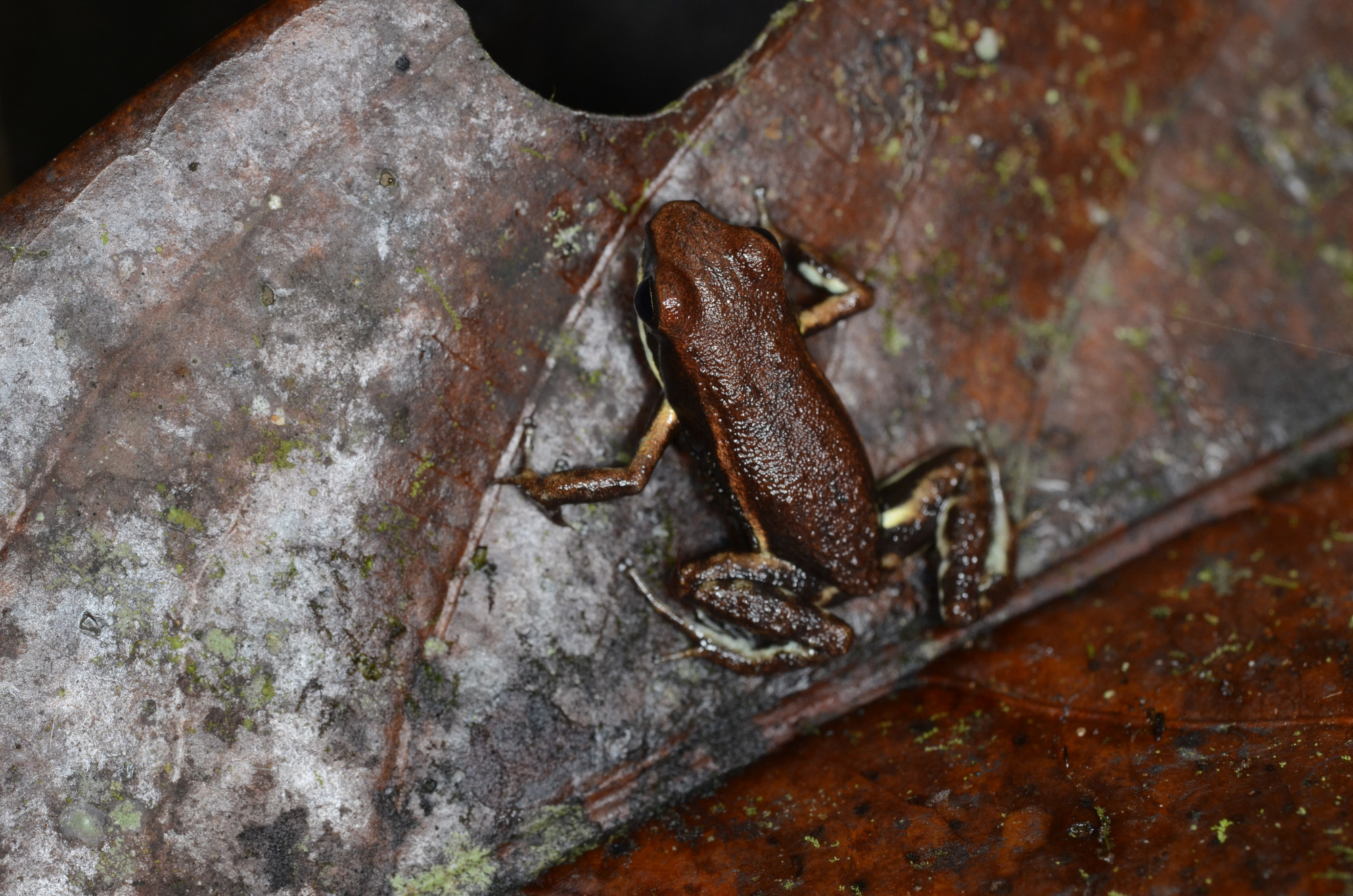

Conservation status
- Least Concern (IUCN 3.1)

Scientific classification
- Kingdom: Animalia
- Phylum: Chordata
- Class: Amphibia
- Order: Anura
- Family: Dendrobatidae
- Genus: Epipedobates
- Species: E. boulengeri

Binomial name
- Epipedobates boulengeri (Barbour, 1909)

Synonyms
- Prostherapis femoralis Barbour, 1905 (junior homonym of Prostherapis femoralis Boulenger, 1884; Prostherapis boulengeri Barbour, 1909; Phyllobates boulengeri (Barbour, 1909); Colostethus boulengeri (Barbour, 1909); Dendrobates boulengeri (Barbour, 1909); Ameerega boulengeri (Barbour, 1909)

= Marbled poison frog =

Species of amphibian

The marbled poison frog or marbled poison-arrow frog (Epipedobates boulengeri) is a species of frog in the family Dendrobatidae found in western Colombia (Cauca, Nariño, Valle del Cauca Departments, including Gorgona Island) and northwestern Ecuador, at elevations of 10–1,500 m (33–4,921 ft) asl. It likely represents a species complex of at least two species.

== Description ==
Males measure 15–20 mm (0.59–0.79 in) and females 17–21 mm (0.67–0.83 in) in snout–vent length. Colouration is variable; dorsum is dark reddish to uniform dark brown, sides are black. There is a pale yellowish or creamy white lateral line and cream-coloured dorsolateral line. Iris is dark coppery black.

== Diet ==
Diet is varied and includes mites, ants, coleopterans, dipterans, homopterans, and colembolas.

== Habitat and conservation ==
Its natural habitats are dense moist tropical rainforests as well as altered habitats like gardens and railway tunnels.

The frog's known range includes many protected parks: Reserva Ecológica Cayapas-Mataje, Parque Nacional Mache Chindul, Reserva Ecológica Cotacachi-Cayapas, Reserva Ecológica Los Illinizas, Parque Natural Isla Gorgona, Reserva Natural Biotopo, and Reserva Natural Indígena La Nutria.

== Threats ==
The IUCN classifies this frog as least concern of extinction. Scientists note that it is tolerant to habitat disturbance. What threat it faces comes from habitat loss from deforestation associated with agriculture, including illegal agriculture, and logging. The introduction of invasive fish also poses some threat. Scientists noted the presence of the fungus Batrachochytrium dendrobatidis on this frog but they did not note any specimens who were sick with the corresponding fungal disease chytridiomycosis, which kills frogs. This animal shows some presence on the international pet trade, but scientists do not know if this is a danger to the frog or not.
