= A-366,833 =

Chemical compound

Identifiers
- IUPAC name: 5-[(1R,5S)-3,6-Diazabicyclo[3.2.0]hept-6-yl]pyridine-3-carbonitrile
- CAS Number: 370882-41-0
- PubChem CID: 9834234
- ChemSpider: 8009955
- UNII: 6XRK9HTJ6M
- ChEMBL: ChEMBL239931

Chemical and physical data
- Formula: C_{11}H_{12}N_{4}
- Molar mass: 200.245 g·mol^{−1}
- 3D model (JSmol): Interactive image
- Melting point: 101.4–102.9 °C (214.5–217.2 °F)
- SMILES: N#CC1=CN=CC(N2[C@]3([H])CNC[C@]3([H])C2)=C1
- InChI: InChI=1S/C11H12N4/c12-2-8-1-10(5-13-3-8)15-7-9-4-14-6-11(9)15/h1,3,5,9,11,14H,4,6-7H2/t9-,11-/m1/s1; Key:GPXAWLDGWSBLKM-MWLCHTKSSA-N

A-366,833 is a drug developed by Abbott, which acts as an agonist at neural nicotinic acetylcholine receptors selective for the α4β2 subtype, and has been researched for use as an analgesic, although it has not passed clinical trials. Its structure has a nicotinonitrile (3-cyanopyridine) core bound through C5 to the N6 of (1R,5S)-3,6-diazabicyclo[3.2.0]heptane.
