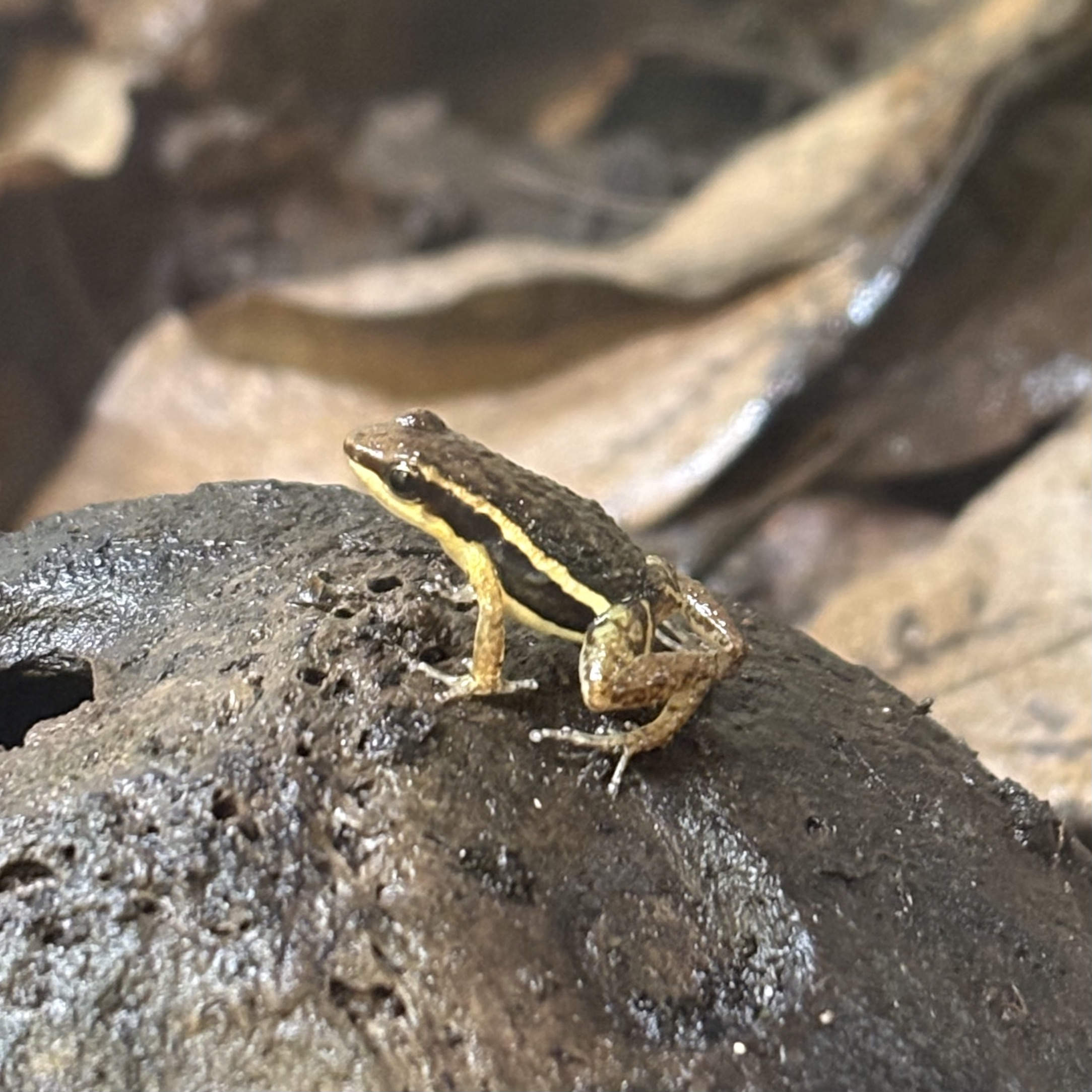

Conservation status
- Least Concern (IUCN 3.1)

Scientific classification
- Kingdom: Animalia
- Phylum: Chordata
- Class: Amphibia
- Order: Anura
- Family: Dendrobatidae
- Genus: Epipedobates
- Species: E. machalilla

Binomial name
- Epipedobates machalilla (Coloma, 1995)

Synonyms
- Colostethus machalilla Coloma, 1995

= Epipedobates machalilla =

Species of amphibian

Epipedobates machalilla is a slender species of frog in the family Dendrobatidae. Endemic to West Ecuador, it lives in dry and low forests and was first described by Luis A. Coloma in 1995. The IUCN have classed it as "least concern".

== Description ==
Epipedobates machalilla has a snout–vent length of 14.4 to 16 millimetres (0.57 to 0.63 in) for males and 15.0 to 17.6 millimetres (0.59 to 0.69 in) for females. Their heads are longer than they are wide, and the tympanum is small. The forelimbs have a moderate length and the fingers are unwebbed. The toes do not have lateral fringes and the terminal discs are expanded. The skin of the dorsum is dark-coffee in colour with a cream-yellow or cream-white stripe that shows some pink coloration toward the posterior. The upper surfaces of the hind legs are light brown in color; the forelegs are orange. The frog has a gold iris and cream ventral surfaces.

== Biology ==
The mating system of the Epipedobates machalilla includes cephalic amplexus. The female will produce around 15 eggs which are left on the ground or under leaves. The female will then leave, and the male will protect the development of the embryos and carry the larvae. When the tadpoles hatch (around 20 days after fertilization occurs), the male will take the tadpoles to riverbanks or pools of water so metamorphosis and growth can take place. He displays aggressive behaviour to protect the tadpoles.

This frog's eggs, approximately 1.6 mm in diameter, are the smallest and least pigmented of any in the genus.

Epipedobates machalilla is in the chemically defended genus Epipedobates and is one of the six species within this clade that possesses inconspicuous coloration (the ancestral state for Epipedobates). However, it is believed that with the high intra-specific phenotypic diversity observed within poison frogs and the role of diet in toxicity that there could be chemically defended E. machalilla populations.

== Distribution ==
Epipedobates machalilla is endemic to West Ecuador, where it lives in dry and low forests. It mainly occurs in Azogues, Bolívar, El Oro, Guayas, Los Rios and Manabí and has been seen in the Choco rainforest. The species occurs at altitudes between 10 and 515 metres (33 and 1,690 ft). Recently, the population has been declining due to agriculture and logging.

The frog's range includes at least three protected parks: Parque Nacional Machalilla, Reserva Jouneche, Reserva Ecológica Manglares Churute.
