= 6-Methylnicotine =

Nicotine analogue and trace alkaloid

Names
- IUPAC name 2-Methyl-5-[(2S)-1-methylpyrrolidin-2-yl]pyridine
- Other names 6-MN

Identifiers
| CAS Number | racemic: 101540-79-8; (S) enantiomer: 13270-56-9 |
| 3D model (JSmol) | racemic: Interactive image; (S) enantiomer: Interactive image |
| ChemSpider | (S) enantiomer: 32814752 |
| EC Number | (S) enantiomer: 899-314-6 |
| PubChem CID | (S) enantiomer: 25768196 |
| UNII | (S) enantiomer: PEG8AGZ97W |
| CompTox Dashboard (EPA) | racemic: DTXSID20157722 |
- InChI: (S) enantiomer: InChI=1S/C11H16N2/c1-9-5-6-10(8-12-9)11-4-3-7-13(11)2/h5-6,8,11H,3-4,7H2,1-2H3/t11-/m0/s1 Key: SWNIAVIKMKSDBJ-NSHDSACASA-N
- SMILES: racemic: CC1=NC=C(C=C1)C2CCCN2C; (S) enantiomer: CC1=NC=C(C=C1)[C@@H]2CCCN2C

Properties
| Chemical formula | C_{11}H_{16}N_{2} |
| Molar mass | 176.263 g·mol^{−1} |
- Except where otherwise noted, data are given for materials in their standard state (at 25 °C [77 °F], 100 kPa). Infobox references

6-Methylnicotine (6-MN) is a nicotine analogue in which a methyl group is added at the 6-position of the pyridine ring. It has been identified in certain electronic cigarettes and oral pouch products marketed as nicotine alternatives, sometimes under the trade names Metatine (in disposables) and Nixodine-S (sold as a benzoate salt or free base). Studies in cells, animal models, and early human biomonitoring indicate higher activity at nicotinic acetylcholine receptors and differences in toxicity and metabolism compared with nicotine.

Although sometimes marketed as "not made or derived from tobacco", a 2025 analytical study reported trace natural occurrence of 6-MN in tobacco at a mean of 0.32 micrograms per gram (μg/g) and detected low-μg/mL levels in some previously analysed high-nicotine e-liquids, complicating origin-based regulatory claims.

== History ==
Reports of nicotine analogues date to the early 1960s. In 1963, Erdtman, Haglid and Wellings described synthetic analogues of nicotine, establishing early approaches to ring- and side-chain modification of the alkaloid.

In 1967, Haglid demonstrated that treatment of nicotine with methyllithium furnished multiple methylnicotine isomers, including 6-methylnicotine; the study detailed conditions and product distributions.

Industry-affiliated work expanded these routes in the early 1980s. A 1981 communication showed that methylmagnesium bromide addition to nicotine N-oxide provided both 2- and 6-methylnicotine, and that methyllithium could favor 2-substitution under certain conditions. A 1983 full paper from the Philip Morris U.S.A. Research Center (Richmond, Virginia) mapped reaction pathways and racemization behaviour for organometallic methylations of nicotine and nicotine N-oxide, reporting formation of 2-, 4- and 6-methylnicotines under varied conditions.

Through the 1990s, academic structure–activity studies reported higher receptor affinity and/or functional potency for several 6-substituted nicotine analogues compared with nicotine in rodent and membrane assays.

In late 2023, U.S. disposable e-cigarettes delivering 6-methylnicotine appeared under the trademark "Metatine", advertised as "PMTA-exempt". Subsequent analyses in 2024–2025 described additional U.S. products, identification of 6-methylnicotine in Australia, and oral pouches in Europe, as well as a 2025 report of trace natural occurrence of 6-methylnicotine in cured tobacco and several tobacco products.

== Chemistry ==
6-MN is the methyl homologue of nicotine with substitution at the 6-position of the pyridine ring. The (S) enantiomer is the biologically more active form at central α4β2 nicotinic acetylcholine receptors, analogous to (S)-nicotine.

== Pharmacology ==
Rodent and in-vitro binding studies indicate that methyl substitution at the 6-position can increase affinity and functional potency at nAChRs compared with nicotine. Analyses of U.S. products in 2024 reported commercial liquids labelled as containing 6-MN used the (S)-enantiomer exclusively. A 2025 metabolism study in mice and in human urine after product use identified multiple 6-MN metabolites (e.g., 6-methylcotinine, 6-methyl-3′-hydroxycotinine) and a shift toward N-oxidation relative to nicotine.

== Toxicology ==
Cell and animal studies report greater cytotoxicity or distinct toxic effects for 6-MN compared with nicotine. In human bronchial epithelial cells, 6-MN-containing e-liquids generated more reactive oxygen species (ROS) in aerosols and induced higher cytotoxicity across tested doses. An earlier in-vitro study likewise found higher cytotoxicity and broader transcriptomic disruption for 6-MN relative to nicotine in BEAS-2B cells. In vivo, mice exposed to 6-MN exhibited acute neurotoxic signs not observed with an equimolar dose of nicotine within the same study framework.

== Occurrence ==
A 2025 analytical survey reported average levels of 0.32 μg/g 6-MN in cured tobacco and several tobacco products; re-analysis of archived chromatograms from nine high-nicotine e-liquids (purchased 2018–2022) showed 6-MN at a mean 6.3 ± 1.4 μg/mL.

== Presence in consumer products ==
Commercial branding associated with 6-methylnicotine has included Metatine (disposable e-cigarettes in the United States), Nixodine-S (supplier listing), and Imotine (described as a benzoate salt by ingredient suppliers). Independent analyses of nicotine-analogue flavoured e-liquids, sold under various names, reported undeclared 6-methylnicotine alongside under-labelled nicotinamide, which has no known nicotinic receptor agonist activity, raising concerns about product transparency.

In 2023–2024, U.S. disposable e-cigarettes marketed with 6-MN (as "Metatine") were analysed by academic laboratories. Across nine flavours labelled "5% 6-MN", measured concentrations were approximately 0.58–0.63% (87–88% lower than labelled); neotame (sweetener) and WS-23 (coolant) were also detected. Outside the United States, 6-MN has been identified in some e-liquids sold in Australia in 2024 and in oral pouches marketed in Europe as "tobacco- and nicotine-free", with some products containing up to 20 mg 6-MN per pouch.

== Regulation ==
In the United States, a 2022 statutory update brought products "containing nicotine from any source" under FDA tobacco authority; chemical analogues such as 6-MN are not explicitly named, and federal agencies have noted potency concerns while reviewing available data. In the Netherlands, the National Institute for Public Health and the Environment (RIVM) derived advisory emission values for nicotine and 6-MN in non-tobacco products (0.028 mg nicotine and 0.0030 mg 6-MN per product at the lowest recommended level). In Australia, the Therapeutic Goods Administration (TGA) initiated consultation in 2025 on creating a Schedule 7 (Dangerous Poison) entry for 6-methylnicotine.

== See also ==
- Tobacco control
- 6-Chloronicotine
