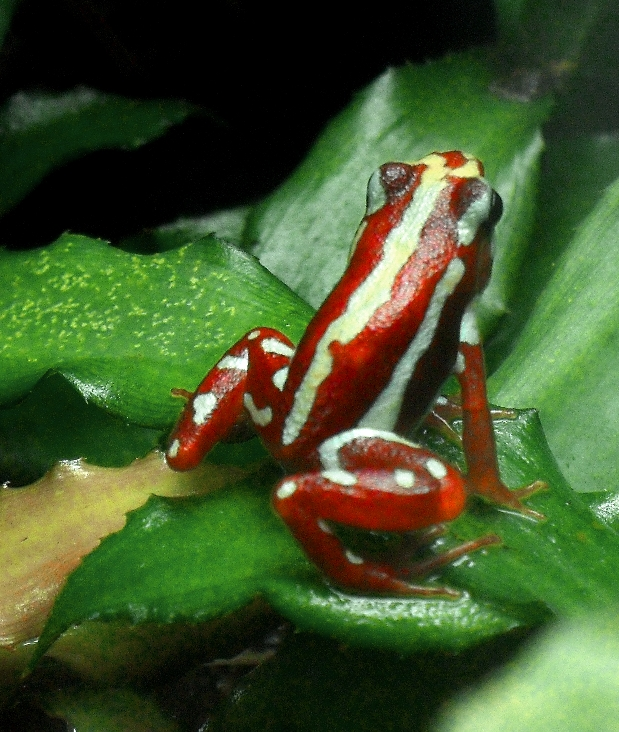
- Epipedobates anthonyi, in the Leipzig Botanical Garden, Germany

Conservation status
- Near Threatened (IUCN 3.1)

Scientific classification
- Kingdom: Animalia
- Phylum: Chordata
- Class: Amphibia
- Order: Anura
- Family: Dendrobatidae
- Genus: Epipedobates
- Species: E. anthonyi

Binomial name
- Epipedobates anthonyi (Noble, 1921)

Synonyms
- Phyllobates anthonyi Noble, 1921; Colostethus anthonyi (Noble, 1921); Phyllobates anthonyi (Noble, 1921); Dendrobates anthonyi (Noble, 1921); Ameerega anthonyi (Noble, 1921)

= Anthony's poison arrow frog =

Species of amphibian

Anthony's poison arrow frog (Epipedobates anthonyi), also known as Anthony's poison dart frog, is a species of poison dart frog in the family Dendrobatidae. The species is endemic to Ecuador and Peru.

== Etymology ==
The specific name, anthonyi, is in honor of American mammalogist Harold Elmer Anthony (1890–1970), who was Curator of Mammals at the American Museum of Natural History.

== Description ==
Anthony's poison arrow frog has a snout-to-vent length of about 19 to 26 mm (0.7 to 1.0 in). The hind legs are short and robust. The dorsal surface is usually dark red or brown and there are several yellowish-white oblique stripes and a central longitudinal stripe. Young froglets that have just completed metamorphosis are 11 mm long in snout–vent length.

== Geographic range ==
Anthony's poison arrow frog is known only from a number of locations in southwestern Ecuador and northwestern Peru at heights of between 153 and 1,769 m (502 and 5,804 ft) above sea level.

== Habitat ==
The natural habitat of E. anthonyi is the leaf litter on the floor of tropical dry forests, especially near streams. It has also been found in some modified habitats, such as near roads, on banana and cacao farms.

== Biology ==
Anthony's poison arrow frog is diurnal and terrestrial. Males are territorial. A clutch of 15 to 40 eggs is laid on the ground among leaf litter, and the male guards them till they hatch in about two weeks. He then carries the tadpoles on his back to a suitable water body where they develop (through metamorphosis) into frogs in about sixty days. Epibatidine, an extremely toxic nicotine-like substance, was first derived from and named for Epipedobates anthonyi. Once investigated for possible use as an analgesic agent, the alkaloid proved far too toxic for any application in human medicine and is presently used exclusively for research purposes. Scientists infer that the frog acquires the alkaloids through its diet because frogs collected from different types of habitats showed different levels of toxin, and frogs raised in captivity had none.

== Status ==
Anthony's poison arrow frog is listed as "Near Threatened" by the IUCN and the government of Peru. Institutions in Ecuador classify it as "Least Concern". Its population seems stable but it has a limited range, estimated to be less than 20,000 square kilometres (7,700 sq mi), and its habitat is being degraded by pollution from agrochemicals. It is also collected for medicinal use. There is some collection for the international pet trade, but scientists do not know if this poses a threat to the species' survival.
