= ABT-418 =

Chemical compound

Identifiers
- IUPAC name: 3-Methyl-5-[(2S)-1-methylpyrrolidin-2-yl]-1,2-oxazole
- CAS Number: 147402-53-7
- PubChem CID: 119380
- ChemSpider: 106627
- UNII: B9I6MZL7BW
- ChEMBL: ChEMBL274525
- CompTox Dashboard (EPA): DTXSID10163711

Chemical and physical data
- Formula: C_{9}H_{14}N_{2}O
- Molar mass: 166.224 g·mol^{−1}
- 3D model (JSmol): Interactive image
- SMILES: CC1=NOC(=C1)[C@@H]2CCCN2C
- InChI: InChI=1S/C9H14N2O/c1-7-6-9(12-10-7)8-4-3-5-11(8)2/h6,8H,3-5H2,1-2H3/t8-/m0/s1; Key:ILLGYRJAYAAAEW-QMMMGPOBSA-N

ABT-418 is a drug developed by Abbott, that has nootropic, neuroprotective and anxiolytic effects, and has been researched for treatment of both Alzheimer's disease and ADHD. It acts as an agonist at neural nicotinic acetylcholine receptors, subtype-selective binding with high affinity to the α_{4}β_{2}, α_{7}/5-HT_{3}, and α_{2}β_{2} nicotinic acetylcholine receptors but not α3β4 receptors ABT-418 was reasonably effective for both applications and fairly well tolerated, but produced some side effects, principally nausea, and it is unclear whether ABT-418 itself will proceed to clinical development or if another similar drug will be used instead.

== See also ==
- Epiboxidine
- Anabaseine
