= Pozanicline =

Synthetic nootropic drug

Identifiers
- IUPAC name: 2-Methyl-3-{[(2S)-pyrrolidin-2-yl]methoxy}pyridine
- CAS Number: 161417-03-4
- PubChem CID: 178052
- ChemSpider: 155000
- UNII: CL2002R563
- CompTox Dashboard (EPA): DTXSID20167149

Chemical and physical data
- Formula: C_{11}H_{16}N_{2}O
- Molar mass: 192.262 g·mol^{−1}
- 3D model (JSmol): Interactive image
- SMILES: CC1=C(C=CC=N1)OC[C@@H]2CCCN2
- InChI: InChI=1S/C11H16N2O/c1-9-11(5-3-6-12-9)14-8-10-4-2-7-13-10/h3,5-6,10,13H,2,4,7-8H2,1H3/t10-/m0/s1; Key:YRVIKLBSVVNSHF-JTQLQIEISA-N

Pozanicline (INN, codenamed ABT-089) is a drug developed by Abbott, that has nootropic and neuroprotective effects. Animal studies suggested it useful for the treatment of ADHD and subsequent human trials have shown ABT-089 to be effective for this application. It binds with high affinity subtype-selective to the α_{4}β_{2} nicotinic acetylcholine receptors and has partial agonism to the α_{6}β_{2} subtype, but not the α_{7} and α_{3}β_{4} subtypes familiar to nicotine. It has particularly low tendency to cause side effects compared to other drugs in the class.

== Synthesis ==
Pozanicline is synthesized from 2-methyl-3-hydroxypyridine and Boc-L-Prolinol through a dehydration reaction followed by deprotection of the nitrogen atom of prolinol.

== See also ==
- List of investigational ADHD drugs
- List of investigational antipsychotics
- List of investigational cognition and memory disorder drugs
