= Para-Methylphenylpiperazine =

para-Methylphenylpiperazine

Clinical data
- Other names: pMPP; 4-Methylphenylpiperazine; 4-MPP; 4-Me-PP; PAL-233; PAL233
- Drug class: Serotonin releasing agent

Identifiers
- IUPAC name: 1-(4-methylphenyl)piperazine
- CAS Number: 39593-08-3
- PubChem CID: 83113
- ChemSpider: 74982
- UNII: 78DG9CN7ZM
- ChEMBL: ChEMBL165462
- CompTox Dashboard (EPA): DTXSID90192706
- ECHA InfoCard: 100.049.559

Chemical and physical data
- Formula: C_{11}H_{16}N_{2}
- Molar mass: 176.263 g·mol^{−1}
- 3D model (JSmol): Interactive image
- SMILES: CC1=CC=C(C=C1)N2CCNCC2
- InChI: InChI=1S/C11H16N2/c1-10-2-4-11(5-3-10)13-8-6-12-7-9-13/h2-5,12H,6-9H2,1H3; Key:ONEYFZXGNFNRJH-UHFFFAOYSA-N

para-Methylphenylpiperazine (pMPP; code name PAL-233), or 4-methylphenylpiperazine (4-MPP or 4-Me-PP), is a designer drug and monoamine releasing agent of the phenylpiperazine family. It is a serotonin releasing agent, with an EC_{50} of 220 nM in rat brain synaptosomes, and was inactive in the case of norepinephrine and dopamine (EC_{50} = >10,000 nM and >20,000 nM, respectively). It shows very low potency as a dopamine reuptake inhibitor, with an IC_{50} of 9,523 nM, whereas serotonin and norepinephrine were not reported. Possible activities at serotonin receptors have not been reported.
