= Alpha-3 beta-2 nicotinic receptor =

Type of human nicotinic acetylcholine receptor

The alpha-3 beta-2 nicotinic receptor, also known as the α3β2 receptor, is a type of nicotinic acetylcholine receptor, consisting of α3 and β2 subunits.

It occurs alongside the more common α3β4 nicotinic receptor in autonomic ganglia, and as an facilitatory presynaptic autoreceptor at the neuromuscular junction (NMJ). At the NMJ, it is involved in upregulation of ACh release during high-frequency stimulation. Nicotine, a component of tobacco and the namesake agonist of the receptor, has been found to increase its concentration. Blockage of this receptor in the presence of a partial postsynaptic neuromuscular block is thought to produce the characteristic tetanic fade caused by non-depolarizing neuromuscular blockers.

The receptor is classified as an allosteric enzyme that is generally activated by the natural agonist acetylcholine, however it may also be activated by external agonists such as nicotine and blocked by toxins such as bungarus toxin 3.1. The main role of the receptor is to allow the reuptake of the neurotransmitter acetylcholine. Because it is a receptor involved in mechanisms including the neurotransmitter acetylcholine it is synthesized in the brain. However, α3β2 receptors synthesized in different locations of the brain may have differing regulatory properties. This is due to the cytoplasmic region in which the receptor is being formulated. Even though, there have been theories, how the increase in the receptors and uptaking of acetylcholine because of smoking nicotine can cause schizophrenia, no real correlation has been deducted.

== Ligands ==
=== Agonists ===
- Acetylcholine
- Cytisine
- DMPP
- Epibatidine
- Nicotine
- Suberyldicholine
- UB-165
- Varenicline

=== PAMs ===
- Levamisole
- Morantel

=== Antagonists ===
- Bupropion
- DHβE
- Mecamylamine
- Memantine
- Methyllycaconitine
- PelA-5466, very selective, 300 fold more potent on α3β2 than α6/α3β2β3
- Tubocurarine

== See also ==
- α3β4-Nicotinic receptor
- α4β2-Nicotinic receptor
- α7-Nicotinic receptor
