= CHRNA5 =

Nicotinic receptor involved in pain regulation

Identifiers
- Aliases: CHRNA5, LNCR2, cholinergic receptor nicotinic alpha 5 subunit
- External IDs: OMIM: 118505; MGI: 87889; GeneCards: CHRNA5

Gene location (Human)
Chr.	Chromosome 15 (human)
Band	15q25.1	Start	78,565,520 bp
Band	15q25.1	End	78,595,269 bp

Gene location (Mouse)
Chr.	Chromosome 9 (mouse)
Band	9 B|9 29.84 cM	Start	54,888,164 bp
Band	9 B|9 29.84 cM	End	54,915,063 bp
RNA expression pattern
Bgee	Human / Mouse (ortholog); Top expressed in: ventricular zone; ganglionic eminence; gonad; testicle; islet of Langerhans; secondary oocyte; gallbladder; rectum; mucosa of transverse colon; stromal cell of endometrium / Top expressed in: spermatid; ganglion of vagus nerve; substantia nigra; seminiferous tubule; gray matter layer of cerebellum; embryo; morula; embryo; zygote; spermatocyte; More reference expression data
BioGPS	More reference expression data
Gene ontology
Molecular function	acetylcholine receptor activity; ion channel activity; protein binding; ligand-gated ion channel activity; extracellular ligand-gated ion channel activity; acetylcholine binding; acetylcholine-gated cation-selective channel activity; transmembrane signaling receptor activity
Cellular component	integral component of membrane; acetylcholine-gated channel complex; postsynaptic membrane; membrane; plasma membrane; synapse; cell junction; dopaminergic synapse; integral component of plasma membrane; neuron projection
Biological process	response to nicotine; synaptic transmission, cholinergic; ion transport; behavioral response to nicotine; neuromuscular synaptic transmission; signal transduction; chemical synaptic transmission; regulation of postsynaptic membrane potential; excitatory postsynaptic potential; ion transmembrane transport; regulation of synaptic vesicle exocytosis; regulation of membrane potential; nervous system process
Sources:Amigo / QuickGO
Orthologs
Databases	NCBI: entry; OMA: entry
Species	Human	Mouse
Entrez	1138	110835
Ensembl	ENSG00000169684	ENSMUSG00000035594
UniProt	P30532	Q2MKA5
RefSeq (mRNA)	NM_000745; NM_001307945	NM_176844; NM_001373901; NM_001373902
RefSeq (protein)	NP_000736; NP_001294874	NP_789814; NP_001360830; NP_001360831
Location (UCSC)	Chr 15: 78.57 – 78.6 Mb	Chr 9: 54.89 – 54.92 Mb
PubMed search
- Wikidata
View/Edit Human	View/Edit Mouse

Neuronal acetylcholine receptor subunit alpha-5 (or α5 nAChR) is a protein that in humans is encoded by the CHRNA5 gene. This protein is a type of ligand gated neuronal type subunit of the nicotinic acetylcholine receptor involved in pain regulation.

== Overview ==
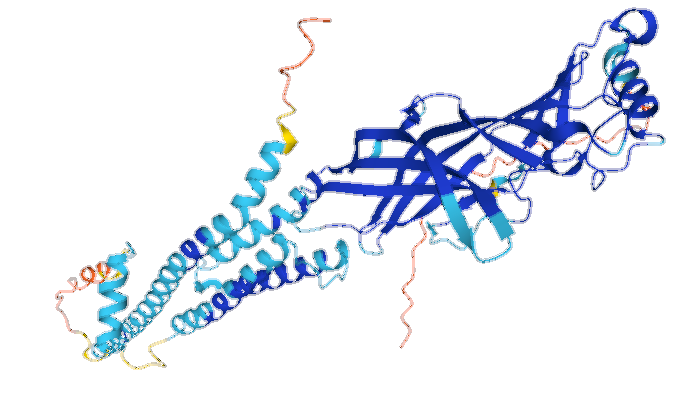
Alpha5 nicotinic acetylcholine 3D structure

There are two major classes of acetylcholine receptors: nicotinic receptors, which bind to exogenous nicotine, and muscarinic receptors, which bind exogenous muscarine. Nicotinic acetylcholine receptors (nAChRs) were initially discovered through the application and binding of nicotine, however, endogenous acetylcholine is the ligand that binds under normal physiological conditions. The nAChRs are single channel ionotropic receptors found throughout the brain and body that allow for cations to flow in and out of cells. These receptors consist of five transmembrane subunits with the α5 nAChR defined by the presence of the α5 subunit. The α5 nAChR is located in various areas of the brain including the cortex, hippocampus, hypothalamus, inferior colliculus, medial habenula, olfactory bulb and striatum. The α5 nAChR is involved in modulating chronic inflammation and peripheral nerve injury. Acetylcholine binds in the cortex, hippocampus, hypothalamus, inferior colliculus, striatum and olfactory bulb. CHRNA5 is located in a gene cluster on chromosome 15q24 along with CHRNA3 and CHRNB4. Homopentameric receptors with five acetylcholine binding sites contain two a-subunits (a2-a4 or a6) and two non-a-subunits (B2 or B4). Alpha5 subunits tend to be the fifth that does not directly bind to acetylcholine and act as auxiliary subunits. Rather, they may be important for receptor targeting and localization on the cell membrane. The alpha subunits normally assemble into both alpha3B4-containing and alpha4-beta2 containing nAChR assemblies. These receptors have been found on dopaminergic neurons in the rodent striatum and are involved in DA release upon nicotine stimulation. In addition to DA neurons, alpha5 subunits are also expressed on GABAergic neurons in the VTA and striatum.

== Development ==
The alpha5 subunit is important during the development and maturation of prefrontal pyramidal IV neurons. Cholinergic dysfunction during development causes attentional deficits observed in diseases such as schizophrenia, neurodevelopmental disorders, autism and epilepsy. Most cholinergic neurons are developed by the perinatal period in humans. Maturational changes that occur in dendrites during development are absent in alpha5 -/- mice indicating that the alpha5 subunit is necessary for proper maturation of prefrontal pyramidal cells.

== Nicotine addiction and withdrawal ==
Addiction to nicotine is modulated by the mesocorticolimbic dopamine reward system that drives the rewarding nature of nicotine; the mesocorticolimbic system is involved in self-stimulation and processing an environmental reward. For example, this system is active while consuming highly caloric food or while gambling. Upon the administration of nicotine, there is increased firing rate mediated by midbrain dopamine neurons within this system. Through continuous exposure, dependence often occurs which is followed by withdrawal symptoms such as cravings, irritation, restlessness, sleep disturbances, weight gain, anxiety and difficulty concentrating. Subunits involved with withdrawal syndrome include α5, α2, and B4 within the epithalamic habenular complex and its projections. The medial habenula (MHb) and its projection to the interpeduncular nucleus (IPN) contain dense expression of α5 nAChR subunits.

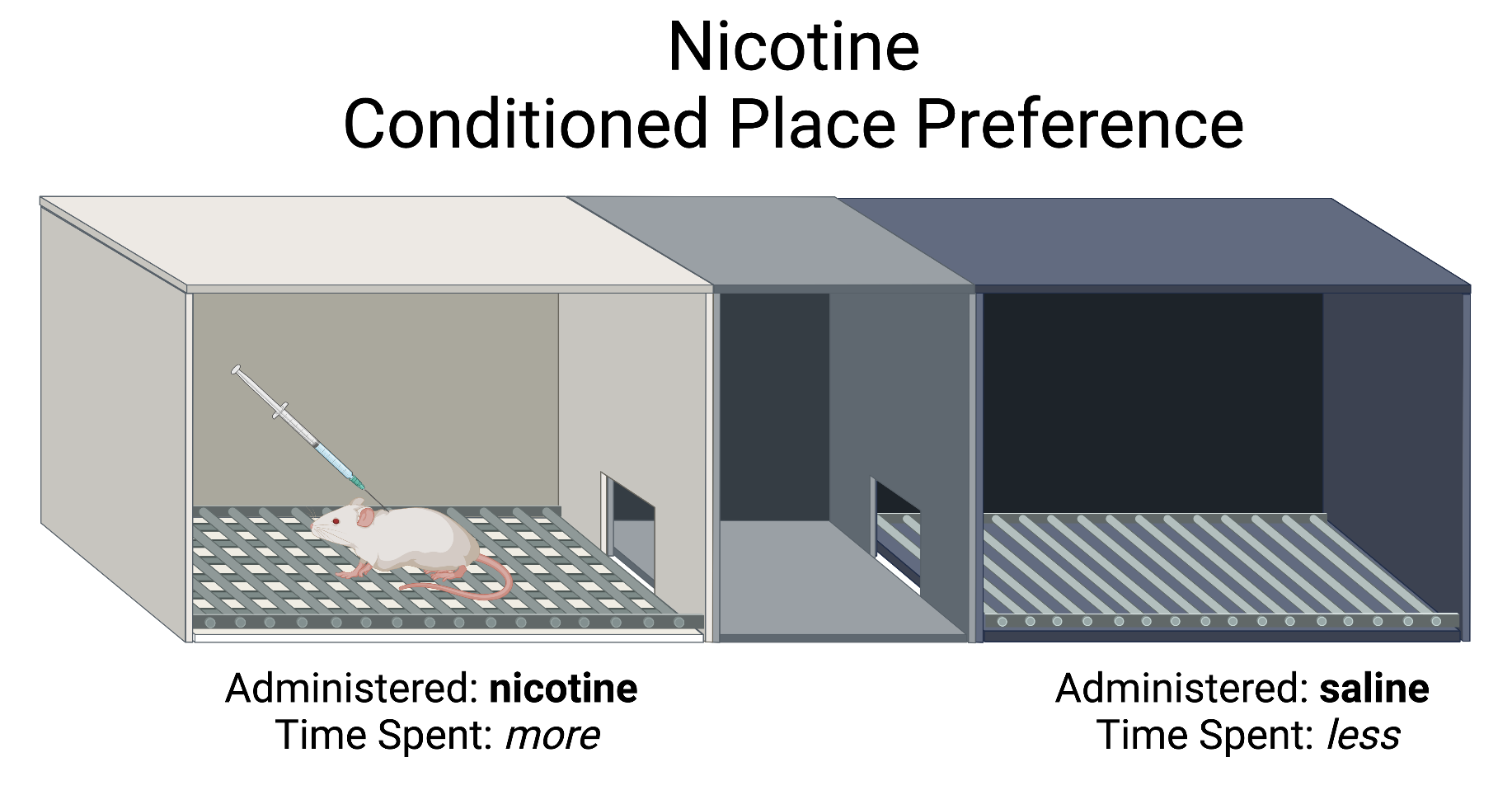
Conditioned place preference experiment designed on Biorender.com

=== In vivo studies ===
Studies have shown that removing the α5 nAChR subunits from mice (α5 nAChR null) will make them less sensitive to acute effects of nicotine. The mice showed decreased locomotion in an open field test and fewer nicotine-induced seizures. Other studies have shown that α5 nAChR null mice display fewer signs of dependency and reduced anxiety-like behaviors. Because the knockout mice show less aversion to increased nicotine intake, they tend to self-administer at much higher doses than wildtype mice. However, reintroduction of the alpha 5 subunit in the medial habenula in knockout mice restored normal levels of nicotine self-administration. This demonstrates that the expression of the alpha5 subunit in the medial habenula is sufficient to reinstate nicotine aversion. In contrast, the targeted knockdown of α5 subunits in the habenulo-interpeduncular pathway in wildtype mice did not change the stimulatory effects observed in knockout mice demonstrating that the subunit is not necessary for nicotine aversion, and that other areas of the brain can compensate for this behavior.

In a conditioned place preference study (CPP), researchers trained mice to associate nicotine administration with one chamber and saline administration in an adjacent chamber. At low doses of nicotine, alpha5 knockout mice and wildtype mice both showed preference for the nicotine chamber. However, at high doses of nicotine, only the α5 knockout mice preferred the nicotine chamber demonstrating that the alpha5 knockout mice still experienced the rewarding aspects of nicotine, but not the normal aversive behaviors with nicotine overdose.

Studies from Tuesta et al. 2011 have shown that the dose-response curve is similar when comparing knockout mice to wildtype mice however the knockout mice consumed greater amounts of nicotine which resulted in the descending portion of the dose-response curve to descend declined slower in the knockout mice. There has been shown an increased response to nicotine in the ascending portion of the curve demonstrating the greater rewarding properties.

=== Human studies ===
Nicotine is commonly consumed by people for its rewarding properties resulting in dependence, addiction and withdrawal. Human studies have shown that people with a single nucleotide polymorphism (SNP) within the α5 nAChR encoding gene (CHRNA5, rs16969968) correlates with an increased risk of nicotine dependency and pleasure along with more heavy smoking. This particular SNP results in an aspartic acid to asparagine substitution at amino acid residue 398 (D398N). The rs16969968 within CHRNA5 causes a reduction in the receptor function that is involved in producing withdrawal symptoms. Individuals with this SNP are commonly found in those of European descent; there is about a 30% greater risk of nicotine dependence in individuals carry a single copy of the variant and about a 50% greater risk in individuals with two copies. Other studies have shown that people with this SNP develop nicotine dependence at a younger age. Researchers conclude that fewer aversive effects of nicotine would promote the rewarding effects or hedonic drive that would transition people from nicotine abuse to dependency. Additionally, SNP variants within rs16969968 in CHRNA5 have been associated with smoking-related behaviors such has a higher prevalence of smokers vs nonsmokers.

== Attention and cognition ==
Attention is an important aspect of memory that allows for information to be held in the mind and maintain focus in the presence of distractions in order to achieve a goal directed behavior. Working memory is a similar aspect of learning, however, the main difference between the two is that working memory requires the mental manipulation of information as well. The structure most commonly associated with attention is the prefrontal cortex that mediates top down control of complex cognitive processes. Acetylcholine is a neuromodulator that is closely studied for its role in learning and memory; it is involved in the acquisition, consolidation and recall.

=== In vivo studies ===
Researchers speculate that layer VI pyramidal neurons in the prefrontal cortex are important for holding attention in cognitively demanding tasks. These neurons send feedback projections to the thalamus and are highly responsive to acetylcholine. In vivo studies have shown that the presence of alpha5 subunits of nAChRs on layer VI pyramidal neurons in the PFC are important for visual attention. In slice electrophysiology experiments, researchers have shown that alpha5 subunits enhance currents in the PFC of an adult mouse. In vivo, researchers use a five-choice serial reaction task. The animals are randomly given 1 of 5 light stimulus, and they need to encode and recall the location of the stimulus in order to receive a reward. Transgenic mice without the gene that encodes alpha5 subunits showed impaired performance on the five-choice serial reaction task. This indicates that the alpha5 null mice have attentional deficits. Interestingly, the deletion of alpha5 subunits in mice results in an upregulation of muscarinic acetylcholine receptors as an excitatory compensation response to circuitry dysfunction. Because of the cognitive enhancing effects of alpha5 nAChR agonists, it is a common target for neurodegenerative disorders with cognitive deficits along with ADHD.

=== Human studies ===
Due to technical limitations of invasive procedures, there are far fewer studies in about the role of the alpha5 nAChR subunit and cognition. Studies have performed microdialysis in subjects as they formed attention tasks and found significantly increased acetylcholine efflux.

== Clinical application ==
The α5 nAChR mediates acute effects of alcohol; a deletion in this gene affects alcohol intake under stressful conditions. The α5 nAChR also mediates short term effects of nicotine. Studies have shown that removing the alpha5 subunit in mice (α5 nAChR knockdown) increases nicotine intake which is rescued by reintroducing the gene. Researchers have also shown that removing the α5 subunit only in the medial habenula increases nicotine self-administration, demonstrating that this subunit is necessary for normal nicotine intake and abnormalities within this subunit may contribute to the addictive properties of nicotine. Additionally, the alpha5 nAChR subunit is associated with other forms of addiction such as cocaine. Other studies have shown that α5 knockout mice shown impaired attentional performance. During high frequency vagal stimulation, α5 nAChR knockout mice experience impaired cardiac parasympathetic ganglionic transmission. In vivo studies have also identified the alpha5 nAChR as a possible treatment for chronic inflammation and neuropathic pain.

== Ligands ==
Ligand	Structure	Function	Use
Acetylcholine		Agonist	Endogenous
Nicotine		Agonist	Recreational drug Attention
Pozanicline		Partial agonist	Experimental drug for ADHD, Alzheimer's disease, and tobacco use disorder
α-Conotoxin MII		Antagonist	
α-Conotoxin PnIA		Antagonist	
α-Conotoxin GIC		Antagonist	
α-Conotoxin TXIA		Antagonist	

== Interactive pathway map ==
Click on genes, proteins and metabolites below to link to respective articles. (Note: The interactive pathway map can be edited at WikiPathways: "NicotineDopaminergic_WP1602".)

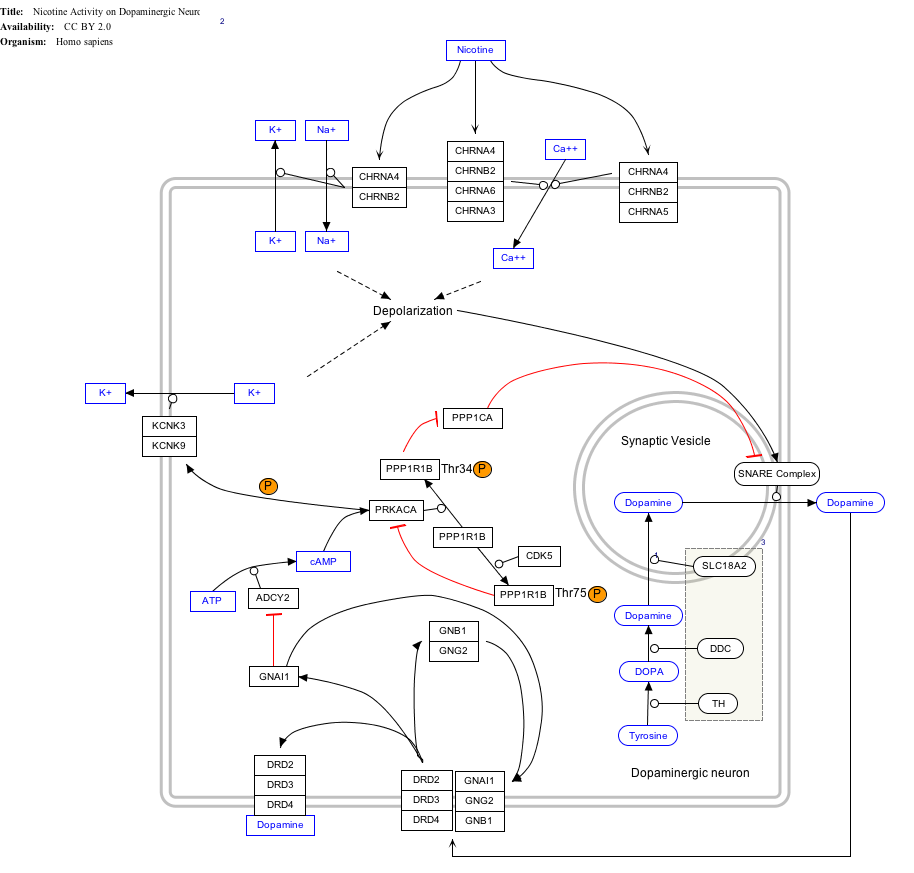

Nicotine Activity on Dopaminergic Neurons edit
