= Alpha-3 beta-4 nicotinic receptor =

Type of nicotinic acetylcholine receptor

The alpha-3 beta-4 nicotinic receptor, also known as the α3β4 receptor and the ganglion-type nicotinic receptor, is a type of nicotinic acetylcholine receptor, consisting of α3 and β4 subunits. It is located in the autonomic ganglia and adrenal medulla, where activation yields post- and/or presynaptic excitation, mainly by increased Na^{+} and K^{+} permeability.

As with other nicotinic acetylcholine receptors, the α3β4 receptor is pentameric [(α3)_{m}(β4)_{n} where m + n = 5]. The exact subunit stoichiometry is not known and it is possible that more than one functional α3β4 receptor assembles in vivo with varying subunit stoichiometries.

Ligands which inhibit the α3β4 receptor have been shown to modulate drug-seeking behavior, making α3β4 a promising target for the development of novel antiaddictive agents.

== Ligands ==
=== Agonists ===
- Acetylcholine (endogenous neurotransmitter that binds non-selectively to nAChRs and mAChRs)
- Anabaseine and other structural analogs
- Carbachol
- Cytisine (partial agonist)
- Dimethylphenylpiperazinium
- Epibatidine
- Lobeline
- Nicotine
- RJR-2429

=== Antagonists ===
==== Competitive ====
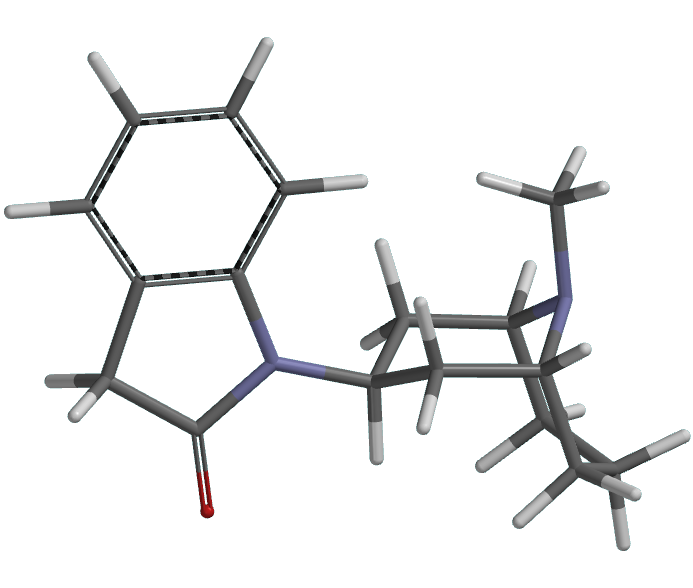
3d structure of "compound 5" (Zaveri 2010). K_{i}, 508 nM at α_{3}β_{4} nAChR

- DHβE
- SR 16584, highly selective over α4β2 and α7

==== Noncompetitive ====
- Dextromethorphan
- Dextrorphan
- Dextropropoxyphene
- Hexamethonium
- Imipramine
- Levacetylmethadol
- Mecamylamine
- Methadone
- Tubocurarine
- Bupropion
- Reboxetine
- Ibogaine
- Voacangine
- 18-MC
- 18-MAC
- ME-18-MC
- AT-1001
- Choline

== See also ==
- α3β2-Nicotinic receptor
- α4β2-Nicotinic receptor
- α7-Nicotinic receptor
- Muscle-type nicotinic receptor
