= Dorsal longitudinal fasciculus =

Nerve tract of the midbrain

Details

Identifiers
- Latin: fasciculus longitudinalis posterior, fasciculus longitudinalis dorsalis
- NeuroNames: 599
- NeuroLex ID: birnlex_986
- TA98: A14.1.05.305
- TA2: 5868
- FMA: 83845

The dorsal longitudinal fasciculus (DLF) is a distinctive nerve tract in the midbrain. It extends from the hypothalamus rostrally to the spinal cord caudally, and contains both descending and ascending fibers.

Descending fibers arise in the hypothalamus to project directly or indirectly onto autonomic nuclei and lower motor neurons of the brainstem and spinal cord; the descending component is involved in controlling chewing, swallowing, salivation and gastrointestinal secretory function, and shivering.

Among the ascending fibers is a serotonin pathway arising in the raphe nuclei.

== Anatomy ==
=== Ascending fibers ===
Fibres arising from the nuclei of the reticular formation ascend in the DLF to terminate in the hypothalamus. It conveys visceral information to the brain.

Fibers arising from the parabrachial area pass in the DLF to convey taste and general visceral sensation from the nucleus tractus solitarii to the posterior nucleus and periventricular nuclei of the hypothalamus.

A small ascending dorsal serotonergic pathway arising from the ventral and dorsal superior raphe nuclei initially travels in the DLF, with some of its fibres terminating in the periaqueductal gray of the midbrain, and the posterior hypothalamus; the majority of its fibers however pass beyond the DLF in the medial forebrain bundle, here uniting with fibres of the more substantial ventral serotonergic pathway to commonly terminate diffusely across structures of the forebrain.

=== Descending fibers ===
The descending fibers of the DLF commence in the medial zone of the hypothalamus as largely unmyelinated axons having originated from the paraventricular nucleus of hypothalamus. The axons converge to form a distinct bundle in the periaqueductal gray of the midbrain. Still more caudally, the DLF passes in the medial portion of the floor of the fourth ventricle.

Descending fibers of the DLF may first synapse in either the periaqueductal gray or reticular formation which in turn form relay projections onto the autonomic nuclei of the brainstem, and the lower motor neurons of the brainstem and spinal cord, respectively. Some fibers project directly to the dorsal nucleus of vagus nerve, and autonomic nuclei of the spinal cord (hypothalamospinal fibers).

Descending projections of the DLF are functionally involved in mediating chewing, swallowing, salivation and gastrointestinal secretory function, and shivering.

- Medial zone of hypothalamus → periaqueductal gray (synapse) → solitary nucleus, dorsal nucleus of vagus nerve.
- Hypothalamus → reticular formation (synapse) →
  - → reticulonuclear tract → lower motorneurons of the brainstem.
  - → reticulospinal tract → lower motor neuron of the spinal cord.
- Medial habenular nucleus → fasciculus retroflexus → interpeduncular nucleus of midbrain → midbrain reticular formation → dorsal longitudinal fasciculus → autonomic pre-ganglionic neurons. This pathway is involved in the autonomic regulation of mastication (chewing), deglutition (swallowing), and salivary and gastrointestinal secretory function.

The salivatory nuclei receive hypothalamic afferents which perhaps pass through the DLF.
