= 18-Methoxycoronaridine =

Chemical compound

18-Methoxycoronaridine INN: Zolunicant

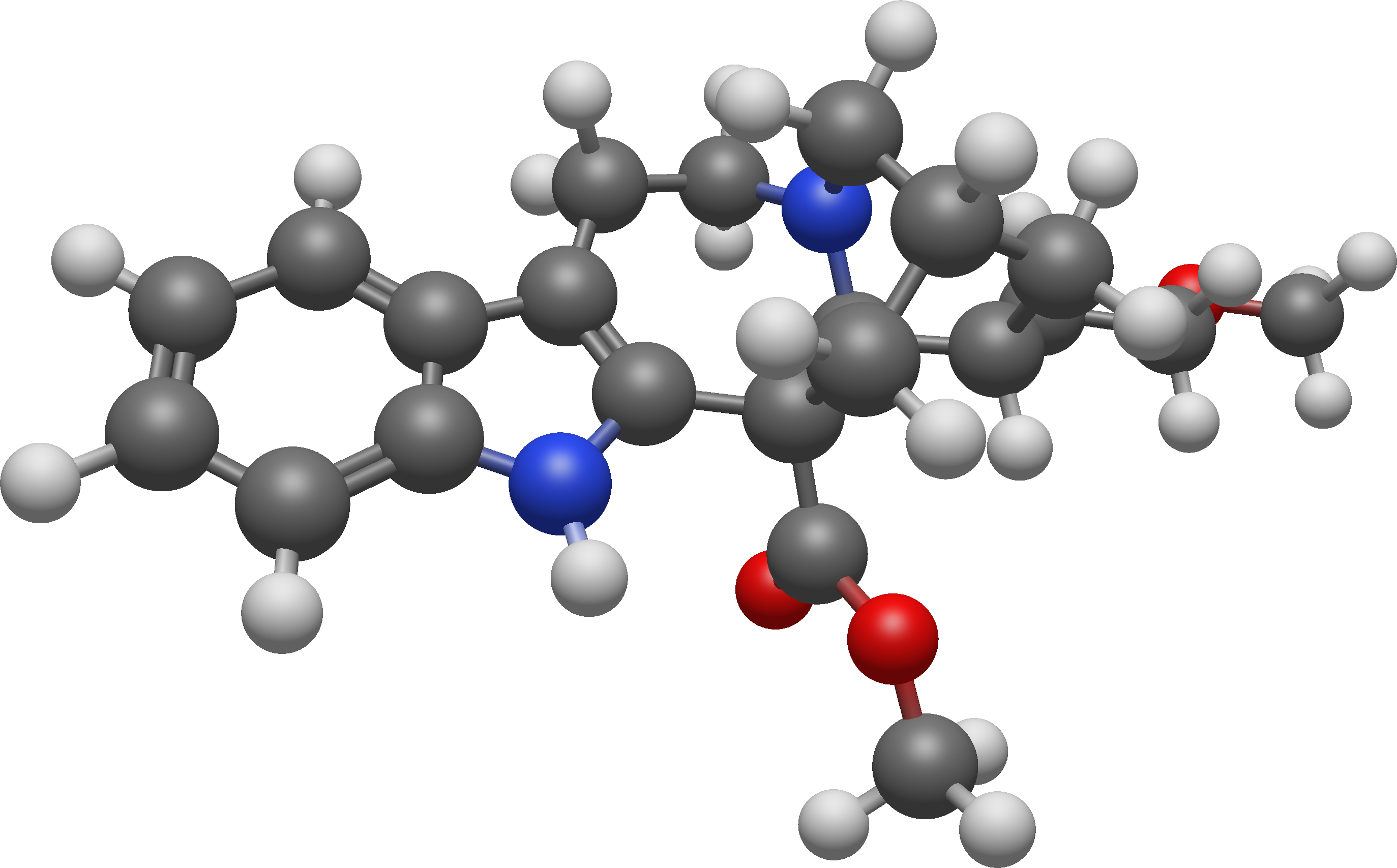

Clinical data
- Other names: 18-MC; Zolunicant; MM-110; MM110
- Routes of administration: Oral

Legal status
- Legal status: US: Investigational New Drug (filed 2/9/2014)

Identifiers
- IUPAC name: methyl (1S,15R,17R,18S)-17-(2-methoxyethyl)-3,13-diazapentacyclo[13.3.1.02,10.04,9.013,18]nonadeca-2(10),4,6,8-tetraene-1-carboxylate
- CAS Number: 308123-60-6; racemic: 188125-42-0
- PubChem CID: 10248465
- ChemSpider: 24721799
- UNII: KX8NQX91Z8; racemic: VG463BM9RL
- CompTox Dashboard (EPA): DTXSID40437331

Chemical and physical data
- Formula: C_{22}H_{28}N_{2}O_{3}
- Molar mass: 368.477 g·mol^{−1}
- 3D model (JSmol): Interactive image
- SMILES: COCC[C@H]1C[C@@H]2C[C@@]3([C@H]1N(C2)CCc4c3[nH]c5c4cccc5)C(=O)OC
- InChI: InChI=1S/C22H28N2O3/c1-26-10-8-15-11-14-12-22(21(25)27-2)19-17(7-9-24(13-14)20(15)22)16-5-3-4-6-18(16)23-19/h3-6,14-15,20,23H,7-13H2,1-2H3/t14-,15+,20+,22-/m1/s1; Key:DTJQBBHYRQYDEG-SVBQBFEESA-N

18-Methoxycoronaridine (18-MC; developmental code name MM-110), also known as zolunicant (INN), is a derivative of ibogaine invented in 1996 by the research team around the pharmacologist Stanley D. Glick from the Albany Medical College and the chemists Upul K. Bandarage and Martin E. Kuehne from the University of Vermont.

18-MC was originally developed by Savant HWP and later acquired by MindMed in 2019 for development as a treatment for opioid use disorder. A Phase 1 trial in healthy volunteers was completed in 2022 with favorable safety and tolerability. Due to strategic reprioritization, MindMed discontinued active development of MM-110 in 2023 and has been seeking non-dilutive funding or partners to potentially restart the program; as of 2025 the program remains shelved. A separate Phase 2 trial in Brazil for cutaneous leishmaniasis (initiated 2017) has unknown status with no published results.

== Pharmacology ==
18-MC is a α_{3}β_{4} nicotinic antagonist and, in contrast to ibogaine, has no affinity at the α_{4}β_{2} subtype nor at NMDA-channels nor at the serotonin transporter, and has significantly reduced affinity for sodium channels and for the σ receptor, but retains modest affinity for μ-opioid receptors where it acts as an agonist, and κ-opioid receptors. The sites of action in the brain include the medial habenula, interpeduncular nucleus, dorsolateral tegmentum and basolateral amygdala. (±)-18-MC competitively inhibits α9α10 nAChRs with potencies higher than that at α3β4 and α4β2 nAChRs and directly blocks Ca_{V}2.2.

== Chemistry ==
=== Derivatives ===
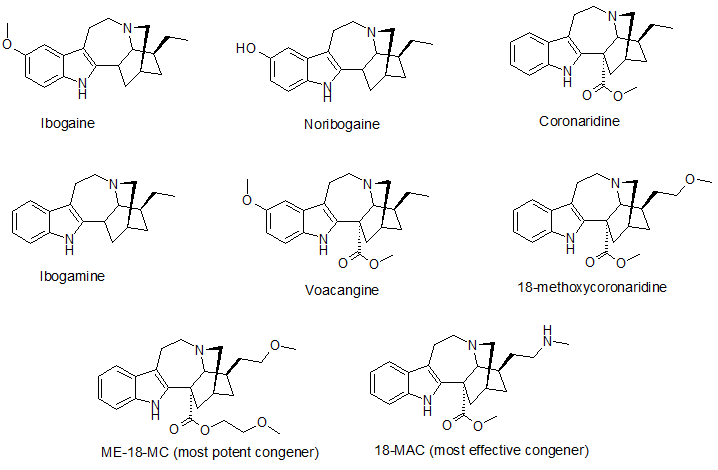
A number of derivatives of 18-MC have been developed, with several of them being superior to 18-MC itself, the methoxyethyl congener ME-18-MC being more potent than 18-MC with similar efficacy, and the methylamino analogue 18-MAC being more effective than 18-MC with around the same potency. These compounds were also found to act as selective α_{3}β_{4} nicotinic acetylcholine antagonists, with little or no effect on NMDA receptors.

== See also ==
- Coronaridine
- Ibogaine
- Noribogaine
- Voacangine
