= Habenular commissure =

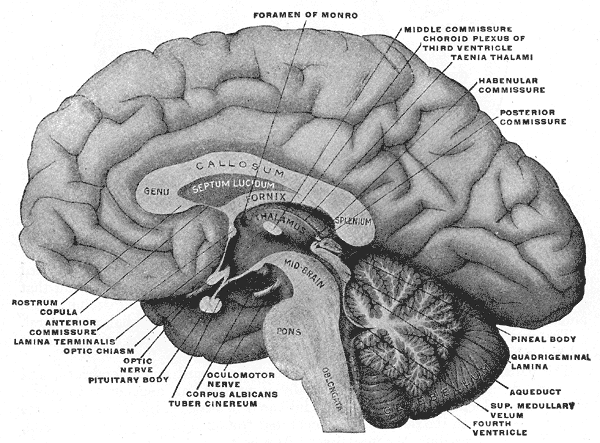
- Medial aspect of a brain sectioned in the median sagittal plane.

Details

Identifiers
- Latin: commissura habenularum
- NeuroNames: 299
- NeuroLex ID: birnlex_1609
- TA98: A14.1.08.414
- TA2: 5748
- TE: commissure_by_E5.14.3.4.2.1.6 E5.14.3.4.2.1.6
- FMA: 62048

The habenular commissure is a nerve tract of commissural fibers that connects the habenular nuclei on both sides of the habenular trigone in the epithalamus.

The habenular commissure is part of the habenular trigone (a small depressed triangular area situated in front of the superior colliculus and on the lateral aspect of the posterior part of the taenia thalami). The habenulum trigone also contains the habenular nuclei. Fibers enter the habenular trigone from the stalk of the pineal gland, and the habenular commissure. Most of the habenular trigone's fibers are, however, directed downward and form a bundle, the fasciculus retroflexus, which passes medial to the red nucleus, and, after decussating with the corresponding fasciculus of the opposite side, ends in the interpeduncular nucleus.
