= RJR (disambiguation) =

R. J. Reynolds Tobacco Company is an American tobacco company.

RJR may also refer to:

- RJR-MacDonald Inc v Canada (AG), a Supreme Court of Canada case involving the tobacco company
- RJR Nabisco, from which the tobacco company was split
- RJR-2429 a drug that acts as an agonist at neural nicotinic acetylcholine receptors
- RJR 94 FM, a broadcast company in Jamaica
- RJR Airdrome, Inc., owner of Chandelle Estates Airport in Delaware
