= UB-165 =

Pharmaceutical drug

Identifiers
- IUPAC name: (1R,6R)-5-(6-chloropyridin-3-yl)-9-azabicyclo[4.2.1]non-4-ene
- CAS Number: 200432-86-6
- PubChem CID: 5310970
- CompTox Dashboard (EPA): DTXSID401028829

Chemical and physical data
- Formula: C_{13}H_{15}ClN_{2}
- Molar mass: 234.73 g·mol^{−1}
- 3D model (JSmol): Interactive image
- SMILES: c2nc(Cl)ccc2C1=CCCC3CCC1N3

UB-165 is a drug which acts as an agonist at neuronal nicotinic acetylcholine receptors being a full agonist of the α3β2 isoform and a partial agonist of the α4β2* isoform. It is used to study the role of this receptor subtype in the release of dopamine and noradrenaline in the brain, and has also been used as a lead compound to derive a number of other selective nicotinic receptor ligands.
