= TDBzcholine =

Diazirine analog of acetylcholine

Names
- IUPAC name 4-[(3-Trifluoromethyl)-3H-diazirin-3-yl]benzoylcholine

Identifiers
CAS Number	496972-30-6
3D model (JSmol)	Interactive image
ChemSpider	103875307
PubChem CID	90716102
UNII	NTU9QE4VZL
- InChI: InChI=1S/C14H17F3N3O2/c1-20(2,3)8-9-22-12(21)10-4-6-11(7-5-10)13(18-19-13)14(15,16)17/h4-7H,8-9H2,1-3H3/q+1 Key: IQGNIBHYFCIEEE-UHFFFAOYSA-N
- SMILES: C[N+](C)(C)CCOC(C1=CC=C(C2(C(F)(F)F)N=N2)C=C1)=O

Properties
Chemical formula	C_{14}H_{17}F_{3}N_{3}O_{2}^{+1}
Molar mass	316.304 g·mol^{−1}
- Except where otherwise noted, data are given for materials in their standard state (at 25 °C [77 °F], 100 kPa). Infobox references

TDBzcholine is a diazirine analog of acetylcholine that can be used to label the nicotinic acetylcholine receptor.

== Mechanism of action ==
TDBzcholine is able to bind to the nicotinic acetylcholine receptor. Once TDBzcholine is bound to the receptor, TDBzcholine can be activated by exposing the sample to UV light. This led to formation of a highly reactive carbene radical that can react with amino acid residues in the receptor and become covalently bound to the receptor.

== See also ==
- Photoaffinity labeling
