= CHRNA8 =

Nicotinic acetylcholine receptor subunit

The α8 nicotinic acetylcholine receptor subunit (α8 nAChR; gene: CHRNA8) is a neuronal nicotinic acetylcholine receptor (nAChR) α-subunit identified in non-mammalian vertebrates. The α8 subunit can also form homomeric acetylcholine-gated ion channels and can heteromerize with other nAChR subunits to produce receptors with different pharmacological properties.

α8 is an α-type nAChR subunit and contains the canonical features of neuronal α subunits.

== Clinical relevance ==
Since CHRNA8 is not present in mammalian genomes, it has no direct known clinical associations in humans.

== See also ==
- Nicotinic acetylcholine receptor
- CHRNA7
- Ligand-gated ion channel
