= RJR-2429 =

Chemical compound

Identifiers
- CAS Number: 91556-75-1
- PubChem CID: 10176454
- ChemSpider: 8351959
- UNII: Q2L6T24QLT
- CompTox Dashboard (EPA): DTXSID40436425

Chemical and physical data
- Formula: C_{12}H_{16}N_{2}
- Molar mass: 188.274 g·mol^{−1}
- 3D model (JSmol): Interactive image
- SMILES: C1(C2N(CC3)CCC3C2)=CN=CC=C1
- InChI: InChI=1S/C12H16N2/c1-2-11(9-13-5-1)12-8-10-3-6-14(12)7-4-10/h1-2,5,9-10,12H,3-4,6-8H2; Key:YJYPZLAZNIGNRP-UHFFFAOYSA-N

RJR-2429 is a drug that acts as an agonist at neural nicotinic acetylcholine receptors, binding to both the α3β4 and the α4β2 subtypes. RJR-2429 is stronger than nicotine but weaker than epibatidine in most assays, and with high affinity for both α3β4 and α4β2 subtypes, as well as the less studied α1βγδ subtype.
