= Tetanic fade =

Diminishing muscle

Tetanic fade refers to the diminishing muscle twitch response from an evoked potential stimulation of muscle under the effect of either a non-depolarizing neuromuscular blocking agent, or a muscle that is under a phase 2 depolarizing neuromuscular blocking agent.

== Overview ==
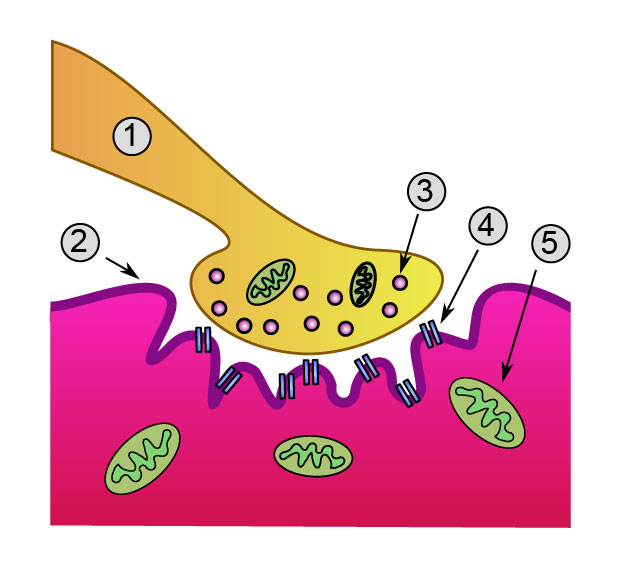
Neuromuscular junction (closer view): 1. presynaptic terminal; 2. sarcolemma; 3. synaptic vesicles; 4. acetylcholine receptors; 5. mitochondrion

In order to transduce an excitatory signal to the muscle, an indication must transduce from the presynaptic neuron's axon terminal, travel across the synaptic cleft and be received correctly in the post synaptic muscle tissue's motor end plate to produce the desired effect, at the right intensity. The signal propagates from the presynaptic neuron using neurotransmitter Acetylcholine (ACh), a molecule that is released from stored vesicles at the terminal end of the neuron. ACh travels across the space of the synaptic cleft to ACh receptors on the sarcolemma of the motor end plate. After unbinding from the receptors, ACh is broken down by the enzyme acetylcholinesterase.

The ACh receptor is a ligand gated channel that goes through a conformational change when it binds to ACh, allowing the flow of calcium, sodium, and potassium down their respective gradients. With enough movement of these ions, an electrochemical potential will form, which is called an endplate potential (EPP). The EPP signal will be propagated through the motor end plate and to the T-tubules to affect the muscle filaments via sodium channels. These sodium channels have a brief activation window, after which they are inactivated until the end plate potential is restored to baseline levels.

== Responses to tetany in muscle tissue ==
=== Without neuromuscular blocking agent ===
Tetany in evoked stimulus, as defined in Morgan & Mikhail's Clinical Anesthesiology as a ≈5 seconds of sustained stimulus of between 50 and a 100 Hz. The reaction of muscle tissue to stimulus under no neuromuscular blockade should be equal in intensity throughout the stimulus: the first muscle twitch and last should be of roughly equal magnitude. Clinically it will present as equal muscle contraction throughout the duration of muscle stimulation.

=== Under non-depolarizing neuromuscular blocking agent ===
Non-depolarizing neuromuscular blocking agents (i.e. Rocuronium, Vecuronium) interact with the Ach receptor without activating the channel, as well as preventing acetylcholine from binding to it. This blocks the signal propagation from the presynaptic neuron, and severs the transduction of the excitatory signal from the synaptic cleft.

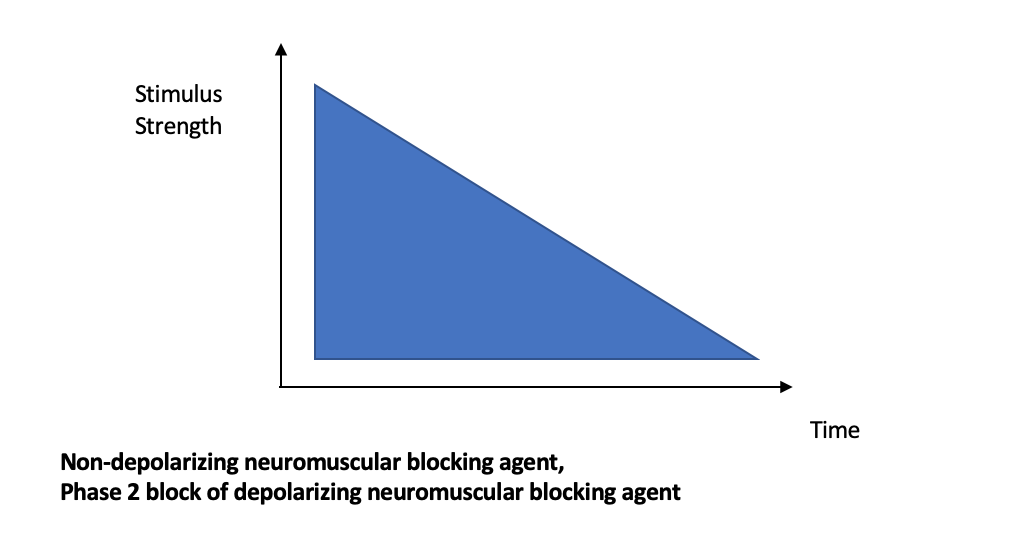
Tetanic Fade in Response to Evoked Electrical Stimulus in muscle Under a Non-Depolarizing Neuromuscular Blocking Agent or Under Phase 2 Block.

Muscle tissue treated with a non-depolarizing neuromuscular blocking agents will produce an indicative response in the form of a tetanic fade, a diminishing response to tetanic stimulation where the initial intensity will be the highest, and the following ones will show lower and lower strength of response.

Some data suggest this response is due to effect of non-depolarizing neuromuscular blocking agents on the presynaptic nerve, leading to lower acetylcholine released during the tetanic stimulation. In normal muscle tissue release of Ach works to stimulate more release of Ach from the presynaptic neuron's axon in a positive feedback manner. In tissue under a non-depolarizing neuromuscular blocking agent, greatly diminished levels of Ach are released into the synaptic cleft.

=== Under depolarizing neuromuscular blocking agent ===
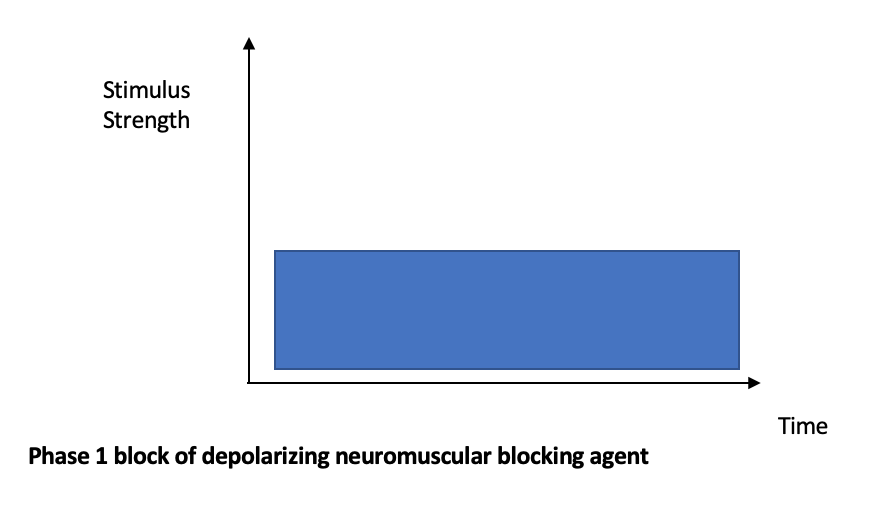
Response of Muscle Tissue to Evoked Tetanic Stimulation Under Phase 1 Block Demonstrate Diminished Response.

Depolarizing neuromuscular blocking agents (i.e. Succinylcholine) employ their effect by binding to the Ach receptor and activating it. Unlike acetylcholine though, the drug is not rapidly degraded by acetylcholinesterase. Succinylcholine propagates in high concentration for longer duration until it is degraded in the plasma and liver by a different enzyme (pseudocholinesterase). This continues to activate the Ach receptor, and prevents sodium channels from recovering to their active state. This leads to muscle relaxation and termed phase 1 block, clinically it will present as a diminished twitch response during tetanic stimulation.

Phase 1 block does not show fade under tetanic stimulation. With further administration of depolarizing neuromuscular blocking agent, an effect that is similar to the response of muscle to non-depolarizing neuromuscular blocking agents can be observed. This response, termed phase 2 block, will demonstrate similar fade under tetanic stimulation, a diminishing response to tetanic stimulation where the initial response will be the strongest, and will produce lower and lower response intensity.
