= Dimethylphenylpiperazinium =

Chemical compound

Identifiers
- IUPAC name: 1,1-Dimethyl-4-phenylpiperazin-1-ium
- CAS Number: 114-28-3
- PubChem CID: 1316
- IUPHAR/BPS: 3967
- ChemSpider: 1276
- UNII: 2FLS86GK2A
- ChEMBL: ChEMBL134752
- CompTox Dashboard (EPA): DTXSID10150626

Chemical and physical data
- Formula: C_{12}H_{19}N_{2}
- Molar mass: 191.298 g·mol^{−1}
- 3D model (JSmol): Interactive image
- SMILES: C[N+]1(CCN(CC1)C2=CC=CC=C2)C
- InChI: InChI=1S/C12H19N2/c1-14(2)10-8-13(9-11-14)12-6-4-3-5-7-12/h3-7H,8-11H2,1-2H3/q+1; Key:MKGIQRNAGSSHRV-UHFFFAOYSA-N

Dimethylphenylpiperazinium (DMPP) is a nicotinic acetylcholine receptor agonist which is selective for the ganglionic subtype. One of the earliest reports on the pharmacology of DMPP, describing it as a ganglion-stimulating, hypertensive agent, came from Graham Chen and his co-workers at Parke, Davis & Co. (Now Pfizer)

== See also ==
- Phenylpiperazine
