= Allosteric enzyme =

Enzymes that change shape and activity

Allosteric enzymes are enzymes that change their conformational ensemble upon binding of an effector (allosteric modulator) which results in an apparent change in binding affinity at a different ligand binding site. This "action at a distance" through binding of one ligand affecting the binding of another at a distinctly different site, is the essence of the allosteric concept. Allostery plays a crucial role in many fundamental biological processes, including but not limited to cell signaling and the regulation of metabolism. Allosteric enzymes need not be oligomers as previously thought, and in fact many systems have demonstrated allostery within single enzymes.

Whereas enzymes without coupled domains/subunits display normal Michaelis-Menten kinetics, most allosteric enzymes have multiple coupled domains/subunits and show cooperative binding. Generally speaking, such cooperativity results in allosteric enzymes displaying a sigmoidal dependence on the concentration of their substrates in positively cooperative systems. This allows most allosteric enzymes to greatly vary catalytic output in response to small changes in effector concentration. Effector molecules, which may be the substrate itself (homotropic effectors) or some other small molecule (heterotropic effector), may cause the enzyme to become more active or less active by redistributing the ensemble between the higher affinity and lower affinity states. The binding sites for heterotropic effectors, called allosteric sites, are usually separate from the active site yet thermodynamically coupled. Allosteric Database (ASD, http://mdl.shsmu.edu.cn/ASD) provides a central resource for the display, search and analysis of the structure, function and related annotation for allosteric molecules, including allosteric enzymes and their modulators. Each enzyme is annotated with detailed description of allostery, biological process and related diseases, and each modulator with binding affinity, physicochemical properties and therapeutic area.

== Kinetic properties ==
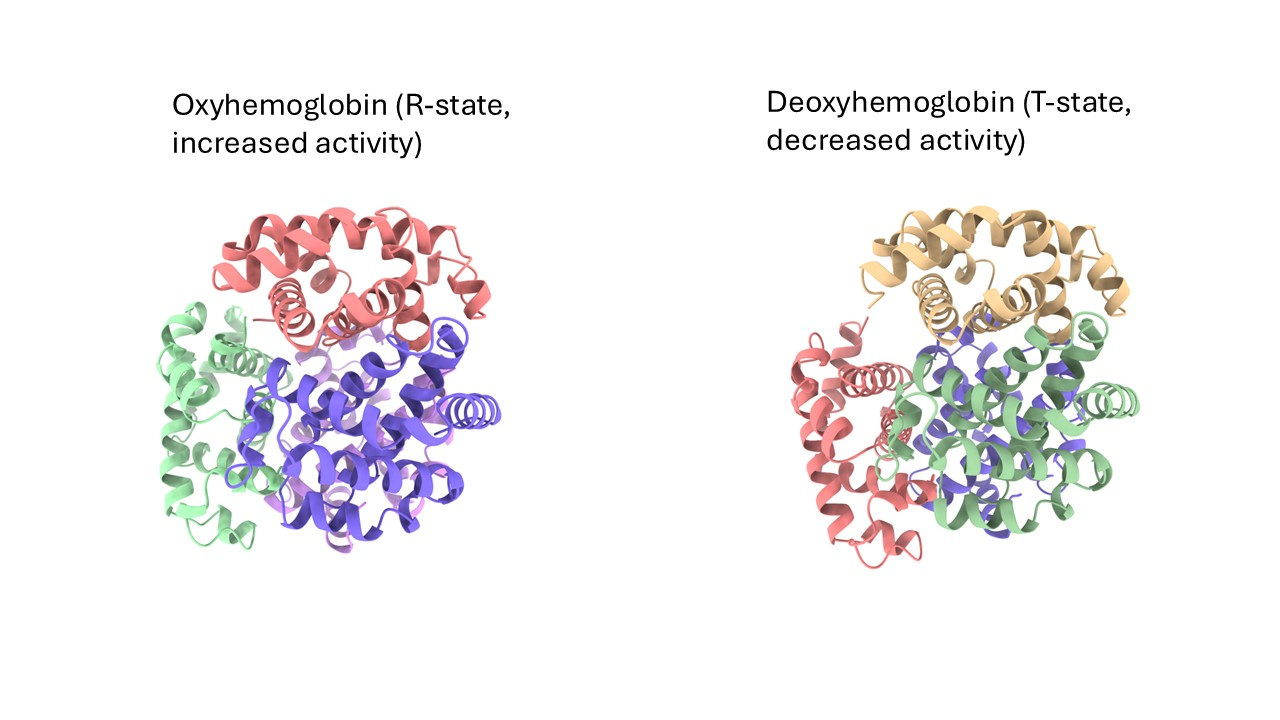
A comparison between the two states of hemoglobin. Oxyhemoglobin, the R state of the hemoglobin, with increased activity is on the left. On the right is deoxyhemoglobin, the T state of the protein, which has decreased activity. Oxyhemoglobin shows a conformational change when oxygen is bound. This conformational change opens up the structure, making the subunits less tightly bound, which increases the probability for further binding of oxygen. This is in comparison to deoxyhemoglobin, which is less open and the subunits are more tightly bound, which results in a lower probability of oxygen binding.

Hemoglobin, though not an enzyme, is the canonical example of an allosteric protein molecule - and one of the earliest to have its crystal structure solved (by Max Perutz). More recently, the E. coli enzyme aspartate carbamoyltransferase (ATCase) has become another good example of allosteric regulation.

The kinetic properties of allosteric enzymes are often explained in terms of a conformational change between a low-activity, low-affinity "tense" or T state and a high-activity, high-affinity "relaxed" or R state. These structurally distinct enzyme forms have been shown to exist in several known allosteric enzymes.

However the molecular basis for conversion between the two states is not well understood. Two main models have been proposed to describe this mechanism: the "concerted model" of Monod, Wyman, and Changeux, and the "sequential model" of Koshland, Nemethy, and Filmer.

In the concerted model, the protein is thought to have two “all-or-none” global states. This model is supported by positive cooperativity where binding of one ligand increases the ability of the enzyme to bind to more ligands. The model is not supported by negative cooperativity where losing one ligand makes it easier for the enzyme to lose more.

In the sequential model there are many different global conformational/energy states. Binding of one ligand changes the enzyme so it can bind more ligands more easily, i.e. every time it binds a ligand it wants to bind another one.

Neither model fully explains allosteric binding, however. The recent combined use of physical techniques (for example, x-ray crystallography and solution small angle x-ray scattering or SAXS) and genetic techniques (site-directed mutagenesis or SDM) may improve our understanding of allostery.
