= 18-Methylaminocoronaridine =

Chemical compound

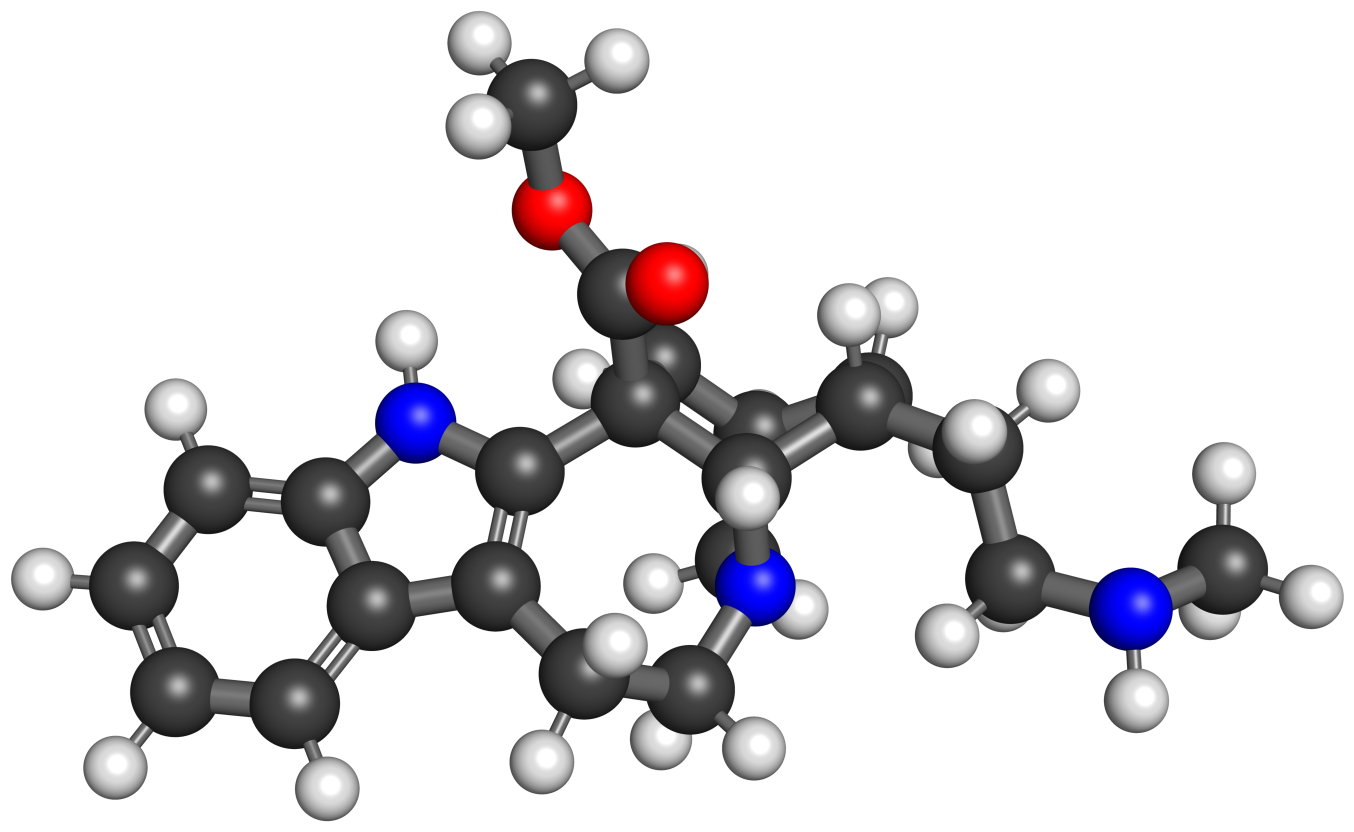

Identifiers
- CAS Number: 1807784-35-5
- PubChem CID: 71308131
- ChemSpider: 24721797
- CompTox Dashboard (EPA): DTXSID301046165

Chemical and physical data
- Formula: C_{22}H_{29}N_{3}O_{2}
- Molar mass: 367.493 g·mol^{−1}
- 3D model (JSmol): Interactive image
- SMILES: c4cccc1c4[nH]c3c1CCN2CC(C5)CC3(C(=O)OC)C2C5CCNC
- InChI: InChI=1S/C22H29N3O2/c1-23-9-7-15-11-14-12-22(21(26)27-2)19-17(8-10-25(13-14)20(15)22)16-5-3-4-6-18(16)24-19/h3-6,14-15,20,23-24H,7-13H2,1-2H3/t14-,15+,20+,22-/m1/s1; Key:YKMOJVPLIUXEIP-SVBQBFEESA-N

(−)-18-Methylaminocoronaridine (18-MAC) is a second generation synthetic derivative of ibogaine developed by the research team led by the pharmacologist Stanley D. Glick from the Albany Medical College and the chemist Martin E. Kuehne from the University of Vermont.

== See also ==
- 2-Methoxyethyl-18-methoxycoronaridinate
- 18-Methoxycoronaridine
- Coronaridine
- Ibogaine
- Noribogaine
- Voacangine
