= CHRNB4 =

Protein-coding gene in humans

Identifiers
- Aliases: CHRNB4, cholinergic receptor nicotinic beta 4 subunit
- External IDs: OMIM: 118509; MGI: 87892; GeneCards: CHRNB4
Available structures
PDB	Ortholog search: PDBe RCSB
PDB	List of PDB id codes 2ASG

Gene location (Human)
Chr.	Chromosome 15 (human)
Band	15q25.1	Start	78,624,111 bp
Band	15q25.1	End	78,727,754 bp

Gene location (Mouse)
Chr.	Chromosome 9 (mouse)
Band	9|9 B	Start	54,935,438 bp
Band	9|9 B	End	54,956,063 bp
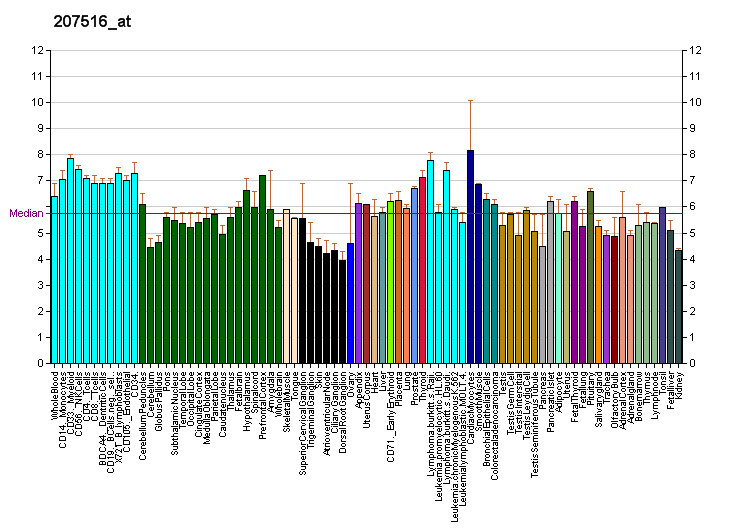
RNA expression pattern
Bgee	Human / Mouse (ortholog); Top expressed in: gonad; testicle; right testis; left testis; ganglionic eminence; muscle layer of sigmoid colon; ventricular zone; sural nerve; right adrenal gland; appendix / Top expressed in: habenula; lumbar spinal ganglion; pineal gland; ciliary body; pretectal area; iris; Paneth cell; embryo; adrenal gland; carotid body; More reference expression data
BioGPS	More reference expression data
Gene ontology
Molecular function	acetylcholine binding; acetylcholine receptor activity; ion channel activity; ligand-gated ion channel activity; protein heterodimerization activity; extracellular ligand-gated ion channel activity; protein binding; acetylcholine-gated cation-selective channel activity; transmembrane signaling receptor activity; transmitter-gated ion channel activity involved in regulation of postsynaptic membrane potential
Cellular component	acetylcholine-gated channel complex; integral component of membrane; postsynaptic membrane; membrane; plasma membrane; synapse; integral component of plasma membrane; cell junction; neuron projection; specific granule membrane; tertiary granule membrane; cholinergic synapse
Biological process	smooth muscle contraction; locomotory behavior; regulation of smooth muscle contraction; protein heterooligomerization; positive regulation of transmission of nerve impulse; regulation of membrane potential; response to nicotine; synaptic transmission, cholinergic; ion transport; regulation of neurotransmitter secretion; behavioral response to nicotine; synaptic transmission involved in micturition; action potential; signal transduction; neutrophil degranulation; regulation of postsynaptic membrane potential; excitatory postsynaptic potential; ion transmembrane transport; chemical synaptic transmission; neuromuscular synaptic transmission; nervous system process
Sources:Amigo / QuickGO
Orthologs
Databases	NCBI: entry; OMA: entry
Species	Human	Mouse
Entrez	1143	108015
Ensembl	ENSG00000117971	ENSMUSG00000035200
UniProt	P30926	Q8R493
RefSeq (mRNA)	NM_000750; NM_001256567	NM_148944
RefSeq (protein)	NP_000741; NP_001243496	NP_683746
Location (UCSC)	Chr 15: 78.62 – 78.73 Mb	Chr 9: 54.94 – 54.96 Mb
PubMed search
- Wikidata
View/Edit Human	View/Edit Mouse

Neuronal acetylcholine receptor subunit beta-4 is a protein that in humans is encoded by the CHRNB4 gene.

== Interactive pathway map ==
Click on genes, proteins and metabolites below to link to respective Wikipedia articles. (Note: The interactive pathway map can be edited at WikiPathways: "NicotineActivityonChromaffinCells_WP1603".)

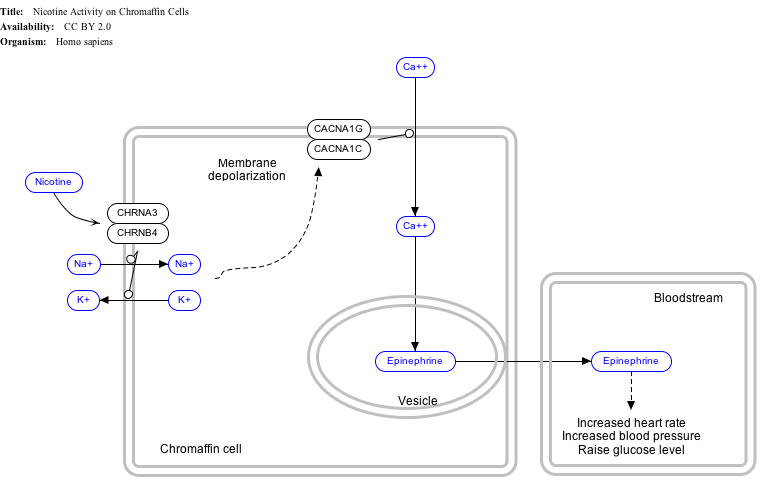

Nicotine Activity on Chromaffin Cells edit

== See also ==
- Nicotinic acetylcholine receptor
