= Fasciculus retroflexus =

Organ of the central nervous system

The fasciculus retroflexus (FR), also known as the fasciculus retroflexus of Meynert or the habenulointerpeduncular tract is a bundle of fibers located at the base of the midbrain in vertebrates. Connected to the habenula (Hbn) and the interpeduncular nucleus (IPN), the fasciculus retroflexus is involved in a variety of bodily phenomena, some being sleep retention and drug addiction. It acts as a channel through which messages are sent between the stria medullaris and the mid- and hindbrain. The fasciculus retroflexus, along with the stria medullaris, the habenula, and the medial forebrain bundle forms a unit for the transfer of neurological impulses. In this unit, the fasciculus retroflexus mediates the transfer of information for processes such as pain, pleasure, and motor control

== Anatomy ==
The fasciculus retroflexus is the main efferent track of the habenula. The FR is an extremely condensed bundle of fibers which consists of two concentric regions. The first of these is the inner fibers of the FR, beginning at the medial habenula and span to interpeduncular nucleus, sometimes referred to as the Hbn-FR-IPN complex. The outer portion runs from the lateral habenula to the RMTg.

== Function ==
The FR functions as the connecting segment between the Hbn and IPN in the Hbn-FR-IPN complex. The function of these three portions are extremely interconnected in their neurological purpose. Signals sent from the habenula to the interpeduncular nucleus must first pass through the core of the fasciculus retroflexus.

== Associations ==
=== REM sleep ===
The placement of the FR makes it a vital pathway for contribution to proper functioning of sleep-wake cycles (Circadian rhythm). The FR has significant influence on REM sleep, specifically. When FR function is hindered, REM sleep was reduced by more than 50% in a study done on rats.

=== Drug addiction ===
The habenula is largely identified as the reward center of the brain, and so a prime target for drug addiction. By association, the fasciculus retroflexus plays a key role in transmitting the messages which cause dependence on certain controlled substances. Many trials have been done specifically linking these connections to nicotine addiction. The basis of drug addiction is tether to the fluctuating levels of dopamine found in our brains. A key inhibitor, which functions to keep these dopamine levels in check, is GABA. The Hbn-FR-IPN makes up the main pathway through which both GABA and dopamine flow. Once drugs are introduced, this area of the brain, the reward and pleasure center is heavily involved. The inhibitory GABAergic cells are located in the nuclei of the RMTg, which is the output of the fasciculus retroflexus's inner portion. The modulation, activation, and inhibition of dopamine is mediated by the habenula and by association the inner and outer fasciculus retroflexus for the duration of drug use; this idea exemplifying its participation in the formation of drug addiction.

== Development ==
=== Early brain development ===
Early brain development of the fasciculus retroflexus, like most tissues of the central nervous system, persists when embryotic non-specified neural tissues begin to grow and differentiate. Both the fasciculus retroflexus and the habenula have been observed to be dependent of the presence Wnt1, as shown in a rat study.

== Clinical significance ==
When FR are lesioned artificially, a reduction in signal transduction is observed. This leads to an understanding that, at least for specific neurons, the FR is vital to the signaling pathways related to the habenula; further solidifying the proposed structure and function of the FR, proving that its core channel is necessary for response output. The study of these lesions leads to an understanding of how defects in a mammal's Hbn-FR-IPN complex, or more specifically their fasciculus retroflexus, could potentially lead to decreased response time and signal transduction; insinuating that defects hold consequences in the central nervous system. Likewise, since the FR was found to be such a vital part of habenula function, loss of functionality in the FR would lead to co-malfunction in the habenula, which has been found to cause imbalances leading to anxiety, depression, and even schizophrenia.
