= Hedonic motivation =

Hedonic motivation refers to the influence of a person's pleasure and pain receptors on their willingness to move towards a goal or away from a threat. This is linked to the classic motivational principle that people approach pleasure and avoid pain, and is gained from acting on certain behaviors that resulted from esthetic and emotional feelings such as: love, hate, fear, joy, etc. According to the hedonic principle, our emotional experience can be thought of as a gauge that ranges from bad to good and our primary motivation is to keep the needle on the gauge as close to good as possible.

== History ==
Historically, approach and avoidance motivation have been linked to the hedonic characteristics of pleasure and pain. The root word hedonic comes from the Greek word for “sweet”, which means relating to or characterized by pleasure. This is interesting because even though hedonic motivation incorporates the pursuit of pleasure as well as the avoidance of painful situations, the concept has been traditionally linked to the positive connotation of pleasure. For example, hedonic goods are bought so that the consumer may gain pleasure and enjoyment from the good, and value experiences are also viewed as hedonic experiences.

== Different views ==
As the term "hedonic motivation" occurred, different types of interpretations and views also occurred as well.

Socrates was one of the first few people to start interpreting Hedonic motivation. He viewed it as a person should follow a course of action for which pleasure exceeds pain and if a person does not follow that path, it is because they do not fully understand the knowledge of the pleasure or pain that can result.

Democritus viewed hedonic motivation along the same lines as Socrates’, but he did not have a defining definition of what was pleasurable and what was painful besides that people enjoy pleasure and people avoid pain. His take on hedonic motivation was that people have their own definitions on what is pleasurable and painful to them.

Epicurus viewed hedonic motivation as that pain and pleasure eventually even out and people learn how to do things in moderation.

As these early views of hedonic motivation took place, later philosophers also took an interest in their own interpretations.

Thomas Hobbes’ viewed hedonic motivation as people tend to approach pleasurable/positive environmental events and avoid painful/negative environmental events, also known as incentive motivation. Our learned remembrance on whether something was pleasurable or unpleasant sets our motivation to approach that event.

To go off on Hobbes’ views, Jeremy Bentham believed people are slaves to pleasure and pain and that hedonic motivation is determined by positive or negative consequences. Bentham believed in decision theory in which of all the possible end-states, which one would we choose? As people weigh pros and cons of each outcome, people will choose the one with the most positive outcomes. He also believed in the phrase principle of utility which is an idea that people choose their actions based on if it increases or decreases their happiness. Examples of utility is money because it increases a person's happiness.

Sigmund Freud viewed hedonic motivation as people tend to look at the long-term pleasure/happiness of things and would rather take the immediate discomfort if they know they will have a pleasurable outcome later on, also known as the reality principle. Freud presented the term pleasure principle which refers to a person's pursuit of pleasure that is obtained from a decrease in psychological tension.

Herbert Spencer viewed hedonic motivation by stating that pain and pleasure motivate behavior when those feelings reach a person's consciousness. He believed that people bring feelings or pleasure into their mind of consciousness while also driving out feelings of pain. He believed that pleasure supported behaviors that benefit life while pain supported behaviors that bring harm into their lives. He further explained that the longing anticipation of pain or pleasure is the guide of motivation for a person and their behaviors.

To follow up with Spencer, Edward Lee Thorndike viewed hedonic motivation the same way and stemmed many of his ideas from Spencer. Thorndike formulated the idea of law and effect which explains the idea that behavior followed by satisfying consequences is strengthened and if followed by unsatisfying consequences weakened.

== Theories ==
There are several theories that exert characteristics of Hedonic motivation and behavior, and rely on these qualities to better understand human purpose and human nature.

=== Beneception and nociception ===
One of the oldest examples is probably the Greeks' theory of beneception and nociception. They believed that these two principles decided the motivation in all living things. Beneception is a term that is linked to pleasure and positive hedonic motivation; it is key to animal's survival that they follow this instinct towards a purpose. Nociception is the opposite of beneception and is concerned with consequences and negative hedonic motivation. If an animal does not flee from or avoid nociception they are likely to be faced with unpleasant effects.

=== Appetitive and aversive emotions ===
Another set of key terms similar to the two the Greeks used to describe hedonic motivation is appetitive emotion and aversive motivation. Appetitive emotions are described as goals that can be associated with the positive hedonic processes of survival and pleasure, such as food and sex. Aversive motivation is about removing oneself from unpleasant situations.

=== Affect-rich and affect-poor ===
When it comes to consumers buying goods, affect-rich and affect-poor items help determine how the consumer views and desires different products. Affect-rich items are those that can produce associative imagery in the mind of the consumer, portraying it in a pleasing light and making it desirable. This kind of strategy plays with positive hedonic motivation and convinces the consumer to buy the product because they will enjoy using it. Affect-poor items do not offer that kind of imagery and are therefore connected with utilitarian purposes. While income facilitates item purchase behaviour, income's influence on purchase motivation is unclear. A survey of 403 rich and poor Chinese fashion consumers have, for example, no significant difference in their motivations to purchase fashion items.

=== Operant conditioning theory ===
Operant Conditioning theory is a well-known theory that also deals with hedonic processes; it is a model that includes three different changing and molding behavior. Positive reinforcement is the first area of this it offers giving a reward to increase the probability of changing a certain behavior. This presents a positive hedonic impact by them . Negative reinforcement follows the idea that getting rid of an unpleasant hedonic motivation that animals will move towards acquiring a pleasurable stimulus and attempt to end or escape a painful or uncomfortable stimulus. The third part of Operant Conditioning Theory is punishment. Punishment believes that introducing a painful or unpleasant stimulant will smother a behavior into changing. These theories exemplify how this motivation is by showing how hedonic processes are able to fit into a wide variety of situations while still maintaining the same function.

== Hedonic versus utilitarian goods ==
Under the study for Hedonic motivation, there is substantial research on how this type of motivation can influence people's shopping habits. Hedonic goods are consumed for luxury purposes, which are desirable objects that allow the consumer to feel pleasure, fun, and enjoyment from buying the product. This is the difference from Utilitarian goods, which are purchased for their practical uses and are based on the consumer's needs. Because of this, the consumer is generally willing to spend more on luxury hedonic items because they can rationalize that these items are more enjoyable, and won't be purchased very frequently, which allows the buyer to be less price sensitive towards these items. It is, however, important to note that in any purchase situation a consumer evaluates both hedonic and utilitarian motivation values simultaneously, both leading toward a purchase decision. Hedonic and utilitarian motivation are, however, different between geographic regions. China has, for example, different shopping motivations to Western nations.

These goods could constitute anything from pedicures to art to furniture to new power tools to fine chocolate; basically anything that a consumer enjoys on less than a regular basis. Utility goods are items that are purchased frequently and are a regular part of the consumer's life, which allows the consumer to be more price sensitive towards these goods because they are purchased and used frequently. These items can be cleaning fluid, laundry detergent, clothing, toilet paper, or other items that a consumer uses regularly. Guilt also has a tendency to be associated with hedonic purchases. This is due to these items being bought for means that are associated with pleasure and excess, not items that are necessary for daily life and are therefore not as easy to justify buying as utilitarian items.

Luxury goods and utilitarian goods both serve purposes for consumers when shopping. The positive hedonic influence comes from the buying of luxury goods for enjoyment and stimulation, and utilitarian goods are items bought out of necessity and don't necessarily bring any joy to the consumer. These are both areas of hedonic motivation that work on the consumers preferences and are expressed through physical goods and services purchased.

== Pain and pleasure ==
Pleasure-seeking is the most basic of all motives, and social influence often involves creating situations in which others can achieve more pleasure by doing what we want them to do than by doing something else. Parents, teachers and governments often try to influence our behavior by offering rewards and threatening punishments. When the Republic of Singapore warned its citizens that anyone caught chewing in public would face a year in prison and a $5,500 fine, gum-chewing in that country fell to an all-time low. It can also be difficult to remain in the confines that people simply do things to attain pleasure and move to avoid pain, because as we have grown and evolved as a species, so have our motives. People sometimes put themselves in harms way in order to experience emotional pain, and there are two explanations for this. First, this could happen because a person feels that they need to learn how to handle painful or unpleasing events, or second, that they are better preparing themselves for future situations. Both of these answers are coping mechanisms for events that have not come to pass, but do seek long-term positive hedonic impact by experiencing negative situations at the moment. Other situations involve a person overcoming initial resistance towards going on the journey to attain a goal because the path to it is unpleasant but the end result is hedonically positive. Also, there are situations where, as a person attempts to attain a goal, an unpleasant obstacle may hinder that pursuit, this strengthens the level of engagement towards obtaining the goal and makes the end target seem more attractive.

== See also ==
- Hedonism
- Self-determination theory
- Affective neuroscience
- Reward system
- Motivational salience
- Pleasure principle (psychology)
