= CHRNB2 =

Protein-coding gene in humans

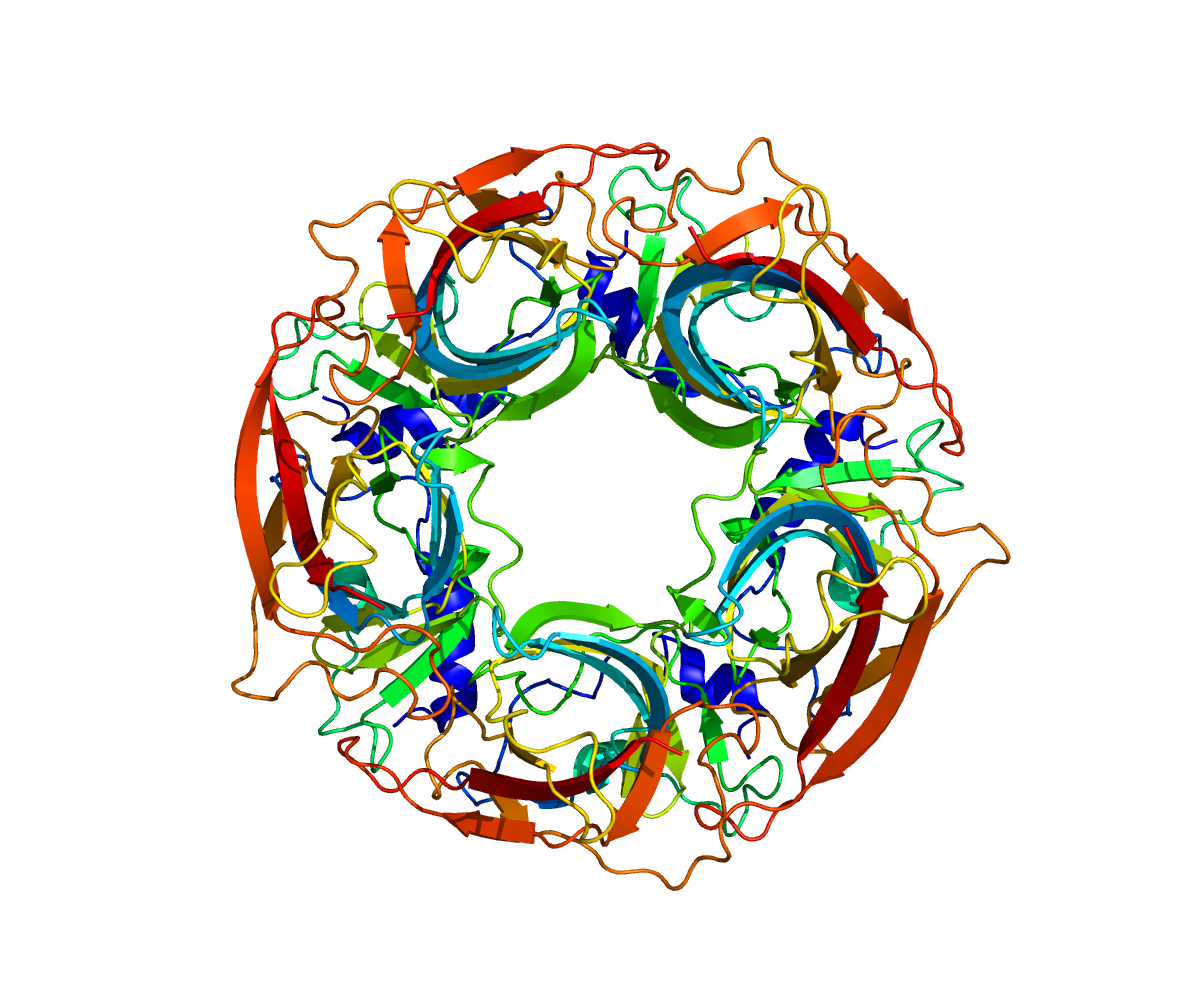

Identifiers
- Aliases: CHRNB2, EFNL3, nAChRB2, cholinergic receptor nicotinic beta 2 subunit
- External IDs: OMIM: 118507; MGI: 87891; GeneCards: CHRNB2
Available structures
PDB	Ortholog search: PDBe RCSB
PDB	List of PDB id codes 2K58, 2K59, 2KSR, 2LM2

Gene location (Human)
Chr.	Chromosome 1 (human)
Band	1q21.3	Start	154,567,778 bp
Band	1q21.3	End	154,580,013 bp

Gene location (Mouse)
Chr.	Chromosome 3 (mouse)
Band	3 F1|3 39.19 cM	Start	89,653,502 bp
Band	3 F1|3 39.19 cM	End	89,671,939 bp
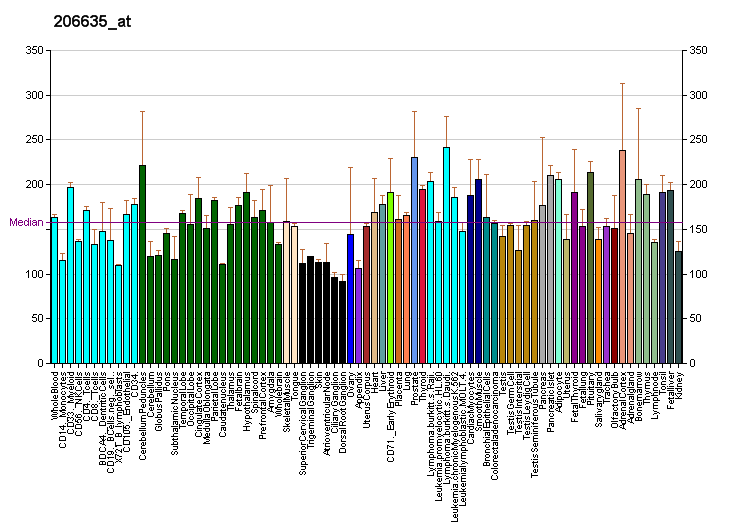
RNA expression pattern
Bgee	Human / Mouse (ortholog); Top expressed in: beta cell; vena cava; lateral nuclear group of thalamus; pars reticulata; external globus pallidus; subthalamic nucleus; mucosa of pharynx; ventral tegmental area; body of tongue; pars compacta / Top expressed in: medial dorsal nucleus; medial geniculate nucleus; lateral geniculate nucleus; habenula; cerebellar cortex; glomerulus; dentate gyrus of hippocampal formation granule cell; dorsal tegmental nucleus; superior colliculus; ventral tegmental area; More reference expression data
BioGPS	More reference expression data
Gene ontology
Molecular function	acetylcholine binding; acetylcholine receptor activity; ion channel activity; protein binding; ligand-gated ion channel activity; protein heterodimerization activity; extracellular ligand-gated ion channel activity; acetylcholine-gated cation-selective channel activity; transmembrane signaling receptor activity; transmitter-gated ion channel activity involved in regulation of postsynaptic membrane potential
Cellular component	acetylcholine-gated channel complex; integral component of membrane; postsynaptic membrane; membrane; plasma membrane; synapse; cell junction; external side of plasma membrane; integral component of plasma membrane; neuron projection; plasma membrane raft; dopaminergic synapse; cholinergic synapse; integral component of presynaptic membrane; integral component of postsynaptic specialization membrane
Biological process	visual learning; regulation of synaptic transmission, dopaminergic; response to cocaine; smooth muscle contraction; regulation of circadian sleep/wake cycle, REM sleep; regulation of dopamine secretion; response to hypoxia; associative learning; cognition; locomotory behavior; protein heterooligomerization; central nervous system neuron axonogenesis; optic nerve morphogenesis; regulation of synapse assembly; regulation of membrane potential; response to nicotine; membrane depolarization; nervous system process; synaptic transmission, cholinergic; ion transport; hearing; learning; memory; negative regulation of action potential; regulation of dopamine metabolic process; behavioral response to nicotine; regulation of dendrite morphogenesis; B cell activation; neuromuscular synaptic transmission; synaptic transmission involved in micturition; positive regulation of dopamine secretion; positive regulation of B cell proliferation; regulation of circadian sleep/wake cycle, non-REM sleep; vestibulocochlear nerve development; conditioned taste aversion; transport; social behavior; action potential; sensory perception of pain; lateral geniculate nucleus development; positive regulation of synaptic transmission, dopaminergic; response to ethanol; central nervous system projection neuron axonogenesis; calcium ion transport; signal transduction; visual perception; ion transmembrane transport; regulation of postsynaptic membrane potential; excitatory postsynaptic potential; acetylcholine receptor signaling pathway; chemical synaptic transmission; response to acetylcholine; regulation of synaptic vesicle exocytosis
Sources:Amigo / QuickGO
Orthologs
Databases	NCBI: entry; OMA: entry
Species	Human	Mouse
Entrez	1141	11444
Ensembl	ENSG00000160716	ENSMUSG00000027950
UniProt	P17787	Q9ERK7
RefSeq (mRNA)	NM_000748	NM_009602
RefSeq (protein)	NP_000739	NP_033732
Location (UCSC)	Chr 1: 154.57 – 154.58 Mb	Chr 3: 89.65 – 89.67 Mb
PubMed search
- Wikidata
View/Edit Human	View/Edit Mouse

Neuronal acetylcholine receptor subunit beta-2 is a protein that in humans is encoded by the CHRNB2 gene.

Neuronal acetylcholine receptors are homo- or heteropentameric complexes composed of homologous alpha and beta subunits. They belong to a superfamily of ligand-gated ion channels which allow the flow of sodium and potassium across the plasma membrane in response to ligands such as acetylcholine and nicotine. This gene encodes one of several beta subunits. Mutations in this gene are associated with autosomal dominant nocturnal frontal lobe epilepsy.

It has been discovered that suppression, rather than stimulation, of B2-containing nAChR currents yields an antidepressant effect. This is believed to explain the significantly increased prevalence of cigarette smoking in depressed individuals and the profound rise in depressive symptoms during abstinence.

== Interactive pathway map ==
Click on genes, proteins and metabolites below to link to respective articles. (Note: The interactive pathway map can be edited at WikiPathways: "NicotineDopaminergic_WP1602".)

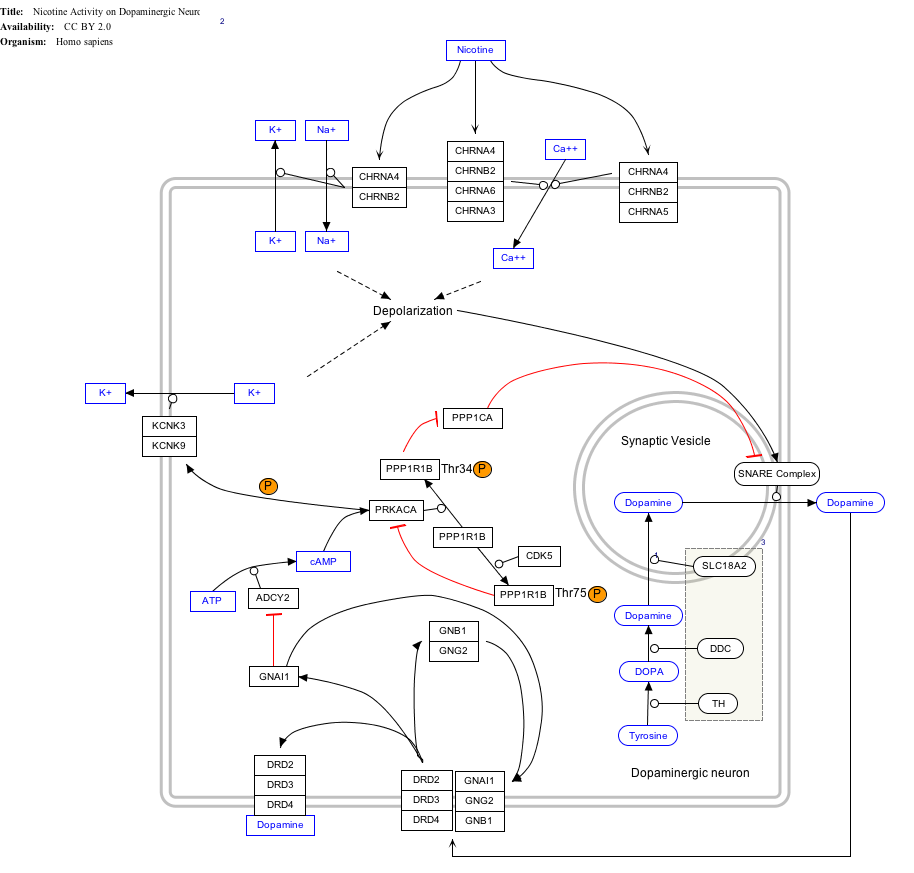

Nicotine Activity on Dopaminergic Neurons edit

== See also ==
- Nicotinic acetylcholine receptor
