= CHRNA3 =

Protein-coding gene in humans

Identifiers
- Aliases: CHRNA3, LNCR2, NACHRA3, PAOD2, cholinergic receptor nicotinic alpha 3 subunit, BAIPRCK
- External IDs: OMIM: 118503; MGI: 87887; GeneCards: CHRNA3
Available structures
PDB	Ortholog search: PDBe RCSB
PDB	List of PDB id codes 4ZK4

Gene location (Human)
Chr.	Chromosome 15 (human)
Band	15q25.1	Start	78,593,052 bp
Band	15q25.1	End	78,621,295 bp

Gene location (Mouse)
Chr.	Chromosome 9 (mouse)
Band	9|9 B	Start	54,917,395 bp
Band	9|9 B	End	54,933,846 bp
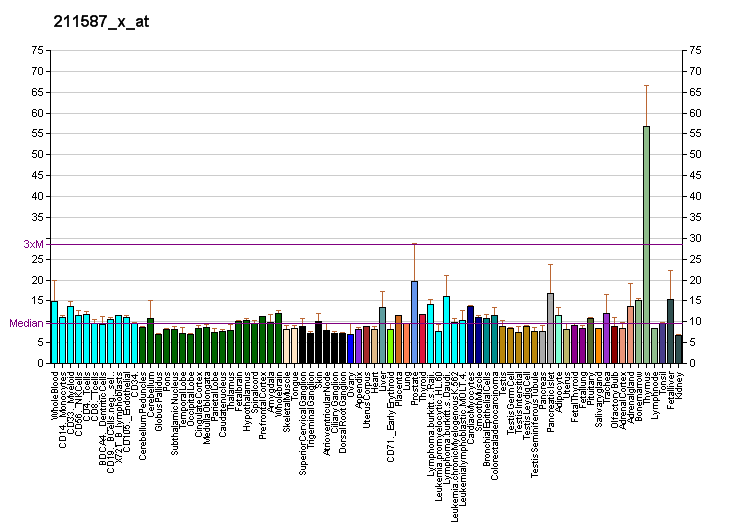

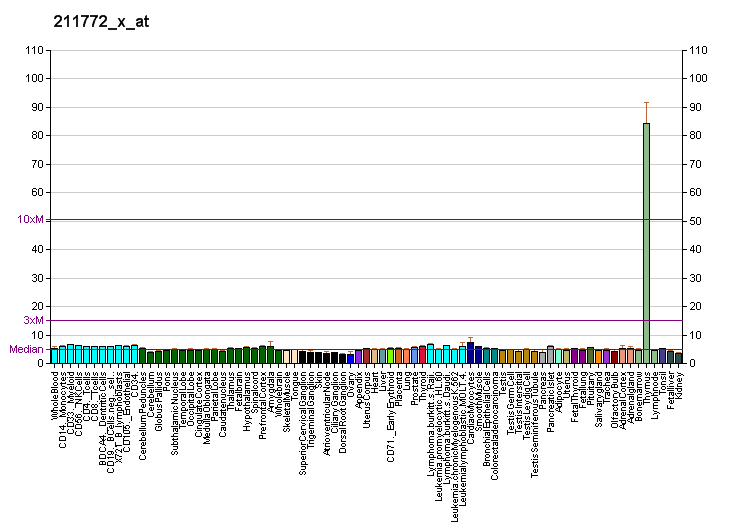

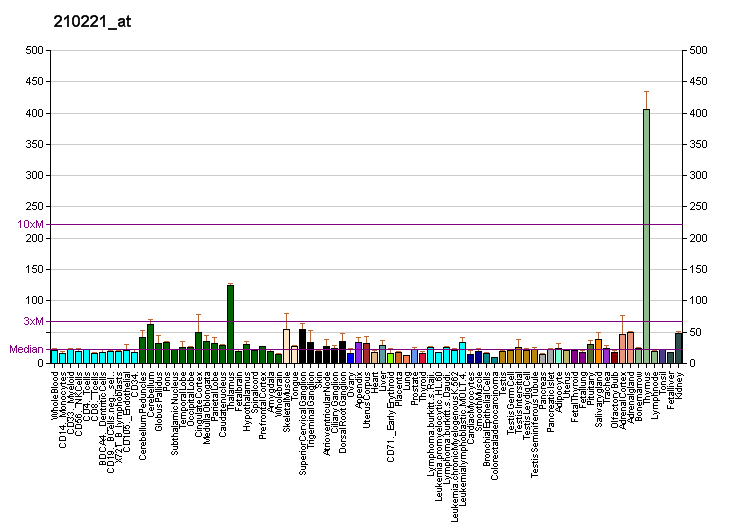
RNA expression pattern
Bgee	Human / Mouse (ortholog); Top expressed in: retinal pigment epithelium; thymus; gonad; buccal mucosa cell; secondary oocyte; testicle; muscle layer of sigmoid colon; lateral nuclear group of thalamus; appendix; rectum / Top expressed in: lumbar spinal ganglion; habenula; superior cervical ganglion; pineal gland; neural tube; adrenal gland; gray matter layer of cerebellum; stellate ganglion; trigeminal ganglion; embryo; More reference expression data
BioGPS	More reference expression data
Gene ontology
Molecular function	ion channel activity; ligand-gated ion channel activity; extracellular ligand-gated ion channel activity; acetylcholine binding; acetylcholine receptor activity; transmembrane signaling receptor activity; protein binding; acetylcholine-gated cation-selective channel activity
Cellular component	integral component of membrane; postsynaptic membrane; membrane; plasma membrane; synapse; cell junction; dendrite; acetylcholine-gated channel complex; postsynaptic density; soma; integral component of plasma membrane; neuron projection; plasma membrane raft
Biological process	locomotory behavior; regulation of smooth muscle contraction; regulation of membrane potential; regulation of acetylcholine secretion, neurotransmission; synaptic transmission, cholinergic; ion transport; cation transmembrane transport; nervous system development; behavioral response to nicotine; regulation of dendrite morphogenesis; synaptic transmission involved in micturition; excitatory postsynaptic potential; transport; activation of transmembrane receptor protein tyrosine kinase activity; signal transduction; ion transmembrane transport; chemical synaptic transmission; neuromuscular synaptic transmission; response to nicotine; nervous system process; acetylcholine receptor signaling pathway; response to acetylcholine
Sources:Amigo / QuickGO
Orthologs
Databases	NCBI: entry; OMA: entry
Species	Human	Mouse
Entrez	1136	110834
Ensembl	ENSG00000080644	ENSMUSG00000032303
UniProt	P32297	Q8R4G9
RefSeq (mRNA)	NM_000743; NM_001166694	NM_145129
RefSeq (protein)	NP_000734; NP_001160166	NP_660111
Location (UCSC)	Chr 15: 78.59 – 78.62 Mb	Chr 9: 54.92 – 54.93 Mb
PubMed search
- Wikidata
View/Edit Human	View/Edit Mouse

Neuronal acetylcholine receptor subunit alpha-3, also known as nAChRα3, is a protein that in humans is encoded by the CHRNA3 gene. The protein encoded by this gene is a subunit of certain nicotinic acetylcholine receptors (nAchR). Research with mecamylamine in animals has implicated alpha-3-containing nAChRs in the abusive and addictive properties of ethanol.

== Interactive pathway map ==
[[File:

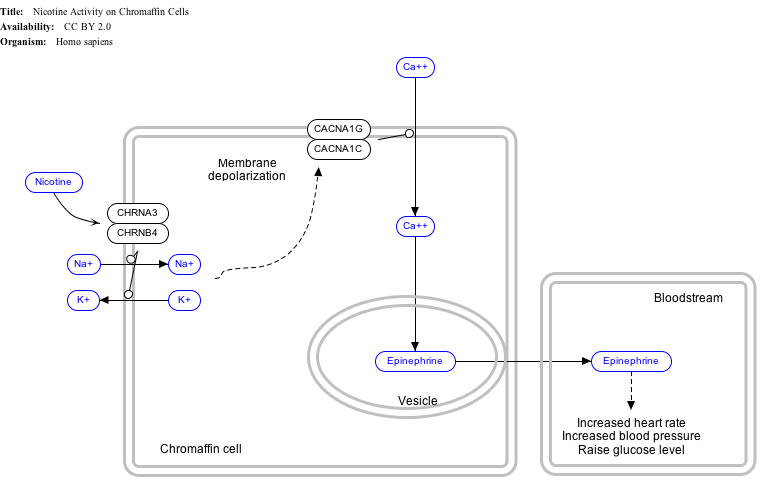

Nicotine Activity on Chromaffin Cells edit
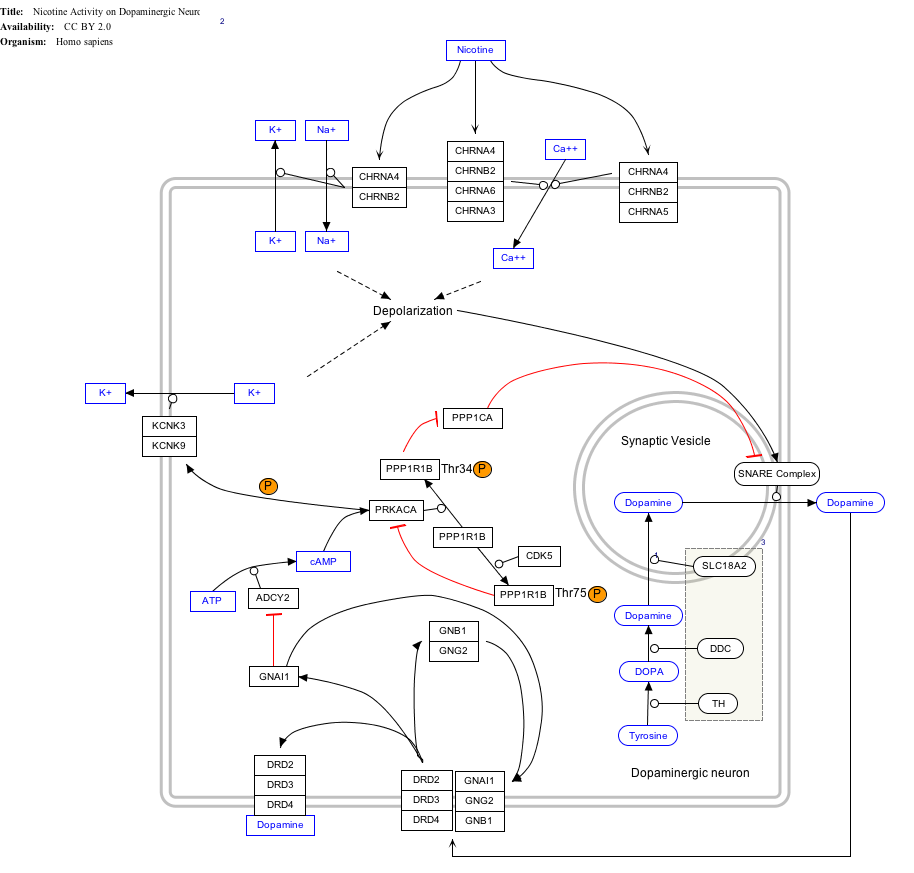

Nicotine Activity on Dopaminergic Neurons edit

== See also ==
- Nicotinic acetylcholine receptor
