= Nicotinic acetylcholine receptor =

Acetylcholine receptors named for their selective binding of nicotine

Acetylcholine

Nicotine

Nicotinic acetylcholine receptors, or nAChRs, are receptor polypeptides that respond to the neurotransmitter acetylcholine. Nicotinic receptors also respond to drugs such as the agonist nicotine. They are found in the central and peripheral nervous system, muscle, and many other tissues of many organisms. At the neuromuscular junction they are the primary receptor in muscle for motor nerve-muscle communication that controls muscle contraction. In the peripheral nervous system: (1) they transmit outgoing signals from the presynaptic to the postsynaptic cells within the sympathetic and parasympathetic nervous system; and (2) they are the receptors found on skeletal muscle that receives acetylcholine released to signal for muscular contraction. In the immune system, nAChRs regulate inflammatory processes and signal through distinct intracellular pathways. In insects, the cholinergic system is limited to the central nervous system.

The nicotinic receptors are considered cholinergic receptors, because they respond to acetylcholine. Nicotinic receptors get their name from nicotine, which selectively binds to nicotinic receptors but not to other acetylcholine receptors. (The other type of acetylcholine receptor, the muscarinic receptor, likewise gets its name from a chemical that selectively attaches to that receptor: muscarine. Acetylcholine itself binds to both muscarinic and nicotinic acetylcholine receptors.)

As ionotropic receptors, nAChRs are directly linked to ion channels. Some evidence suggests that these receptors can also use second messengers (as metabotropic receptors do) in some cases. Nicotinic acetylcholine receptors are the best-studied of the ionotropic receptors.

Since nicotinic receptors help transmit outgoing signals for the sympathetic and parasympathetic systems, nicotinic receptor antagonists such as hexamethonium interfere with the transmission of these signals. Thus, for example, nicotinic receptor antagonists interfere with the baroreflex that normally corrects changes in blood pressure by sympathetic and parasympathetic stimulation of the heart.

== Structure ==
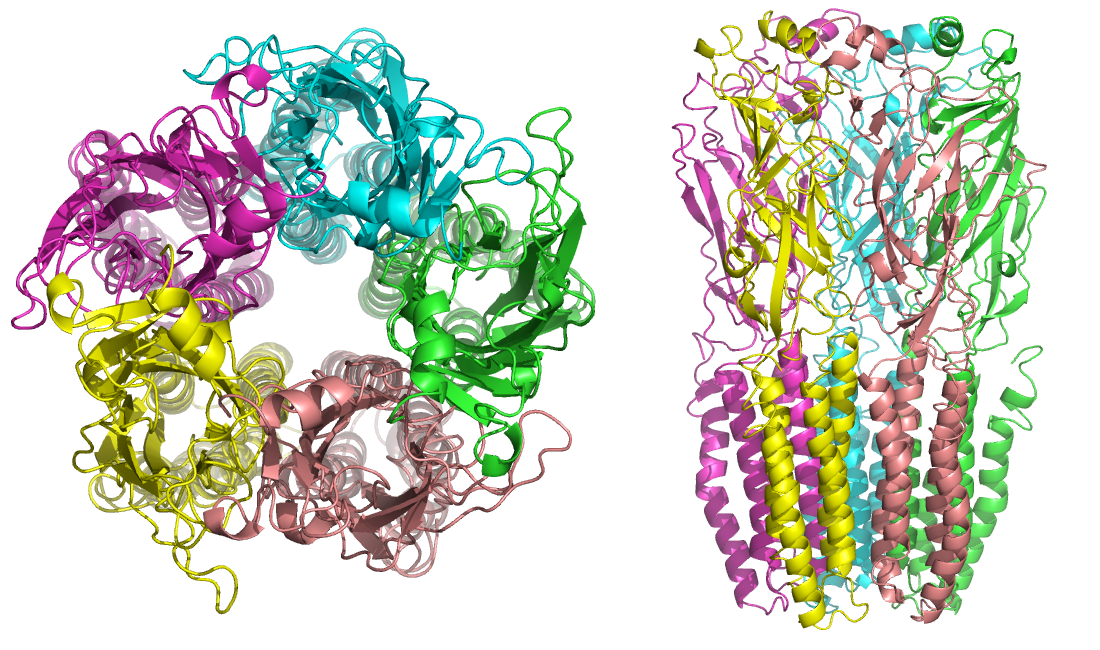
Nicotinic receptor structure

Nicotinic receptors, with a molecular mass of 290 kDa, are made up of five subunits, arranged symmetrically around a central pore. Each subunit comprises four transmembrane domains with both the N- and C-terminus located extracellularly. They possess similarities with GABA_{A} receptors, glycine receptors, and the type 3 serotonin receptors (which are all ionotropic receptors), or the signature Cys-loop proteins.

In vertebrates, nicotinic receptors are broadly classified into two subtypes based on their primary sites of expression: muscle-type nicotinic receptors and neuronal-type nicotinic receptors. In the muscle-type receptors, found at the neuromuscular junction, receptors are either the embryonic form, composed of α_{1}, β_{1}, γ, and δ subunits in a 2:1:1:1 ratio ((α_{1})_{2}β_{1}γδ), or the adult form composed of α_{1}, β_{1}, δ, and ε subunits in a 2:1:1:1 ratio ((α_{1})_{2}β_{1}δε). The neuronal subtypes are various homomeric (all one type of subunit) or heteromeric (at least one α and one β) combinations of twelve different nicotinic receptor subunits: α_{2}−α_{10} and β_{2}−β_{4}. Examples of the neuronal subtypes include: (α_{4})_{3}(β_{2})_{2}, (α_{4})_{2}(β_{2})_{3}, (α_{3})_{2}(β_{4})_{3}, α_{4}α_{6}β_{3}(β_{2})_{2}, (α_{7})_{5}, and many others. In both muscle-type and neuronal-type receptors, the subunits are very similar to one another, especially in the hydrophobic regions.

A number of electron microscopy and x-ray crystallography studies have provided very high resolution structural information for muscle and neuronal nAChRs and their binding domains.

== Binding ==
As with all ligand-gated ion channels, opening of the nAChR channel pore requires the binding of a chemical messenger. Several different terms are used to refer to the molecules that bind receptors, such as ligand, agonist, or transmitter. As well as the endogenous agonist acetylcholine, agonists of the nAChR include nicotine, epibatidine, and choline. Nicotinic antagonists that block the receptor include mecamylamine, dihydro-β-erythroidine, α-bungarotoxin, and hexamethonium.

In muscle-type nAChRs, the acetylcholine binding sites are located at the α and either ε or δ subunits interface. In neuronal nAChRs, the binding site is located at the interface of an α and a β subunit or between two α subunits in the case of α_{7} receptors. The binding site is located in the extracellular domain near the N terminus. When an agonist binds to the site, all present subunits undergo a conformational change and the channel is opened and a pore with a diameter of about 0.65 nm opens.

== Channel opening ==
Nicotinic AChRs may exist in different interconvertible conformational states. Binding of an agonist stabilizes the open and desensitized states. In normal physiological conditions, the receptor needs exactly two molecules of ACh to open. Opening of the channel allows positively charged ions to move across it; in particular, sodium enters the cell and potassium exits. The net flow of positively charged ions is inward.

The nAChR is a non-selective cation channel, meaning that several different positively charged ions can cross through. It is permeable to Na^{+} and K^{+}, with some subunit combinations that are also permeable to Ca^{2+}. The amount of sodium and potassium the channels allow through their pores (their conductance) varies from 50 to 110 pS, with the conductance depending on the specific subunit composition as well as the permeant ion.

Many neuronal nAChRs can affect the release of other neurotransmitters. The channel usually opens rapidly and tends to remain open until the agonist diffuses away, which usually takes about 1 millisecond. AChRs can spontaneously open with no ligands bound or can spontaneously close with ligands bound, and mutations in the channel can shift the likelihood of either event. Therefore, ACh binding changes the probability of pore opening, which increases as more ACh binds.

The nAChR is unable to bind ACh when bound to any of the snake venom α-neurotoxins. These α-neurotoxins antagonistically bind tightly and noncovalently to nAChRs of skeletal muscles and in neurons, thereby blocking the action of ACh at the postsynaptic membrane, inhibiting ion flow and leading to paralysis and death. The nAChR contains two binding sites for snake venom neurotoxins. Progress in discovering the dynamics of binding action of these sites has proved difficult, although recent studies using normal mode dynamics have aided in predicting the nature of both the binding mechanisms of snake toxins and of ACh to nAChRs. These studies have shown that a twist-like motion caused by ACh binding is likely responsible for pore opening, and that one or two molecules of α-bungarotoxin (or other long-chain α-neurotoxin) suffice to halt this motion. The toxins seem to lock together neighboring receptor subunits, inhibiting the twist and therefore, the opening motion.

== Effects ==
The activation of receptors by nicotine modifies the state of neurons through two main mechanisms. On one hand, the movement of cations causes a depolarization of the plasma membrane (which results in an excitatory postsynaptic potential in neurons) leading to the activation of voltage-gated ion channels. On the other hand, the entry of calcium acts, either directly or indirectly, on different intracellular cascades. This leads, for example, to the regulation of activity of some genes or the release of neurotransmitters.

== Regulation ==
=== Desensitization ===
Ligand-bound desensitization of receptors was first characterized by Katz and Thesleff in the nicotinic acetylcholine receptor.

Prolonged or repeated exposure to a stimulus often results in decreased responsiveness of that receptor toward a stimulus, termed desensitization. nAChR function can be modulated by phosphorylation by the activation of second messenger-dependent protein kinases. PKA and PKC, as well as tyrosine kinases, have been shown to phosphorylate the nAChR resulting in its desensitization. It has been reported that, after prolonged receptor exposure to the agonist, the agonist itself causes an agonist-induced conformational change in the receptor, resulting in receptor desensitization.

Desensitized receptors can revert to a prolonged open state when an agonist is bound in the presence of a positive allosteric modulator, for example PNU-120,596. Also, there is evidence that indicates specific chaperone molecules have regulatory effects on these receptors.

== Roles ==
The subunits of the nicotinic receptors belong to a multigene family (16 members in humans) and the assembly of combinations of subunits results in a large number of different receptors (for more information see the Ligand-Gated Ion Channel database). These receptors, with highly variable kinetic, electrophysiological and pharmacological properties, respond to nicotine differently, at very different effective concentrations. This functional diversity allows them to take part in two major types of neurotransmission. Classical synaptic transmission (wiring transmission) involves the release of high concentrations of neurotransmitter, acting on immediately neighboring receptors. In contrast, paracrine transmission (volume transmission) involves neurotransmitters released by axon terminals, which then diffuse through the extra-cellular medium until they reach their receptors, which may be distant. Nicotinic receptors can also be found in different synaptic locations; for example the muscle nicotinic receptor always functions post-synaptically. The neuronal forms of the receptor can be found both post-synaptically (involved in classical neurotransmission) and pre-synaptically where they can influence the release of multiple neurotransmitters. Nicotine addiction arises from nAChR-mediated dopamine release in the mesolimbic pathway.

== Subunits ==
17 vertebrate nAChR subunits have been identified, which are divided into muscle-type and neuronal-type subunits. Although an α_{8} subunit/gene is present in avian species such as the chicken, it is not present in human or mammalian species.

The nAChR subunits have been divided into four subfamilies (I–IV) based on similarities in protein sequence. In addition, subfamily III has been further divided into three types.

Neuronal-type					Muscle-type
I	II	III			IV
α9, α10	α7, α8	1	2	3	α1, β1, δ, γ, ε
α9, α10	α7, α8	α2, α3, α4, α6	β2, β4	β3, α5	α1, β1, δ, γ, ε

- α genes: CHRNA1 (muscle), CHRNA2 (neuronal), CHRNA3, CHRNA4, CHRNA5, CHRNA6, CHRNA7, CHRNA8, CHRNA9, CHRNA10
- β genes: CHRNB1 (muscle), CHRNB2 (neuronal), CHRNB3, CHRNB4
- Other genes: CHRND (delta), CHRNE (epsilon), CHRNG (gamma)

Neuronal nAChRs are transmembrane proteins that form pentameric structures assembled from a family of subunits composed of α_{2}–α_{10} and β_{2}–β_{4}. These subunits were discovered from the mid-1980s through the early 1990s, when cDNAs for multiple nAChR subunits were cloned from rat and chicken brains, leading to the identification of eleven different genes (twelve in chickens) that code for neuronal nAChR subunits; The subunit genes identified were named α_{2}–α_{10} (α_{8} only found in chickens) and β_{2}–β_{4}. It has also been discovered that various subunit combinations could form functional nAChRs that could be activated by acetylcholine and nicotine, and the different combinations of subunits generate subtypes of nAChRs with diverse functional and pharmacological properties. When expressed alone, α_{7}, α_{8}, α_{9}, and α_{10} are able to form functional receptors, but other α subunits require the presence of β subunits to form functional receptors. In mammals, nAchR subunits have been found to be encoded by 17 genes, and of these, nine genes encoding α-subunits and three encoding β-subunits are expressed in the brain. β_{2} subunit-containing nAChRs (β_{2}nAChRs) and α_{7}nAChRs are widely expressed in the brain, whereas other nAChR subunits have more restricted expression. The pentameric assembly of nAChRs is subjected to the subunits that are produced in various cell types such as in the human lung where epithelial and muscular pentamers largely differ.

=== CHRNA5/A3/B4 ===
An important nAchR gene cluster (CHRNA5/A3/B4) contains the genes encoding for the α_{5}, α3 and β_{4} subunits. Genetic studies have identified single nucleotide polymorphisms (SNPs) in the chromosomal locus encoding these three nAChR genes as risk factors for nicotine dependence, lung cancer, chronic obstructive pulmonary disease, alcoholism, and peripheral arterial disease. The CHRNA5/A3/B4 nAChR subunit genes are found in a tight cluster in chromosomal region 15q24–25. The nAChR subunits encoded by this locus form the predominant nicotinic receptor subtypes expressed in the peripheral nervous system (PNS) and other key central nervous system (CNS) sites, such as the medial habenula, a structure between the limbic forebrain and midbrain involved in major cholinergic circuitry pathways. Further research of the CHRNA5/A3/B4 genes have revealed that "neuronal" nAChR genes are also expressed in non-neuronal cells where they are involved in various fundamental processes, such as inflammation. The CHRNA5/A3/B4 genes are co-expressed in many cell types and the transcriptional activities of the promoter regions of the three genes are regulated by many of the same transcription factors, demonstrating that their clustering may reflect control of gene expression.

=== CHRNA6/CHRNB3 ===
CHRNB3 and CHRNA6 are also grouped in a gene cluster, located on 8p11. Multiple studies have shown that SNPS in the CHRNB3–CHRNA6 have been linked to nicotine dependence and smoking behavior, such as two SNPs in CHRNB3, rs6474413 and rs10958726. Genetic variation in this region also displays influence susceptibility to use drugs of abuse, including cocaine and alcohol consumption. Nicotinic receptors containing α_{6} or β_{3} subunits expressed in brain regions, especially in the ventral tegmental area and substantia nigra, are important for drug behaviors due to their role in dopamine release. Genetic variation in these genes can alter sensitivity to drugs of abuse in numerous ways, including changing the amino acid structure of the protein or cause alterations in transcriptional and translational regulation.

=== CHRNA4/CHRNB2 ===
Other well studied nAChR genes include the CHRNA4 and CHRNB2, which have been associated as Autosomal Dominant Nocturnal Frontal Lobe Epilepsy (ADNFLE) genes. Both of these nAChR subunits are present in the brain and the occurrence of mutations in these two subunits cause a focal type of epilepsy. Examples include the CHRNA4 insertion mutation 776ins3 that is associated with nocturnal seizures and psychiatric disorders, and the CHRNB2 mutation I312M that seems to cause not only epilepsy but also very specific cognitive deficits, such as deficits in learning and memory. There is naturally occurring genetic variation between these two genes and analysis of single nucleotide polymorphisms (SNPs) and other gene modifications show a higher variation in the CHRNA4 gene than in the CHRNB2 gene, implying that nAChR β_{2}, the protein encoded by CHRNB2, associates with more subunits than α_{4}. CHRNA2 has also been reported as a third candidate for nocturnal frontal lobe seizures.

=== CHRNA7 ===
Several studies have reported an association between CHRNA7 and endophenotypes of psychiatric disorders and nicotine dependence, contributing to the significant clinical relevance of α_{7} and research being done on it. CHRNA7 was one of the first genes that had been considered to be involved with schizophrenia. Studies identified several CHRNA7 promoter polymorphisms that reduce the genes transcriptional activity to be associated with schizophrenia, which is consistent with the finding of reduced levels of a7 nAChRs in the brain of schizophrenic patients. Both nAChRs subtypes, α_{4}β_{2} and α_{7}, have been found to be significantly reduced in post-mortem studies of individuals with schizophrenia. Additionally, smoking rates are significantly higher in those with schizophrenia, implying that smoking nicotine may be a form of self-medicating. CHRNA7 has also been shown to modulate immune responses though cholinergic anti-inflammatory pathway (CAP).

=== Notable variations ===
Nicotinic receptors are pentamers of these subunits; i.e., each receptor contains five subunits. Thus, there is immense potential of variation of these subunits, some of which are more commonly found than others. The most broadly expressed subtypes include (α_{1})_{2}β_{1}δε (adult muscle-type), (α_{3})_{2}(β_{4})_{3} (ganglion-type), (α_{4})_{2}(β_{2})_{3} (CNS-type) and (α_{7})_{5} (another CNS-type). A comparison follows:

Receptor-type	Location	Effect; functions	Nicotinic agonists	Nicotinic antagonists
Muscle-type: (α_{1})_{2}β_{1}δε or (α_{1})_{2}β_{1}δγ	Neuromuscular junction	EPSP, mainly by increased Na^{+} and K^{+} permeability	acetylcholine; carbachol; suxamethonium (succinylcholine); decamethonium; pyrantel	α-bungarotoxin; α-conotoxin; tubocurarine; pancuronium; atracurium*
Ganglion-type: (α_{3})_{2}(β_{4})_{3}	autonomic ganglia	EPSP, mainly by increased Na^{+} and K^{+} permeability	acetylcholine; carbachol; nicotine; epibatidine; dimethylphenylpiperazinium	bupropion; coniine; 18-methoxycoronaridine; Dextromethorphan; hexamethonium; ibogaine; mecamylamine; trimetaphan
Heteromeric CNS-type: (α_{4})_{2}(β_{2})_{3}	Brain	Post- and presynaptic excitation, mainly by increased Na^{+} and K^{+} permeability. Major subtype involved in the attention-enhancing and rewarding effects of nicotine as well as the pathophysiology of nicotine addiction.	acetylcholine; cytisine; epibatidine; nicotine; nifene; varenicline	α-conotoxin; Dextromethorphan; dihydro-β-erythroidine; mecamylamine; bupropion
Further CNS-type: (α_{3})_{2}(β_{4})_{3}	Brain	Post- and presynaptic excitation	acetylcholine; cytisine; epibatidine; nicotine	Dextromethorphan; hexamethonium; mecamylamine; tubocurarine; bupropion
Homomeric CNS-type: (α_{7})_{5}	Brain	Post- and presynaptic excitation, mainly by increased Na^{+}, K^{+} and Ca^{2+} permeability. Major subtype involved in some of the cognitive effects of nicotine. Moreover, activation of (α_{7})_{5} could improve neurovascular coupling response in neurodegenerative disease and neurogenesis in ischemic stroke. Also involved in the pro-angiogenic effects of nicotine and accelerate the progression of chronic kidney disease in smokers.	acetylcholine; choline; nicotine; Cytisine; epibatidine; dimethylphenylpiperazinium; varenicline	α-bungarotoxin; amantadine; Dextromethorphan; mecamylamine; memantine; methylcaconitine

== Modulators ==
Various drugs are ligands and modulators of nicotinic acetylcholine receptors. Examples include nicotinic agonists like nicotine, nicotinic antagonists like tubocurarine and mecamylamine, and nicotinic negative allosteric modulators like bupropion.

== See also ==
- Bupropion
- Muscarinic agonist
- Muscarinic antagonist
- TDBzcholine
- Myasthenia gravis
- Congenital myasthenic syndrome
- Adrenergic
- Adrenergic receptor
