= Interpeduncular nucleus =

Region of the brain

Details
- Parts: Apical subnucleus (IPA), Central subnucleus (IPC), Dorsolateral subnucleus (IPDL)x2, Dorsomedial subnucleus (IPDM)x2, Intermediate subnucleus (IPI)x2, Lateral subnucleus (IPL)x2, Rostral subnucleus (IPR)

Identifiers
- Latin: nucleus interpeduncularis
- MeSH: D066268
- NeuroNames: 522
- NeuroLex ID: birnlex_1000
- TA98: A14.1.06.313
- TA2: 5897
- FMA: 72439

The interpeduncular nucleus (IPN) is an unpaired, ovoid group of neurons at the base of the midbrain tegmentum. In the midbrain it lies below the interpeduncular fossa. As the name suggests, the interpeduncular nucleus lies in between the cerebral peduncles.

== Composition ==
The Interpeduncular nucleus is primarily GABAergic and contains at least two neuron clusters of different morphologies. The region is divided into 7 paired and unpaired subnuclei

=== Subdivisions ===
The presence of non-homologous subdivisions of the Interpeduncular nucleus was first noticed by Cajal over a hundred years ago. The currently recognized standard subdivision notation was mostly established by Hammill and Lenn in 1984 by combining the work and notations of four groups. Although most of their proposed convention stuck, at some point the proposed "rostral lateral" sub-nucleus was renamed "dorsomedial" and became immortalized in brain atlases.

- Apical sub-nucleus (IPA)

Unpaired sub-nucleus. Former names include: "caudal dorsal", "dorsal", and "pars dorsalis magnocellularis".

- Central sub-nucleus (IPC)

Unpaired sub-nucleus. Former names include: "rostral ventral", "caudal central", "posterior inter", and "pars medianus".

- Dorsolateral sub-nucleus (IPDL)

Paired sub-nucleus.

- Dorsomedial sub-nucleus (IPDM)

Paired sub-nucleus. Former names include: "rostral lateral" and "interstitial".

- Intermediate sub-nucleus (IPI)

Paired sub-nucleus. Former names include: "caudal intermediate", "posterior inner" and "pars medianus".

- Lateral sub-nucleus (IPL)

Paired sub-nucleus. Former names include: "caudal lateral", "paramedian" and "pars lateralis".

- Rostral sub-nucleus (IPR)

Unpaired sub-nucleus. Former names include: "central" and "pars dorsalis".

== Inputs ==
The major input to the IPN arrives via the fasciculus retroflex from the medial habenula. This pathway presents the IPN with several excitatory neurotransmitters including ACh and Substance P. Other brain regions that project to the Interpeduncular nucleus include: the Nucleus of diagonal band, the dorsal Tegmentum, the Raphe nuclei, the Central grey, and the Locus coeruleus.

== Outputs ==
The major output pathways are inhibitory and project to the dorsal Tegmental area, the Periaqueductal gray and also the Raphe nuclei. In addition, output is sent to the following: the mediodorsal nucleus of the Thalamus, the lateral Habenula, the Septal nuclei, the anterior Mammillary nuclei, the Nucleus of diagonal band, the Preoptic area, the Ventral tegmental area, and in some species the dorsal and/or lateral Hypothalamus.

== Function ==
The Interpeduncular nucleus is thought to have a broad inhibitory effects on many other brain regions. IPN activity is linked with decreased dopamine release and utilization from dopamine producing regions. The Interpeduncular nucleus is implicated with a role in the regulation of Rapid eye movement sleep. Activation of the GAD2 expressing sub-population of the IPN produced the physical symptoms of nicotine withdrawal suggesting that the misfunction of this region may be an active component of withdrawal.

== See also ==
- Regions in the human brain
