= Pyridine alkaloids =

Class of chemical compounds

Pyridine, the parent compound of the pyridine alkaloids.

Pyridine alkaloids are a class of alkaloids (a broad group of nitrogen-containing chemical compounds found in a wide range of plants and some animals) that contain a pyridine ring. Examples include nicotine, nornicotine, anatabine and anabasine - all of which are found at different concerns in varying proportions in plants of the genus Nicotiana including tobacco.

Alkaloids with a pyridine partial structure are usually further subdivided according to their occurrence and their biogenetic origin. The most important examples of pyridine alkaloids are the nicotine and anabasine, which are found in tobacco, the areca alkaloids in betel and ricinine in castor oil.

Nicotine

Anabasine

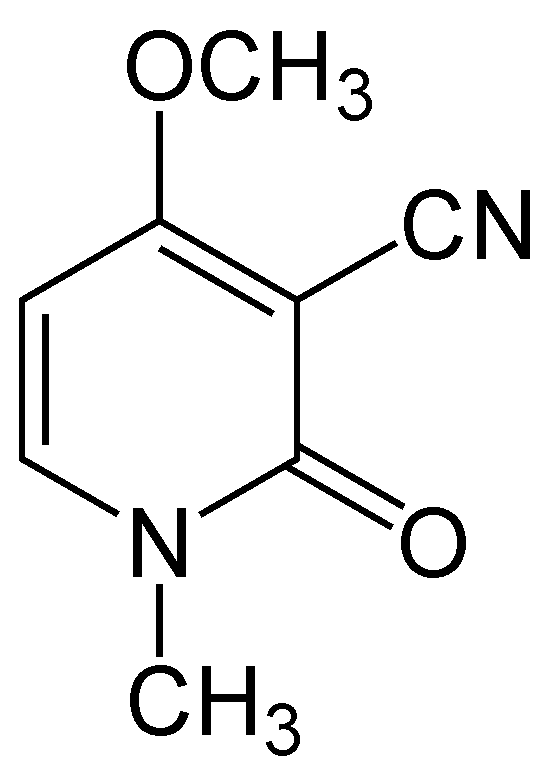
Ricinine
