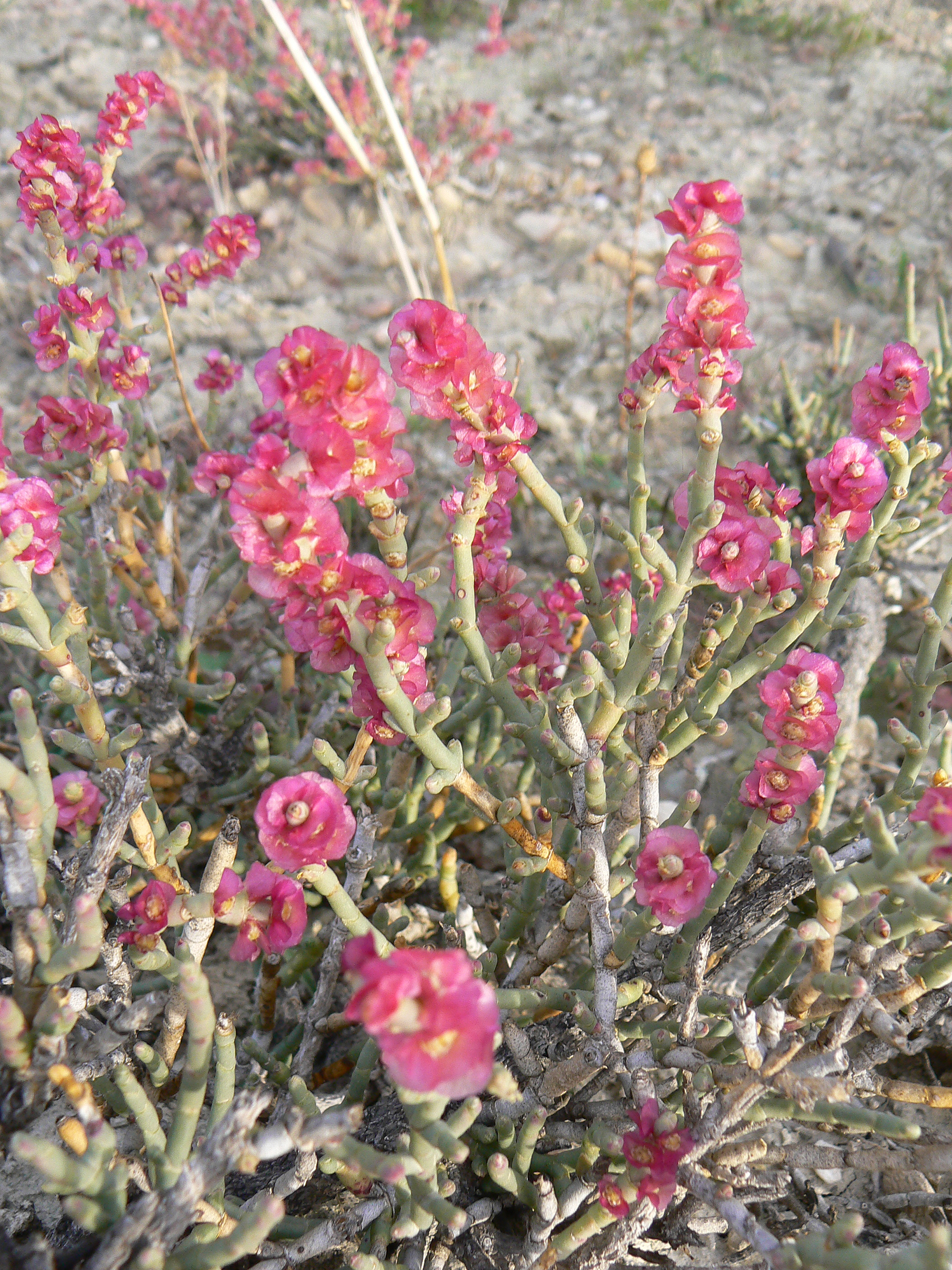
- Anabasis articulata, fruiting

Scientific classification
- Kingdom: Plantae
- Clade: Embryophytes
- Clade: Tracheophytes
- Clade: Spermatophytes
- Clade: Angiosperms
- Clade: Eudicots
- Order: Caryophyllales
- Family: Amaranthaceae
- Subfamily: Salsoloideae
- Tribe: Salsoleae
- Genus: Anabasis; L.

Species
- 29 species, see text

Synonyms
- Brachylepis C.A.Meyer; Esfandiaria Sharif & Aellen; Fredolia (Coss. & Durieu ex Bunge) Ulbr.

= Anabasis (plant) =

Genus of plants

Anabasis is a genus of plants in the subfamily Salsoloideae of the family Amaranthaceae. It is distributed in southern Europe, North Africa, and Asia.

== Description ==
The species of genus Anabasis are annual or perennial herbs or subshrubs. Their stems are fleshy and articulated, mostly glabrous with the exception of hairy tufts at the nodes, rarely with papillae-like trichomes or woolly. The opposite leaves may be reduced to small scales or normally developed.

The inflorescences are elongated or condensed spikes. The flowers sit solitary or in groups of up to 4 in the axils of upper leaves (bracts), with 2 paired bracteoles. Flowers consist of 5 subequal membranous perianth segments, that are free nearly from base; 3-5 stamens without appendages; and an ovary with 2-3 thick and short stigmas.

In fruit, prominent membranous wings develop on the back of the perianth segments, usually 2-3 of them larger than the others. Rarely, the perianth remains unwinged. The fruit may be baccate or dry, either vertical and compressed or nearly spherically shaped. The lenticular seed is vertically orientated, filled by the spiral embryo without endosperm.

== Distribution ==
The genus Anabasis is distributed from Southwest Europe and North Africa, the shores of the Red Sea (Ethiopia) to Southwest Asia and Central Asia. The center of diversity lies in Asia. Anabasis species grow in steppes and semideserts.

== Systematics ==
The genus name Anabasis was published in 1753 by Carl von Linné in Species Plantarum. Type species is Anabasis aphylla L.

The genus Anabasis belongs to the tribe Salsoleae s.s., in the subfamily Salsoloideae of the family Amaranthaceae (which includes the family Chenopodiaceae). According to Akhani et al. (2007), the genus comprises 29 species:

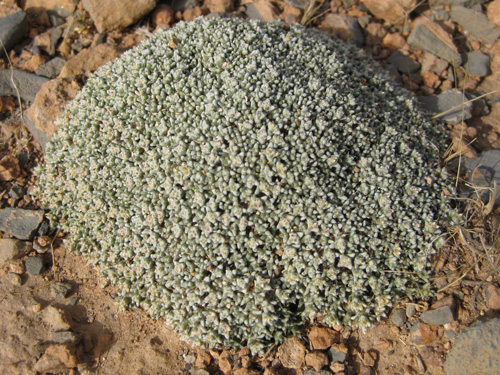
Anabasis aretioides

- Anabasis aphylla L.
- Anabasis aretioides Moq. & Coss. (Syn. Fredolia aretioides (Moq. & Coss. ex Bunge) Ulbr.)
- Anabasis articulata (Forssk.) Moq.
- Anabasis brevifolia C. A. Mey.
- Anabasis brachiata Fisch. & C. A. Mey.
- Anabasis calcarea (Charif & Aellen) Bokhari & Wendelbo
- Anabasis cretacea Pall.
- Anabasis ebracteolata Korov. ex Botsch.
- Anabasis ehrenbergii Schweinf. ex Boiss.
- Anabasis elatior (C. A. Mey.) Schrenk
- Anabasis eriopoda (Schrenk) Benth. ex Volkens
- Anabasis eugeniae Iljin
- Anabasis ferganica Drob.
- Anabasis gypsicola Iljin
- Anabasis haussknechtii Bunge ex Boiss.
- Anabasis iranica Iljin
- Anabasis jaxartica (Bunge) Benth. ex Volkens
- Anabasis lachnantha Aellen & Rech. f.
- Anabasis macroptera Moq.
- Anabasis oropediorum Maire
- Anabasis paucifolia M. Pop. ex Iljin
- Anabasis pelliotii Danguy
- Anabasis prostrata Pomel.
- Anabasis salsa (C. A. Mey.) Benth. ex Volkens
- Anabasis syriaca Iljin
- Anabasis tianschanica Botsch.
- Anabasis truncata (Schrenk) Bunge
- Anabasis turgaica Iljin & Krasch.
- Anabasis turkestanica Iljin & Korov.

== Chemistry ==
The Nicotine-related alkaloid Anabasine was named for the toxic Central Asiatic species Anabasis aphylla - from which it was first isolated by Orechoff and Menschikoff in the year 1931. It was widely used as an insecticide in the former Soviet Union until 1970. Anabasine is also the active principle responsible for deaths from poisoning caused by the leaves of Nicotiana glauca, the tree tobacco.
