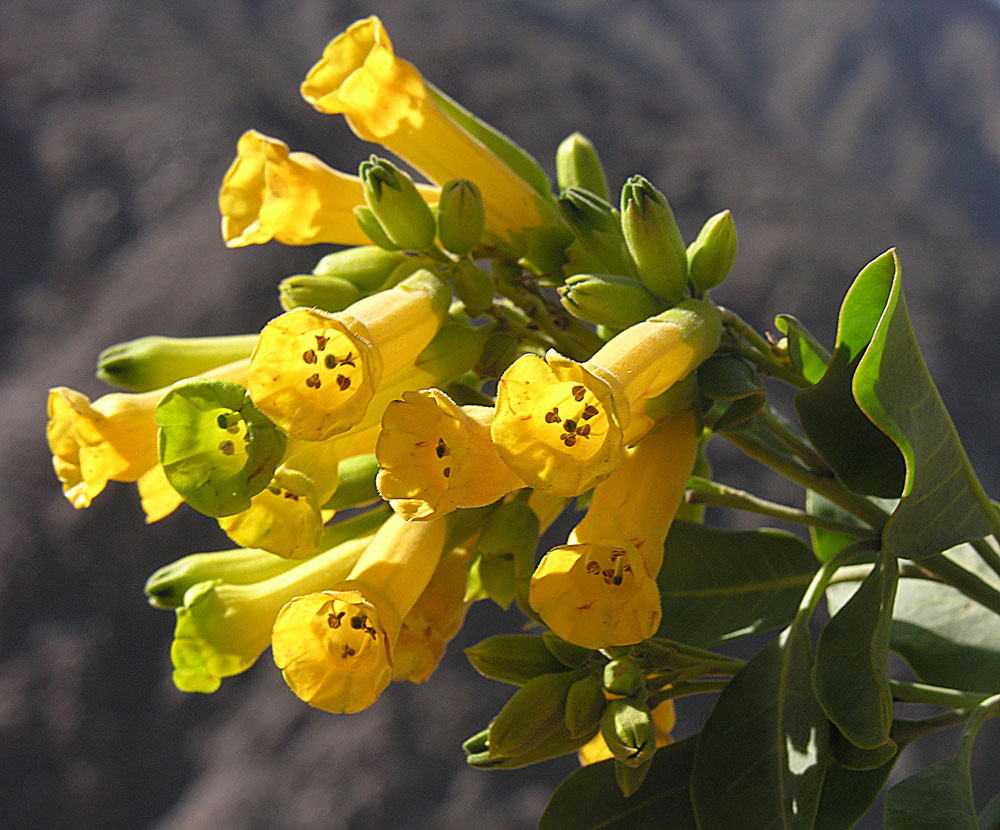

Scientific classification
- Kingdom: Plantae
- Clade: Embryophytes
- Clade: Tracheophytes
- Clade: Angiosperms
- Clade: Eudicots
- Clade: Asterids
- Order: Solanales
- Family: Solanaceae
- Genus: Nicotiana
- Species: N. glauca

Binomial name
- Nicotiana glauca Graham

Synonyms
- Nicotidendron glauca (Graham) Griseb.; Nicotiana glauca f. lateritia Lillo; Nicotiana glauca var. angustifolia Comes; Nicotiana glauca var. decurrens Comes; Nicotiana glauca var. grandiflora Comes; Siphaulax glabra Raf.

= Nicotiana glauca =

Species of plant

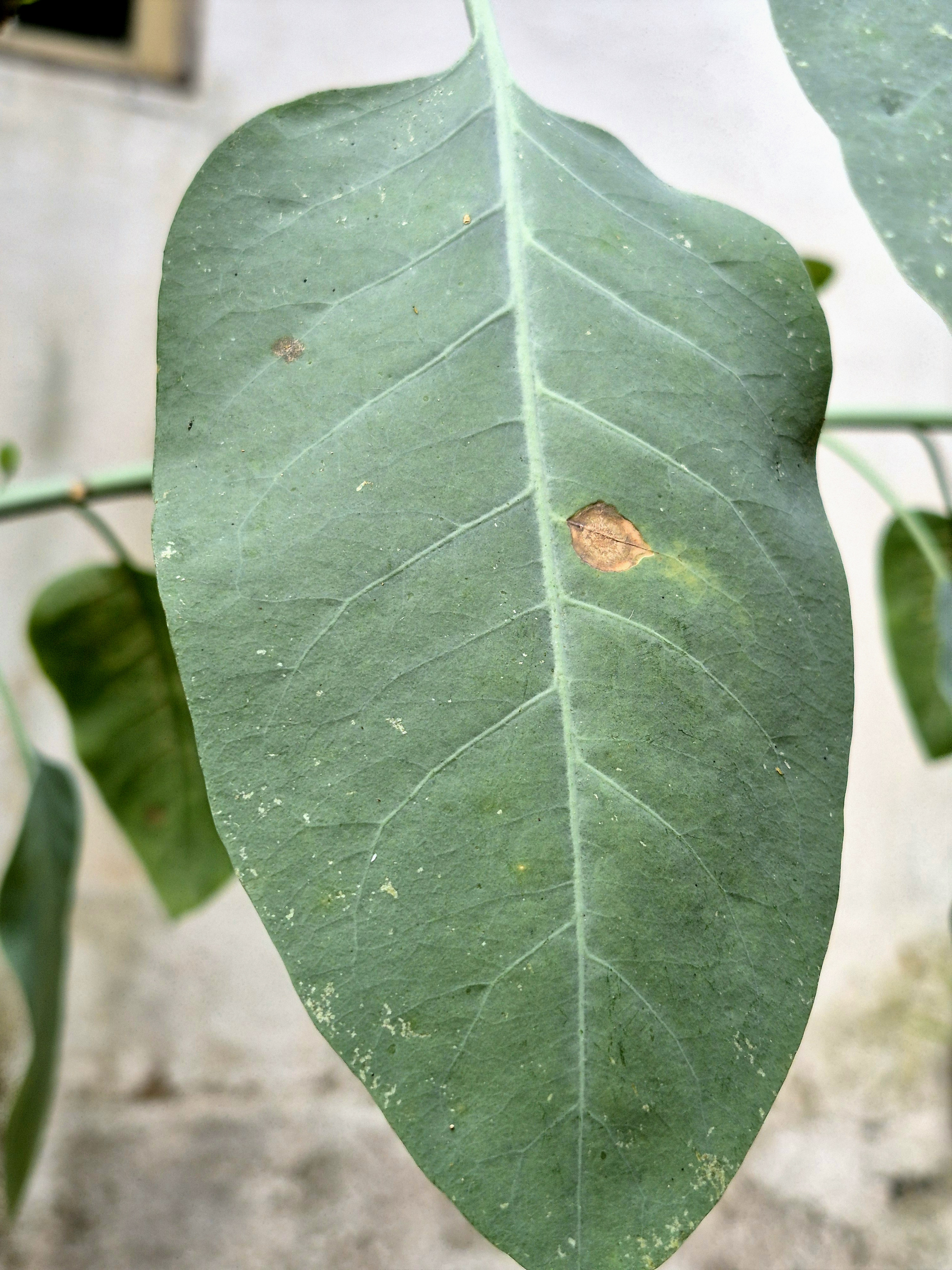
N. glauca leaf

Nicotiana glauca is a species of flowering plant in the tobacco genus Nicotiana of the nightshade family Solanaceae. It is known by the common name tree tobacco. Its leaves are attached to the stalk by petioles (many other Nicotiana species have sessile leaves), and its leaves and stems are neither pubescent nor sticky like Nicotiana tabacum. It resembles Cestrum parqui but differs in the form of leaves and fusion of the outer floral parts. It grows to heights of more than two meters.

Tree tobacco is native to South America but it is now widespread as an introduced species on other continents. It is a common roadside weed in the southwestern United States, and an invasive plant species in California native plant habitats.

== Description ==
Nicotiana glauca is a small tree or shrub with many branches that normally grows to over 2 m, but can reach as high as 7 m. Its ample leaves can be up to 20 cm long, oval-shaped, bluish-green in color with a thick and rubbery texture. It has yellow to greenish-yellow tubular flowers about 5 cm long and 1 cm wide, growing loosely at the ends of branches. The plant primarily reproduces by seed.

== Ecology ==
Nicotiana glauca can pose a threat to native species by outcompeting them for resources and is classified as an invasive species in many parts of the world. In some management programmes, the beetle Malabris aculeata has been successfully deployed as a biological control agent. Every part of the plant is potentially poisonous to humans and livestock.

== Distribution ==
It is originally native to South America (including Colombia, Argentina, Chile, Paraguay, Uruguay, Brazil, Venezuela, Bolivia, Peru, and Ecuador), but has been naturalized globally. It is found in Australia, warmer parts of Europe, temperate Asia, Canarian Archipelago, New Zealand, the United States, Mexico, Hawaii, and Sub-Saharan Africa (including Kenya and Tanzania, where it is invasive, as well as Uganda).

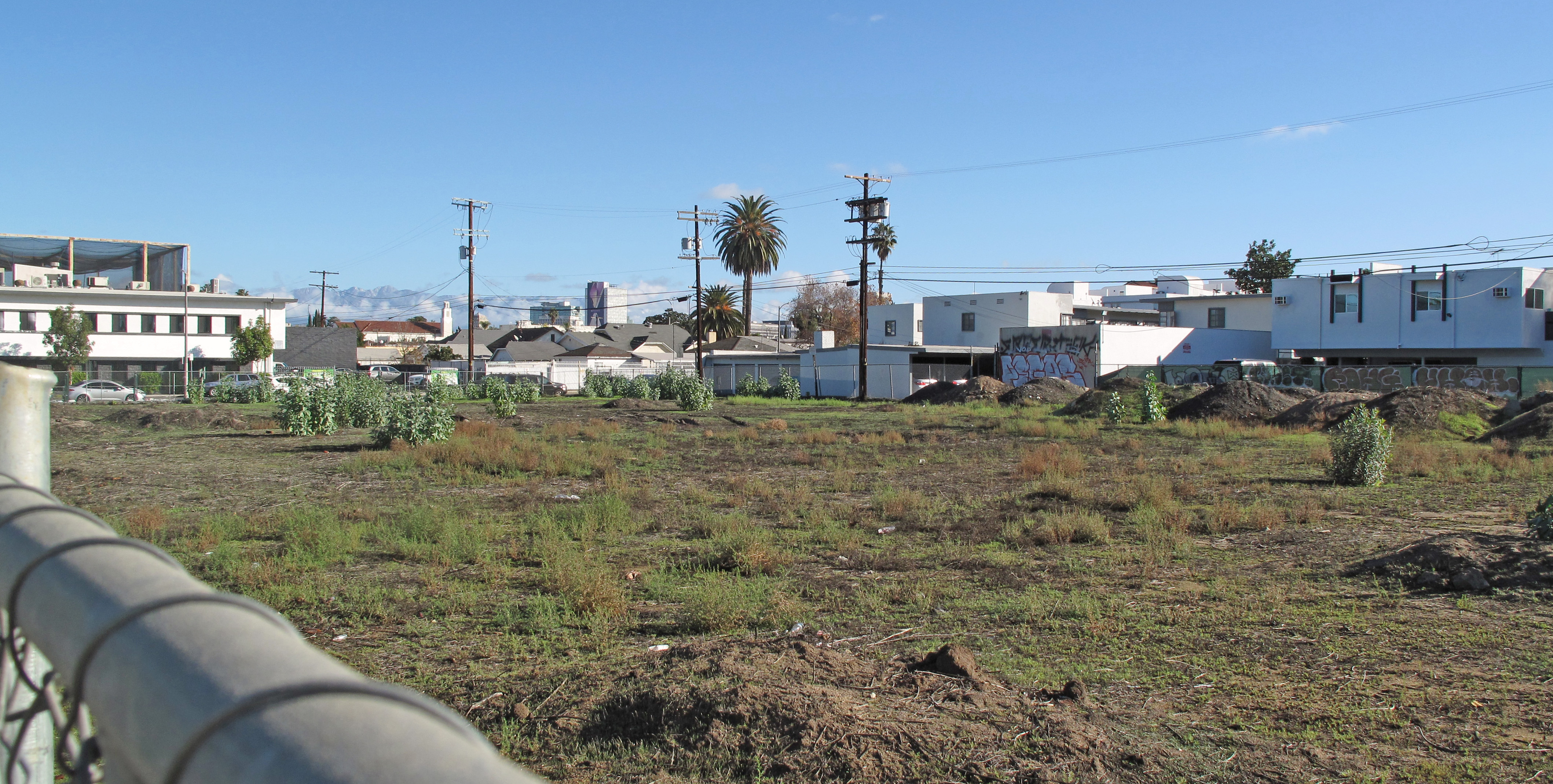
Vacant lot in Los Angeles with Nicotiana glauca plants.

It grows in a wide variety of open and disturbed habitats including lakeshores and roadsides, but is mainly a problem in relatively dry areas. In California, it is described as growing especially in disturbed areas and along stream beds; it is believed to have been introduced to the region by Spanish missionaries from South America either via imported grain or deliberately as a source of smoking tobacco.

== Names ==
The plant is commonly known in English as tree tobacco, Brazilian tree tobacco, shrub tobacco, wild tobacco, tobacco tree, tobacco bush, tobacco plant, and mustard tree.

In Spanish and throughout Latin America, it is known by many names, including tabaco moro ("Moorish tobacco"), palancho, and palán palán.

Its botanical name, Nicotiana glauca, was given to it in 1828 by Robert Graham. The genus is named after Jean Nicot (c. 1530 – 1604), a French ambassador to Portugal, who sent tobacco seeds and powdered leaves from Lisbon to France. Glauca is derived from Greek, meaning "bluish-gray" and refers to the color of its leaves.

== Phylogeny ==
There are around 76 species in the Nicotiana genus, the sole member of the Nicotianeae tribe. Phylogenetic research suggests the following species are closely related:

- - N. acaulis Speg.
  - - N. glauca Graham
    - - N. noctiflora Hook.
      - N. petunioides (Griseb.) Millán

== Uses ==
The plant is used for a variety of medicinal purposes by Native American groups. The Cahuilla people used leaves interchangeably with other tobacco species in religious rituals and as a poultice to treat swellings, bruises, cuts, wounds, boils, sores, inflamed throat, and swollen glands. It is poisonous to consume either cooked or raw. It contains high doses of the alkaloids anabasine and nicotine such that ingestion of the leaves can be fatal. It is being investigated for use as a biofuel.
