= Ricinine nitrilase =

Class of enzymes

Identifiers
- EC no.: 3.5.5.2
- CAS no.: 9075-40-5

Databases
- BRENDA: enzyme data
- ExPASy: NiceZyme view
- KEGG: enzyme entry
- MetaCyc: metabolic pathway
- Rhea: reactions
- PDB structures: RCSB PDB PDBe PDBsum
- Gene Ontology: AmiGO / QuickGO
Search
- PMC: articles
- PubMed: articles
- NCBI: proteins

Ricinine nitrilase (EC 3.5.5.2) is an enzyme characterised from a soil bacterium that catalyzes the hydrolysis of the toxic alkaloid, ricine, to 3-carboxy-4-methoxy-N-methyl-2-pyridone and ammonia:

ricinine
2 H_{2}O
NH_{3}
3-carboxy-4-methoxy-N-methyl-2-pyridone

This enzyme is a hydrolase, one acting on carbon-nitrogen bonds other than peptide bonds, specifically in nitriles. The systematic name of this enzyme class is ricinine aminohydrolase.
