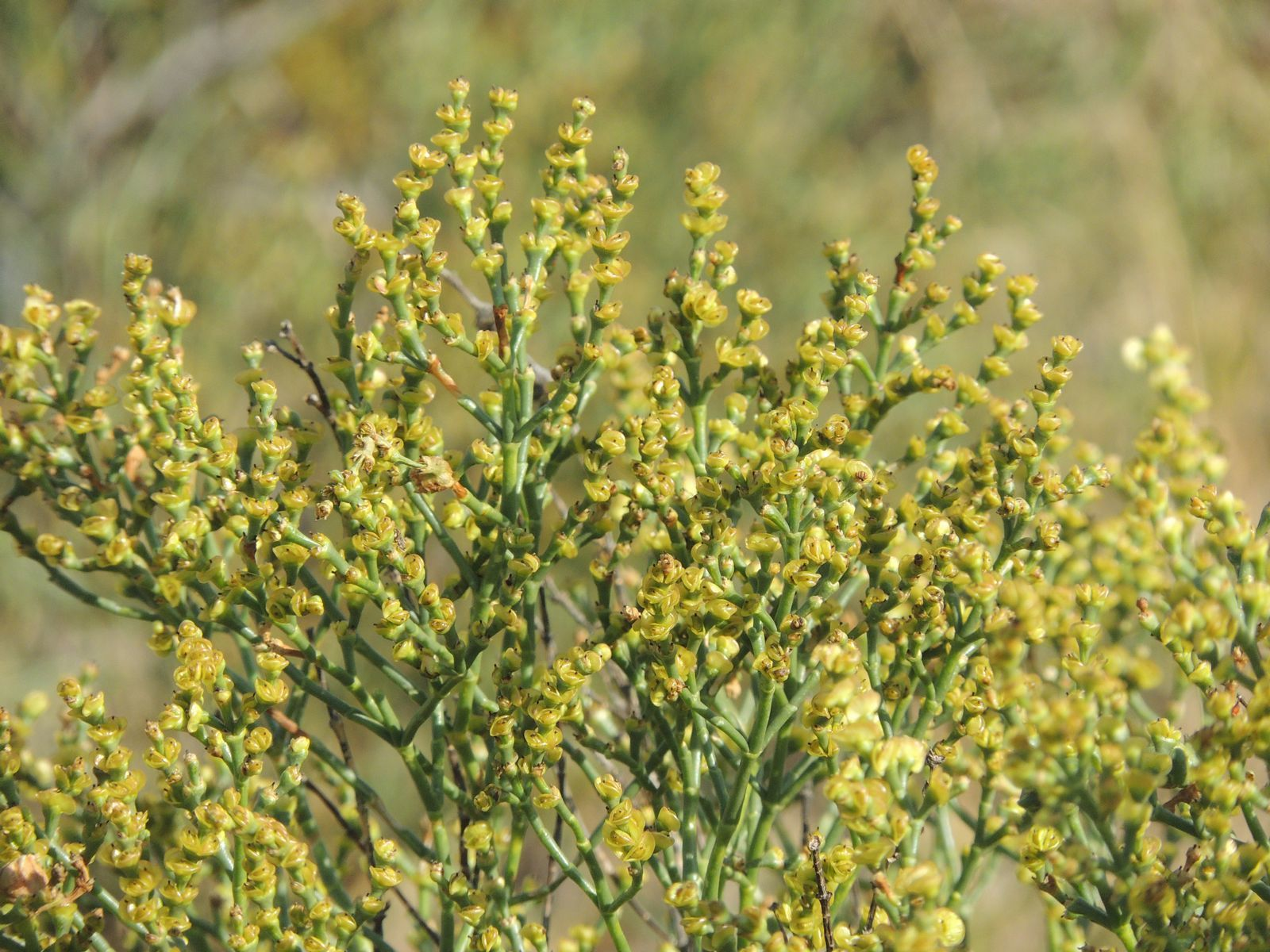

Scientific classification
- Kingdom: Plantae
- Clade: Embryophytes
- Clade: Tracheophytes
- Clade: Spermatophytes
- Clade: Angiosperms
- Clade: Eudicots
- Order: Caryophyllales
- Family: Amaranthaceae
- Genus: Anabasis
- Species: A. aphylla

Binomial name
- Anabasis aphylla L.

Synonyms
- Anabasis tatarica Pall.

= Anabasis aphylla =

Species of plant in the amaranth family

Anabasis aphylla is a species of flowering plant in the family Amaranthaceae, native to the region surrounding the Caspian Sea, Central Asia, and Xinjiang and western Gansu provinces of China. A many-branched shrub usually found growing in alluvial fans and dune swales, it is sometimes planted to catch blowing soil and stabilize sand dunes. The alkaloid anabasine was named for this toxic species, from which it was first isolated by Orechoff and Menschikoff in the year 1931. Anabasine was widely used as an insecticide in the former Soviet Union until 1970.

Anabaseine and anabasamine are other alkaloids found to exist in the plant.
