= Scrobipalpa gecko =

Scientific classification
- Domain: Eukaryota
- Kingdom: Animalia
- Phylum: Arthropoda
- Class: Insecta
- Order: Lepidoptera
- Family: Gelechiidae
- Genus: Scrobipalpa
- Species: S. gecko

Binomial name
- Scrobipalpa gecko (Walsingham, 1911)

Synonyms
- Lita gecko Walsingham, 1911

Species of moth

Scrobipalpa gecko is a moth in the family Gelechiidae. It was described by Walsingham in 1911. It is found in Algeria, Tunisia, southern Greece and the Middle East.

The wingspan is 8–11 mm (0.31–0.43 in). The forewings are white, sprinkled with black scales which are assembled in a reduplicated spot close to the base, a spot on the fold a little beyond it, a costal spot at one-fourth attenuated downward to the fold, an indistinct shade-band across the middle, not reaching the dorsum, and beyond this a profuse sprinkling along the costa and around the apex and termen, also through the hoary white cilia. In a small spot at the apex are a few ferruginous scales and two larger ferruginous spots are found, one before and one beyond the middle, the first slightly crossing the fold, the second at the end of the cell, these are both somewhat sprinkled with black. The hindwings are silvery bluish white.

The larvae feed on Anabasis articulata.
