= C19H20N2O2 =

The molecular formula C_{19}H_{20}N_{2}O_{2} (molar mass: 308.37 g/mol, exact mass: 308.1525 u) may refer to:

- Phenylbutazone
- GTS-21 (DMXBA)
