= Anabasis eugeniae =

Eugenia's anabasis

Conservation status
- Vulnerable (IUCN 3.1)

Scientific classification
- Kingdom: Plantae
- Clade: Tracheophytes
- Clade: Angiosperms
- Clade: Eudicots
- Order: Caryophyllales
- Family: Amaranthaceae
- Genus: Anabasis
- Species: A. eugeniae

Binomial name
- Anabasis eugeniae Iljin

Species of flowering plant

Anabasis eugeniae, or Eugenia's anabasis, is a species of flowering plant in the family Amaranthaceae. It is endemic to the Nakhchivan Autonomous Republic in Azerbaijan, and is only known from the Julfa and Ordubad districts. It can be found on clay soils containing gypsum. It is threatened by overgrazing.
