= Anabaseine =

- Chemical Structure of anabaseine

Names
- Preferred IUPAC name 3,4,5,6-Tetrahydro-2,3′-bipyridine

Identifiers
CAS Number	3471-05-4
3D model (JSmol)	Interactive image
ChEBI	CHEBI:80787
ChemSpider	17923
IUPHAR/BPS	347
KEGG	C06522
PubChem CID	18985
UNII	DYE103K23I
CompTox Dashboard (EPA)	DTXSID50188266
- InChI: InChI=1S/C10H12N2/c1-2-7-12-10(5-1)9-4-3-6-11-8-9/h3-4,6,8H,1-2,5,7H2 Key: AUBPMADJYNSPOA-UHFFFAOYSA-N
- SMILES: C1CCC(=NC1)c1cccnc1

Properties
Chemical formula	C_{10}H_{12}N_{2}
Molar mass	160.220 g·mol^{−1}
Appearance	Oil
Odor	Odorless
Boiling point	110-120°C
- Except where otherwise noted, data are given for materials in their standard state (at 25 °C [77 °F], 100 kPa). verify (what is ?) Infobox references

Anabaseine (3,4,5,6-tetrahydro-2,3′-bipyridine) is an alkaloid toxin produced by Nemertines worms and Aphaenogaster ants. It is structurally similar to nicotine and anabasine. Similarly, it has been shown to act as an agonist on most nicotinic acetylcholine receptors in the central nervous system and peripheral nervous system.

== Mechanism of action ==
The iminium form of anabaseine binds to most nicotinic acetylcholine receptors in both the peripheral nervous system and central nervous system. But, there is a higher binding affinity for receptors in the brain with a α7 subunit, as well as skeletal muscle receptors. Binding causes the depolarization of neurons, and induces the release of both dopamine and norepinephrine.

== Biological effects ==
Anabaseine causes paralysis in crustaceans and insects, but not in vertebrates, presumably by acting as an agonist on peripheral neuromuscular nicotinic acetylcholine receptors.

== Structure ==
The anabaseine molecule consists of a non-aromatic tetrahydropyridine ring connected to the 3rd carbon of a 3-pyridyl ring. It can exist in three forms at physiological pH: a ketone, imine, or iminium structure. Due to conjugation between the imine and 3-pyridyl ring, anabaseine exists as a nearly coplanar molecule.

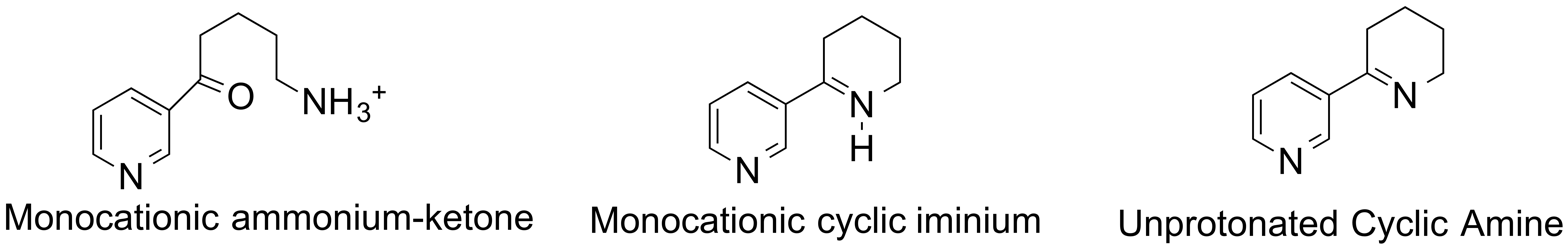
Structures of Anabaseine at Physiological pH

== Synthesis ==
Spath and Mamoli first synthesized anabaseine in 1936. The researchers reacted benzoic anhydride with δ-valerolactam to yield N-benzoylpiperidone. Then, N-benzoylpiperidone is reacted with nicotinic acid ethyl ester to produce α-nicotinoyl-N-benzoyl-2-piperidone. This product then is decarboxylated, undergoes ring closure, and amide hydrolysis to form anabaseine.

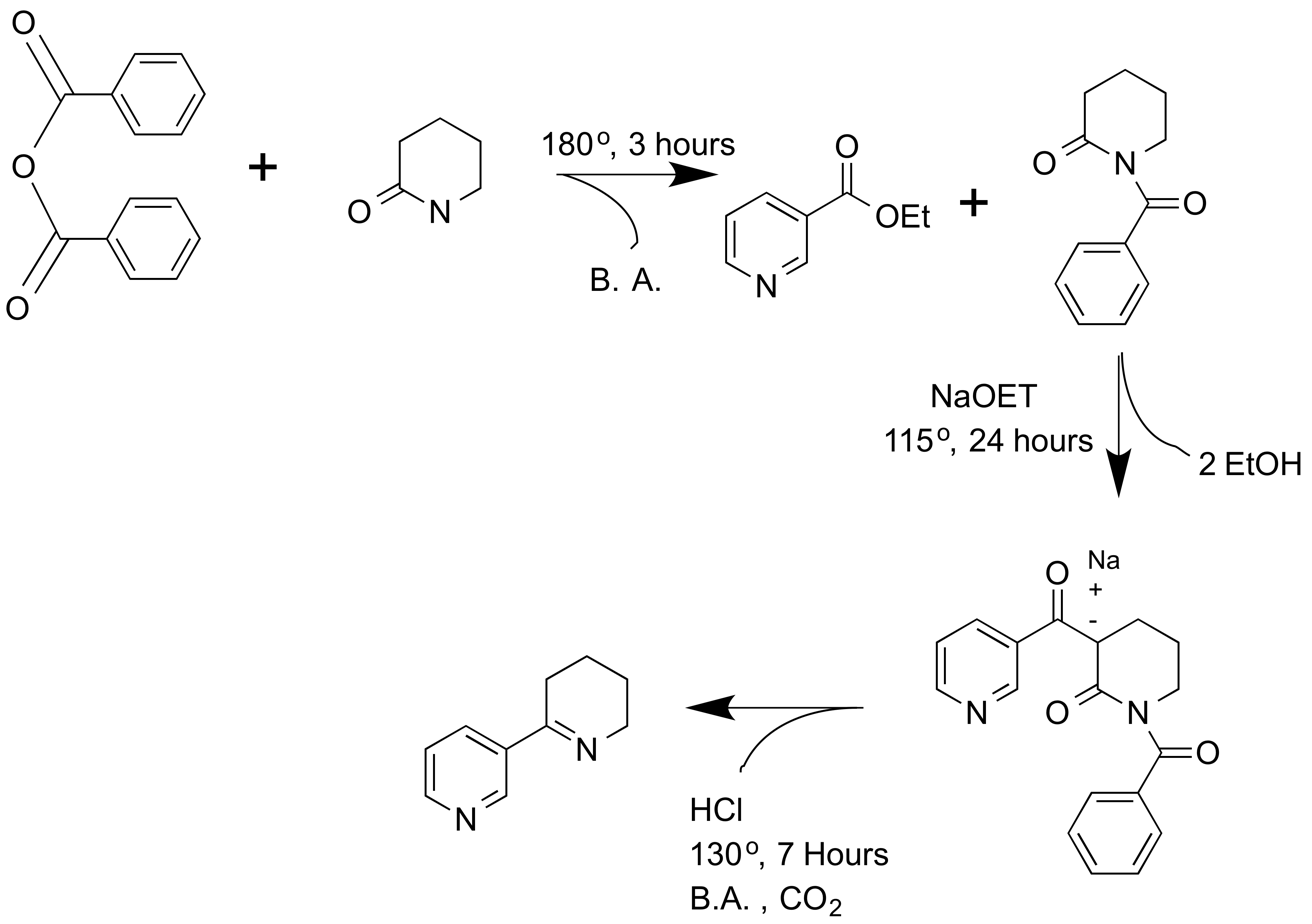
Synthesis of Anabaseine

Additional synthetic strategies have since been developed by Bloom, Zoltewicz, Smith, and Villemin.

== Derivatives ==
Due to anabaseine's fairly non-specific binding to nicotinic acetylcholine receptors, the molecule was largely discarded as a useful tool in research or medicine. However, anabaseine derivatives have been identified with a more selective α7 binding profile. One such derivative (GTS-21, 3-(2,4-dimethoxybenzylidene)-anabaseine) has been studied as a drug candidate for cognitive and memory deficits, particularly associated with schizophrenia; it has been studied in phase II clinical trials without progression to phase III. Moreover, the modification of the anabaseine pyridine nucleus led to the obtainment of new derivatives endowed with binding and functional selectivity for the α3β4 nicotinic acetylcholine receptor subtype.
