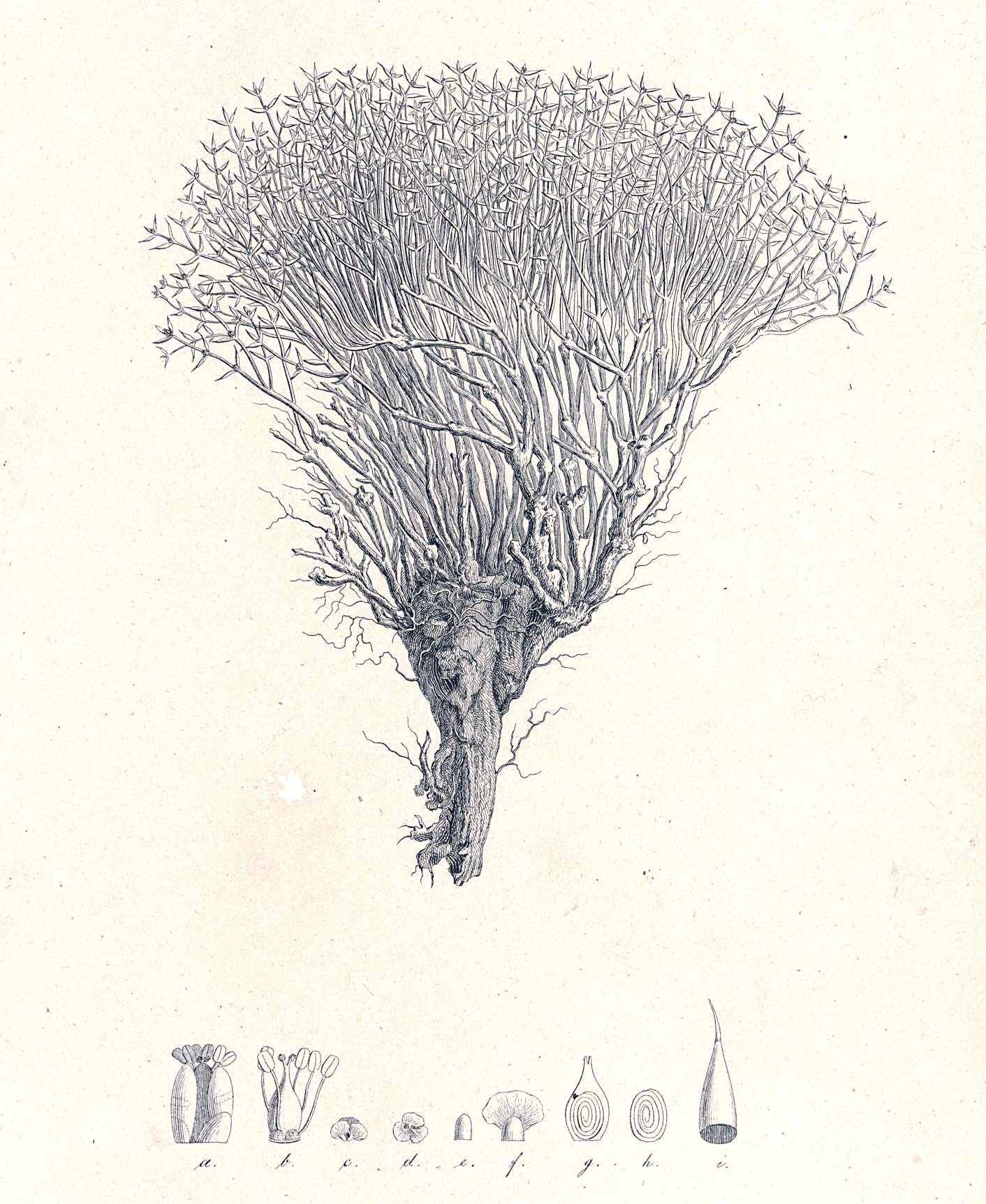

Scientific classification
- Kingdom: Plantae
- Clade: Tracheophytes
- Clade: Angiosperms
- Clade: Eudicots
- Order: Caryophyllales
- Family: Amaranthaceae
- Genus: Anabasis
- Species: A. brevifolia

Binomial name
- Anabasis brevifolia C. A. Mey.

= Anabasis brevifolia =

Species of flowering plant

Anabasis brevifolia, also known as short-leaf anabasis, (Chinese: 短叶假木贼) is a species of flowering plant in the family Amaranthaceae. It is found from the southern West Siberian Plain, across Central Asia to northern China. Together with wormwood, Anabasis brevifolia is an important forage plant in areas of Mongolia and the Kazakh steppe.
