= Nicotine =

Chemical stimulant produced by some plants

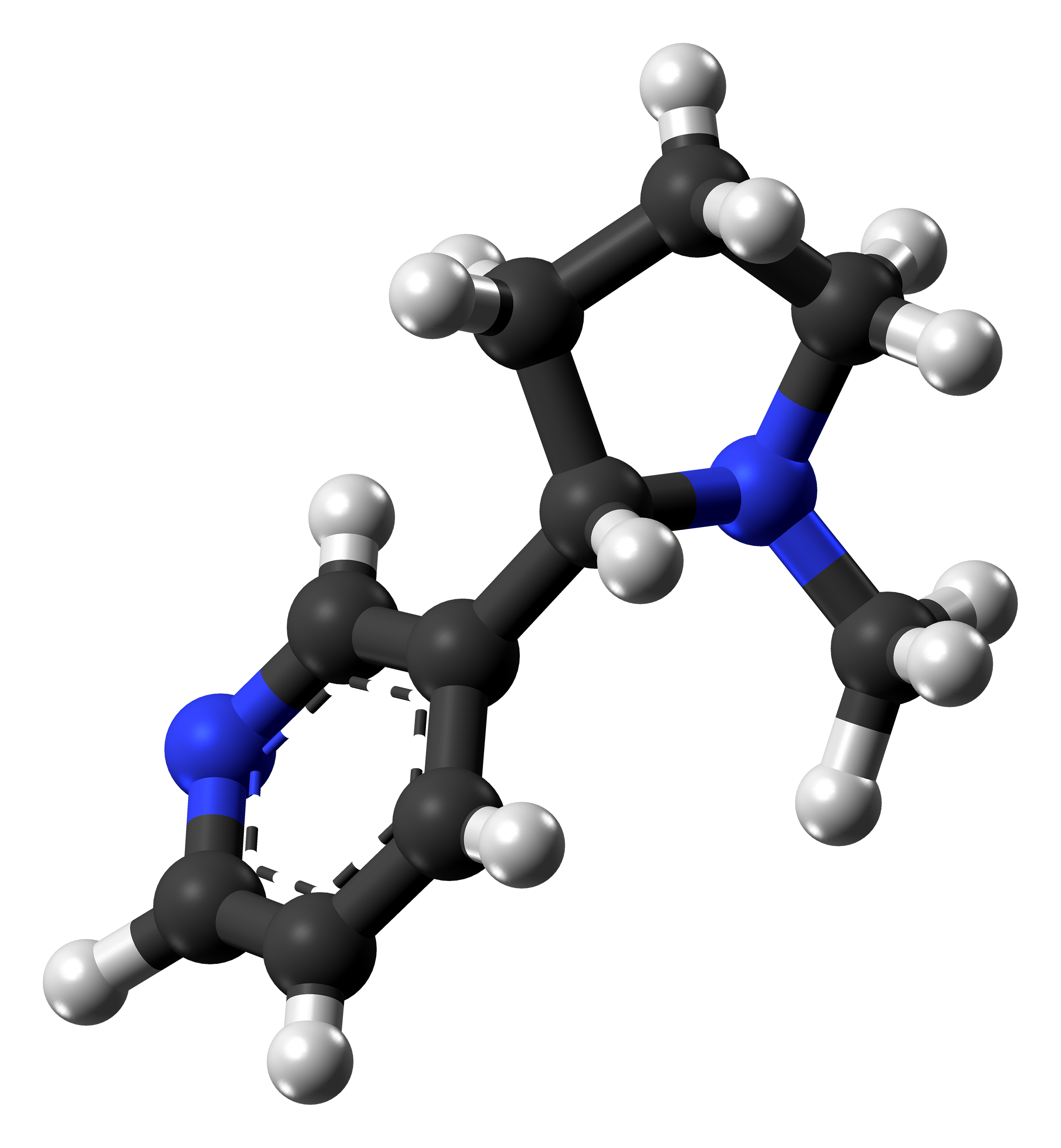

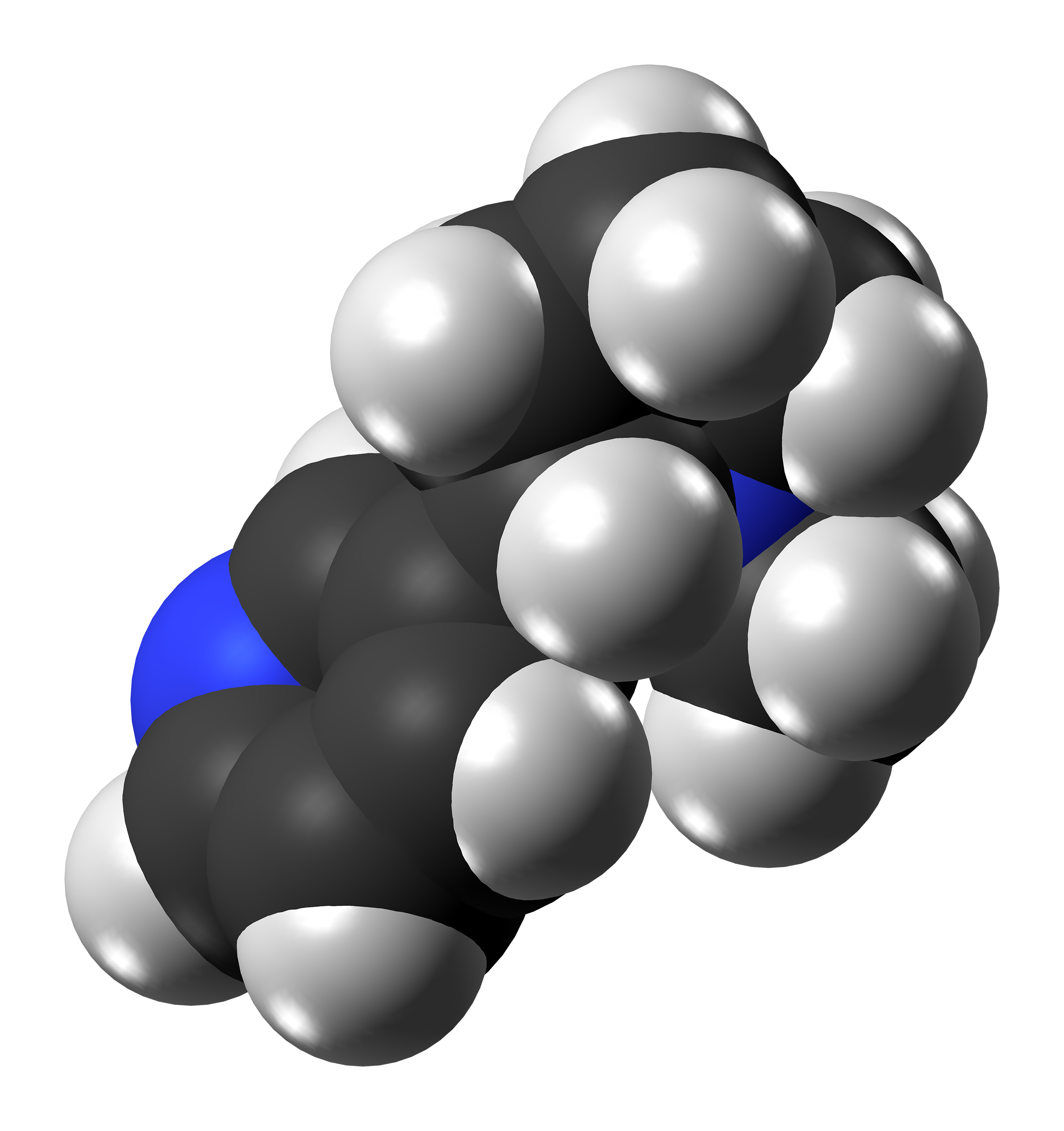

Clinical data
- Trade names: Nicorette, others
- AHFS/Drugs.com: Monograph
- Pregnancy category: AU: D
- Dependence liability: Physical: Low–moderate Psychological: High
- Addiction liability: Very high
- Routes of administration: Inhalation, insufflation, oral, buccal, sublingual, rectal, transdermal, ophthmalmic
- Drug class: Nicotinic agonist; Stimulant; Nootropic; Euphoriant
- ATC code: N07BA01 (WHO) QP53AX13 (WHO)

Legal status
- Legal status: AU: S7 (Dangerous drug); BR: Unscheduled; CA: Unscheduled; DE: Unscheduled; NZ: Unscheduled; UK: General sales list (GSL, OTC); US: OTC and prescription; UN: Unscheduled; EU: Unscheduled / OTC; SE: Unscheduled / OTC (Note: The age limit is set at 18, and the only exception is if it’s prescribed by a doctor.); MX: Unscheduled / OTC (Note: Nicotine-replacement patches, gum and lozenges are available without prescription. Tobacco products may not be sold or supplied to persons under 18. Since 2026, the commercial manufacture, import, export, sale, distribution and supply of electronic cigarettes and vaping devices are prohibited, whether or not they contain nicotine; personal possession and consumption are excluded from the prohibition.)

Pharmacokinetic data
- Bioavailability: Inhalation: 80–90%; Intranasal: 60–80%; Sublingual: 65%; Transdermal: 68–100%
- Protein binding: <5%
- Metabolism: Primarily hepatic: CYP2A6, CYP2B6, FMO3, others
- Metabolites: Cotinine, Nornicotine, others
- Elimination half-life: 1–2 hours; 16–19 hours cotinine (range is 10–27 hours)
- Excretion: Renal, urine pH-dependent; 10–20% (gum), 30% (inhaled); 10–30% (intranasal)

Identifiers
- IUPAC name: 3-[(2S)-1-methylpyrrolidin-2-yl]pyridine
- CAS Number: 54-11-5
- PubChem CID: 89594
- IUPHAR/BPS: 2585
- DrugBank: DB00184
- ChemSpider: 80863
- UNII: 6M3C89ZY6R
- KEGG: D03365
- ChEBI: CHEBI:18723
- ChEMBL: ChEMBL3
- PDB ligand: NCT (PDBe, RCSB PDB)
- CompTox Dashboard (EPA): DTXSID1020930
- ECHA InfoCard: 100.000.177

Chemical and physical data
- Formula: C_{10}H_{14}N_{2}
- Molar mass: 162.236 g·mol^{−1}
- 3D model (JSmol): Interactive image
- Chirality: Chiral
- Density: 1.01 g/cm^{3}
- Melting point: −79 °C (−110 °F)
- Boiling point: 247 °C (477 °F)
- SMILES: c1ncccc1[C@@H]2CCCN2C
- InChI: InChI=1S/C10H14N2/c1-12-7-3-5-10(12)9-4-2-6-11-8-9/h2,4,6,8,10H,3,5,7H2,1H3/t10-/m0/s1; Key:SNICXCGAKADSCV-JTQLQIEISA-N

Nicotine is a stimulant and alkaloid found primarily in plants of the nightshade family, notably in tobacco; it is also synthesized. Nicotine is used recreationally for its stimulant and anxiolytic effects. In tobacco leaves, nicotine constitutes about 0.6–3% of the dry weight, and smaller, trace quantities occur in other Solanaceae crops such as tomatoes, potatoes, and eggplants. In pure form, nicotine is a colorless to yellowish, oily liquid that readily penetrates biological membranes and acts as a potent neurotoxin in insects, where it serves as an antiherbivore toxin. Historically, it was widely used as an insecticide, and its structure provided the basis for synthetic neonicotinoid pesticides.

In humans, nicotine acts primarily as a stimulant by binding to and activating nicotinic acetylcholine receptors (nAChRs) in the central nervous system and peripheral tissues. This results in the release of neurotransmitters such as dopamine, acetylcholine, and norepinephrine, producing effects including increased alertness, reduced anxiety, and mild euphoria. Nicotine is typically consumed through tobacco smoking, vaping, or other nicotine delivery systems. An average cigarette yields about 2 mg of absorbed nicotine, a dose sufficient to produce reinforcement and dependence while remaining far below toxic levels.

Nicotine is highly addictive, and nicotine dependence is characterized by tolerance, physical dependence, psychological dependence, and nicotine withdrawal symptoms such as irritability, anxiety, and difficulty concentrating. Nicotine replacement therapy (NRT) products, including gums, patches, and lozenges, deliver the compound in slower, lower doses that are less addictive and are used medically to help people quit smoking. Synthetic derivatives of nicotine, such as varenicline, act as partial agonists at nicotinic receptors and are also used as smoking cessation aids.

Nicotine itself is not classified as a carcinogen by either the International Agency for Research on Cancer or the Surgeon General of the United States. At high doses it can cause nicotine poisoning and respiratory paralysis. Nicotine is also a known teratogen, associated with adverse developmental effects during pregnancy, and may impair adolescent neurodevelopment, though the extent of this effect in humans remains debated.

== Uses ==
=== Medical ===
The primary therapeutic use of nicotine is treating nicotine dependence to eliminate smoking and the damage it does to health. Nicotine itself is not a standalone cessation tool; its efficacy in smoking cessation relies on nicotine replacement therapy (NRT) delivery systems, which vary formulations (e.g., transdermal patches and lozenges for steady release versus oral gum, inhalers, and nasal sprays for acute relief) to control and modify how much nicotine is delivered and absorbed, and to mimic tobacco pharmacokinetics without harmful byproducts.

A 2018 Cochrane Collaboration review found high-quality evidence that all current forms of nicotine replacement therapy (gum, patch, lozenges, inhaler, and nasal spray) increase the chances of successfully quitting smoking by 50–60%, regardless of setting.

Combining nicotine patch use with a faster acting nicotine replacement, like gum or spray, improves the odds of treatment success.

In contrast to recreational nicotine products, which have been designed to maximize the likelihood of addiction, nicotine replacement products (NRTs) are designed to minimize addictiveness. The more quickly a dose of nicotine is delivered and absorbed, the higher the addiction risk.

=== Pesticide ===
Nicotine has been used as an insecticide since at least 1690, in the form of tobacco extracts or as pure nicotine sulfate (although other components of tobacco also seem to have pesticide effects). It acts on the nicotinic acetylcholine receptor, and gave the receptor its name. Nicotine is in IRAC group 4B. Between 1915 and 1992, nicotine sulfate was available for purchase a home insecticide in the United States under the trade name "Black Leaf 40". Nicotine insecticides have been banned in the US since 2014, including use on organic crops, and is not recommended for small gardeners. Nicotine pesticides have been banned in the EU since 2009. Foods are imported from countries in which nicotine pesticides are allowed, such as China, but foods may not exceed maximum nicotine levels.

Neonicotinoids, such as imidacloprid, are synthetic insecticides derived from and structurally similar to nicotine. They are widely used in agriculture and veterinary medicine. Unlike traditional surface-applied nicotine pesticides, neonicotinoids are systemic: they are absorbed throughout the plant and cannot be washed off. This reduces worker exposure but requires timed applications to limit consumer residues in food crops.

=== Performance ===
Nicotine-containing products are sometimes used for the performance-enhancing effects of nicotine on cognition. A 2010 meta-analysis of 41 double-blind, placebo-controlled studies concluded that nicotine or smoking had significant positive effects on aspects of fine motor abilities, alerting and orienting attention, and episodic and working memory. A 2015 review noted that stimulation of the α4β2 nicotinic receptor is responsible for certain improvements in attentional performance; among the nicotinic receptor subtypes, nicotine has the highest binding affinity at the α4β2 receptor (K_{i}=1 nM), which is also the biological target that mediates nicotine's addictive properties. Nicotine has potential beneficial effects, but it also has paradoxical effects, which may be due to the inverted U-shape of the dose-response curve or pharmacokinetic features.

=== Recreational ===
Nicotine is widely used recreationally through tobacco products, electronic cigarettes, and nicotine pouches, and, as of 2024, 1.2 billion people worldwide use tobacco products. It is highly addictive and hard to discontinue. Nicotine is often used compulsively, and dependence can develop within days. Recreational drug users commonly use nicotine for its mood-altering effects. Recreational nicotine products include chewing tobacco, cigars, cigarettes, e-cigarettes, snuff, pipe tobacco, snus, and nicotine pouches.

Alcohol infused with nicotine is called nicotini.

== Contraindications ==
Nicotine use for tobacco cessation has few contraindications.

It is not known whether nicotine replacement therapy is effective for smoking cessation in adolescents, as of 2014. It is therefore not recommended to adolescents. It is not safe to use nicotine during pregnancy or breastfeeding, although it is safer than smoking. The desirability of NRT use in pregnancy is therefore debated.

Randomized trials and observational studies of nicotine replacement therapy in cardiovascular patients show no increase in adverse cardiovascular events compared to those treated with placebo. Using nicotine products during cancer treatment may be contraindicated, as nicotine may promote tumour growth, but temporary use of NRTs to quit smoking may be advised for harm reduction.

Nicotine gum is contraindicated in individuals with temporomandibular joint disease. People with chronic nasal disorders and severe reactive airway disease require additional precautions when using nicotine nasal sprays. Nicotine in any form is contraindicated in individuals with a known hypersensitivity to nicotine.

== Adverse effects ==
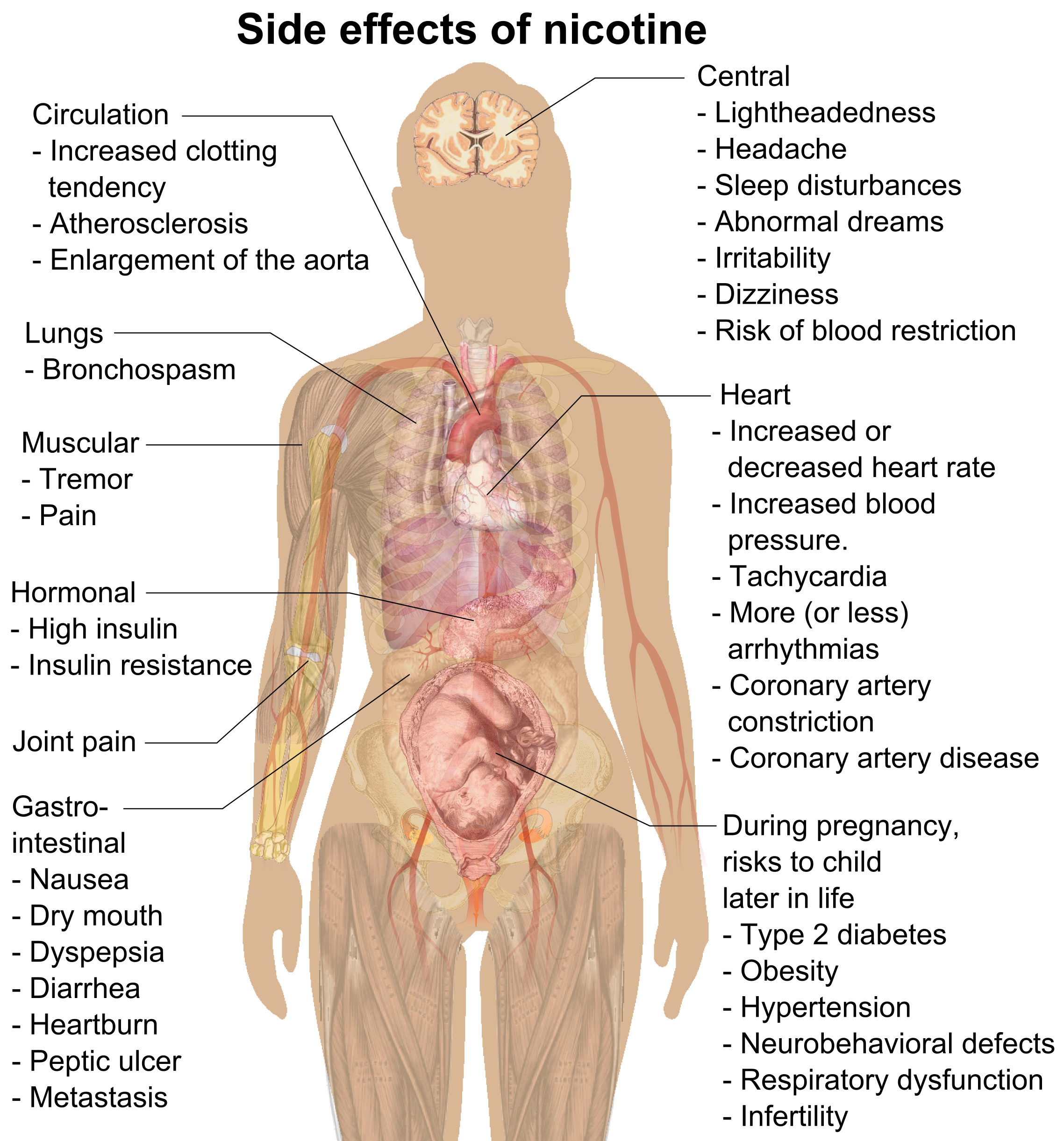
Possible side effects of nicotine

Nicotine is classified as a poison, and it is "extremely hazardous". The CDC says it is "toxic to developing fetuses and is a health danger for pregnant women." It can harm brain development up to age twenty-five, and early use of nicotine can predispose young people to smoking and drug use. However, at doses typically used by consumers, it presents little if any hazard to adult users. Although at low amounts nicotine has a mild analgesic effect, at sufficiently high doses nicotine may result in nausea, vomiting, diarrhea, salivation, bradycardia, and possibly seizures, hypoventilation, and death.

=== Sleep ===
Nicotine reduces the amount of rapid eye movement (REM) sleep, slow-wave sleep (SWS), and total sleep time in healthy nonsmokers given nicotine via a transdermal patch, and the reduction is dose-dependent. Acute nicotine intoxication has been found to significantly reduce total sleep time and increase REM latency, sleep onset latency, and non-rapid eye movement (NREM) stage 2 sleep time. Depressive non-smokers experience mood and sleep improvements under nicotine administration; however, subsequent nicotine withdrawal has a negative effect on both mood and sleep.

=== Cardiovascular system ===
Nicotine exerts several significant effects on the cardiovascular system. Primarily, it stimulates the sympathetic nervous system, leading to the release of catecholamines. This activation results in an increase in heart rate and blood pressure, as well as enhanced myocardial contractility, which raises the workload on the heart. Additionally, nicotine causes systemic vasoconstriction, including constriction of coronary arteries, which can reduce blood flow to the heart. Long-term exposure to nicotine may impair endothelial function, potentially contributing to atherosclerosis. Furthermore, nicotine has been associated with the development of cardiac arrhythmias, particularly in individuals who already have underlying heart disease.

The effects of nicotine can be differentiated between short-term and long-term use. Short-term nicotine use, such as that associated with nicotine replacement therapy (NRT) for smoking cessation, appears to pose little cardiovascular risk, even for patients with known cardiovascular conditions. In contrast, longer-term nicotine use may not accelerate atherosclerosis but could contribute to acute cardiovascular events in those with pre-existing cardiovascular disease. Many severe cardiovascular effects traditionally associated with smoking may not be solely attributable to nicotine itself. Cigarette smoke contains numerous other potentially cardiotoxic substances, including carbon monoxide and oxidant gases.

A 2016 review of the cardiovascular toxicity of nicotine concluded, "Based on current knowledge, we believe that the cardiovascular risks of nicotine from e-cigarette use in people without cardiovascular disease are quite low. We have concerns that nicotine from e-cigarettes could pose some risk for users with cardiovascular disease."

A 2018 Cochrane review found that, in rare cases, nicotine replacement therapy can cause non-ischemic chest pain (i.e., chest pain that is unrelated to a heart attack) and heart palpitations, but does not increase the incidence of serious cardiac adverse events (i.e., myocardial infarction, stroke, and cardiac death) relative to controls.

==== Blood pressure ====
In the short term, nicotine causes a transient increase in blood pressure. Long term, epidemiological studies generally show increased blood pressure and hypertension among nicotine users.

=== Reinforcement disorders ===
ΔFosB accumulation from excessive drug use
Top: this depicts the initial effects of high dose exposure to an addictive drug on gene expression in the nucleus accumbens for various Fos family proteins (i.e., c-Fos, FosB, ΔFosB, Fra1, and Fra2).
Bottom: this illustrates the progressive increase in ΔFosB expression in the nucleus accumbens following repeated twice daily drug binges, where these phosphorylated (35–37 kilodalton) ΔFosB isoforms persist in the D_{1}-type medium spiny neurons of the nucleus accumbens for up to 2 months.

Nicotine is highly addictive but paradoxically has quite weak reinforcing property compared to other drugs of abuse in various animals. Its addictiveness depends on how it is administered and also depends upon the form in which nicotine is used. Animal research suggests that monoamine oxidase inhibitors, acetaldehyde, and other constituents in tobacco smoke may enhance its addictiveness. Nicotine dependence involves aspects of both psychological dependence and physical dependence, since discontinuation of extended use has been shown to produce both affective (e.g., anxiety, irritability, craving, anhedonia) and somatic (mild motor dysfunctions such as tremor) withdrawal symptoms. Withdrawal symptoms peak in one to three days and can persist for several weeks. Even though other drugs of dependence can have withdrawal states lasting 6 months or longer, this does not appear to occur with cigarette withdrawal.

Normal between-cigarettes discontinuation, in unrestricted smokers, causes mild but measurable nicotine withdrawal symptoms. These include mildly worse mood, stress, anxiety, cognition, and sleep, all of which briefly return to normal with the next cigarette. Smokers have a worse mood than they typically would have if they were not nicotine-dependent; they experience normal moods only immediately after smoking. Nicotine dependence is associated with poor sleep quality and shorter sleep duration among smokers.

In dependent smokers, withdrawal causes impairments in memory and attention, and smoking during withdrawal returns these cognitive abilities to pre-withdrawal levels. The temporarily increased cognitive levels of smokers after inhaling smoke are offset by periods of cognitive decline during nicotine withdrawal. Therefore, the overall daily cognitive levels of smokers and non-smokers are roughly similar.

Nicotine activates the mesolimbic pathway and induces long-term ΔFosB expression (i.e., produces phosphorylated ΔFosB isoforms) in the nucleus accumbens when inhaled or injected frequently or at high doses, but not necessarily when ingested. Consequently, high daily exposure (possibly excluding oral route) to nicotine can cause ΔFosB overexpression in the nucleus accumbens, resulting in nicotine addiction.

=== Cancer ===
Contrary to popular belief, nicotine itself does not cause cancer in humans, although it is unclear whether it functions as a tumor promoter as of 2012. A 2018 report by the US National Academies of Sciences, Engineering, and Medicine concludes, "[w]hile it is biologically plausible that nicotine can act as a tumor promoter, the existing body of evidence indicates this is unlikely to translate into increased risk of human cancer."

Although nicotine is classified as a non-carcinogenic substance, it can still theoretically promote tumor growth and metastasis as evidenced from alterations. Nicotine induces several processes, some of them via nicotine's effects on immune function, that contribute to cancer progression in both smoking-related and non-smoking-related cancers, including cell cycle progression, epithelial-to-mesenchymal transition, migration, invasion, angiogenesis, and evasion of apoptosis. These effects are primarily mediated through nicotinic acetylcholine receptors (nAChRs), particularly the α7 subtype, and to a lesser extent, β-adrenergic receptors (β-ARs). Activation of these receptors triggers several signaling cascades crucial in cancer biology, notably the MAPK/ERK pathway, PI3K/AKT pathway, and JAK-STAT signaling.

Nicotine potentially promotes lung cancer development by enhancing proliferation, angiogenesis, migration, invasion, and epithelial–mesenchymal transition (EMT) via nAChRs, which are present in lung cancer cells. Additionally, nicotine-induced EMT contributes to drug resistance in cancer cells.

Nicotine in tobacco can form carcinogenic tobacco-specific nitrosamines through a nitrosation reaction. This occurs mostly in the curing and processing of tobacco.

Nicotine in the mouth and stomach can react to form N-nitrosonornicotine, a type 1 carcinogen, suggesting that oral consumption of non-tobacco forms of nicotine, such as nicotine gum, may be carcinogenic.

=== Pregnancy and breastfeeding ===
Nicotine has been shown to produce birth defects in some animal species, but not others; consequently, it is considered to be a possible teratogen in humans. In animal studies that resulted in birth defects, researchers found that nicotine negatively affects fetal brain development and pregnancy outcomes; the negative effects on early brain development are associated with abnormalities in brain metabolism and neurotransmitter system function. Nicotine crosses the placenta and is found in the breast milk of mothers who smoke as well as mothers who inhale passive smoke.

Nicotine exposure in utero is responsible for several complications of pregnancy and birth: pregnant women who smoke are at greater risk for both miscarriage and stillbirth and infants exposed to nicotine in utero tend to have lower birth weights. A McMaster University research group observed in 2010 that rats exposed to nicotine in the womb (via parenteral infusion) later in life had conditions including type 2 diabetes, obesity, hypertension, neurobehavioral defects, respiratory dysfunction, and infertility.

== Overdose ==
It is unlikely that a person would overdose on nicotine through smoking alone. The US Food and Drug Administration (FDA) stated in 2013 that there are no significant safety concerns associated with the use of more than one form of over-the-counter (OTC) nicotine replacement therapy at the same time, or using OTC NRT at the same time as another nicotine-containing product, like cigarettes. The median lethal dose of nicotine in humans is unknown. Nevertheless, nicotine has a relatively high toxicity in comparison to many other alkaloids such as caffeine, which has an LD_{50} of 127 mg/kg when administered to mice. At sufficiently high doses, it is associated with nicotine poisoning, which, while common in children (in whom poisonous and lethal levels occur at lower doses per kilogram of body weight) rarely results in significant morbidity or death. The estimated lower dose limit for fatal outcomes is 500–1,000 mg of ingested nicotine for an adult (6.5–13 mg/kg).

The initial symptoms of a nicotine overdose typically include nausea, vomiting, diarrhea, hypersalivation, abdominal pain, tachycardia (rapid heart rate), hypertension (high blood pressure), tachypnea (rapid breathing), headache, dizziness, pallor (pale skin), auditory or visual disturbances, and perspiration, followed shortly after by marked bradycardia (slow heart rate), bradypnea (slow breathing), and hypotension (low blood pressure). An increased respiratory rate (i.e., tachypnea) is one of the primary signs of nicotine poisoning. At sufficiently high doses, somnolence (sleepiness or drowsiness), confusion, syncope (loss of consciousness from fainting), shortness of breath, marked weakness, seizures, and coma may occur. Lethal nicotine poisoning rapidly produces seizures, and death – which may occur within minutes – is believed to be due to respiratory paralysis.

=== Toxicity ===
Today nicotine is less commonly used in agricultural insecticides, which was a main source of poisoning. More recent cases of poisoning typically appear to be in the form of Green Tobacco Sickness (GTS), accidental ingestion of tobacco or tobacco products, or ingestion of nicotine-containing plants. People who harvest or cultivate tobacco may experience GTS, a type of nicotine poisoning caused by dermal exposure to wet tobacco leaves. This occurs most commonly in young, inexperienced tobacco harvesters who do not consume tobacco. People can be exposed to nicotine in the workplace by breathing it in, skin absorption, swallowing it, or eye contact. The Occupational Safety and Health Administration (OSHA) has set the legal limit (permissible exposure limit) for nicotine exposure in the workplace as 0.5 mg/m^{3} skin exposure over an 8-hour workday. The US National Institute for Occupational Safety and Health (NIOSH) has set a recommended exposure limit (REL) of 0.5 mg/m^{3} skin exposure over an 8-hour workday. At environmental levels of 5 mg/m^{3}, nicotine is immediately dangerous to life and health.

== Drug interactions ==
=== Pharmacodynamic ===
- Potential interaction with sympathomimetic drugs (adrenergic agonists) and sympatholytic drugs (alpha-blockers and beta-blockers).

=== Pharmacokinetic ===
Nicotine and cigarette smoke both induce the expression of liver enzymes (e.g., certain cytochrome P450 proteins) which metabolize drugs, leading to the potential for alterations in drug metabolism.

- Smoking cessation may decrease the metabolism of acetaminophen, beta-blockers, caffeine, oxazepam, pentazocine, propoxyphene, theophylline, and tricyclic antidepressants, leading to higher plasma concentrations of these drugs.
- Possible alteration of nicotine absorption through the skin from the transdermal nicotine patch by drugs that cause vasodilation or vasoconstriction.
- Possible alteration of nicotine absorption through the nasal cavity from the nicotine nasal spray by nasal vasoconstrictors (e.g., xylometazoline).
- Possible alteration of nicotine absorption through oral mucosa from nicotine gum and lozenges by food and drink that modify salivary pH.

== Pharmacology ==
=== Pharmacodynamics ===
Nicotine acts as a receptor agonist at most nicotinic acetylcholine receptors (nAChRs), except at two nicotinic receptor subunits (nAChRα9 and nAChRα10) where it acts as a receptor antagonist. Such antagonism results in mild analgesia.

The stereochemistry of nicotine is crucial to its biological effects. Due to the chiral nature of its receptors in the body, the (S)-enantiomer is substantially more active. For this reason, nearly all pharmacological and toxicological data is based on studies of (S)-nicotine. (S)-Nicotine is 4–28 times more potent than (R)-nicotine in standard nicotinic receptor binding and functional assays and elicits stronger nasal irritation, stinging, and mucosal responses at lower detection thresholds—yet smokers rated it as more pleasant in the only human sensory study. The pharmacological, metabolic, and toxicological effects of (R)-nicotine and of racemic (R)/(S)-nicotine mixtures in humans remain poorly understood, with data largely limited to animal studies.

==== Central nervous system ====
===== Acute effects on CNS =====
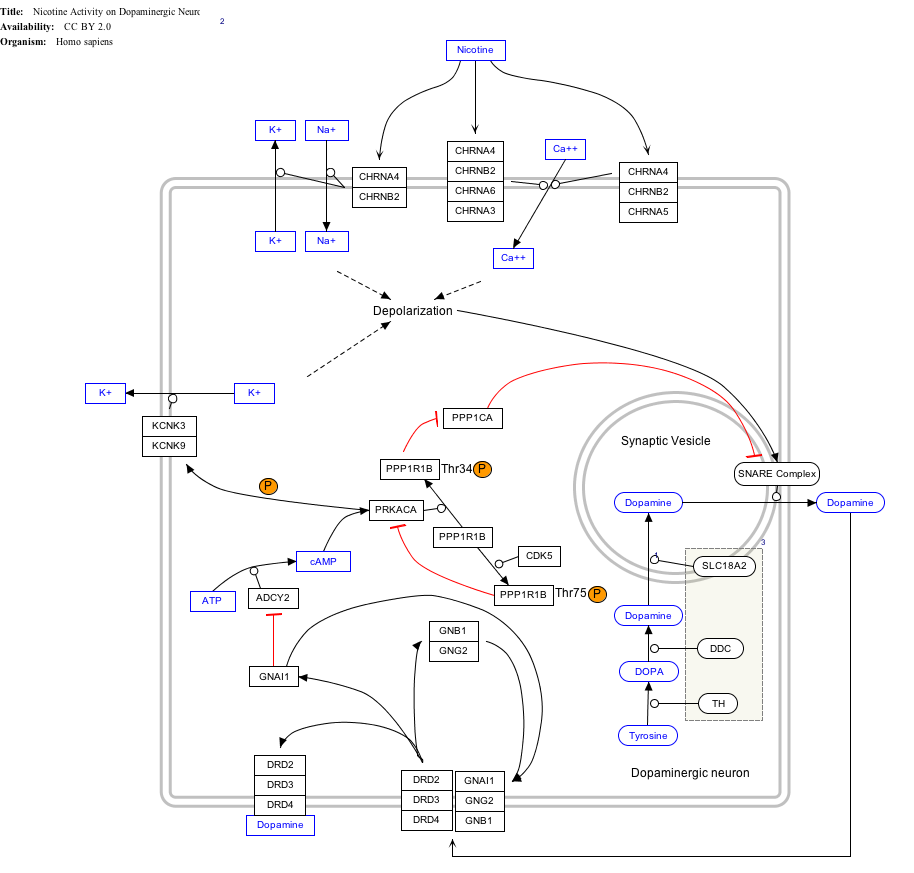
Effect of nicotine on dopaminergic neurons

By binding to nicotinic acetylcholine receptors in the brain, nicotine elicits its psychoactive effects and increases the levels of several neurotransmitters in various brain structures – acting as a sort of "volume control". Nicotine has a higher affinity for nicotinic receptors in the brain than those in skeletal muscle, though at toxic doses it can induce contractions and respiratory paralysis. Nicotine's selectivity is thought to be due to a particular amino acid difference on these receptor subtypes. Nicotine is unusual in comparison to most drugs, as its profile changes from stimulant to sedative with increasing dosages, a phenomenon known as "Nesbitt's paradox" after the doctor who first described it in 1969. At very high doses it dampens neuronal activity. Nicotine induces both behavioral stimulation and anxiety in animals. Research into nicotine's most predominant metabolite, cotinine, suggests that some of nicotine's psychoactive effects are mediated by cotinine.

Nicotine activates nicotinic receptors (particularly α4β2 nicotinic receptors, but also α5 nAChRs) on neurons that innervate the ventral tegmental area and within the mesolimbic pathway where it appears to cause the release of dopamine. This nicotine-induced dopamine release occurs at least partially through activation of the cholinergic–dopaminergic reward link in the ventral tegmental area. Nicotine can modulate the firing rate of the ventral tegmental area neurons. These actions are largely responsible for the strongly reinforcing effects of nicotine, which often occur in the absence of euphoria; however, mild euphoria from nicotine use can occur in some individuals.

===== Long-term effects on CNS =====
Chronic exposure to nicotine induces several molecular changes in neuronal systems, particularly within the mesolimbic dopamine pathway and associated circuits. These adaptations include desensitization and upregulation of nAChRs and downregulation of related enzymes (e.g. class I and II histone deacetylases in the striatum), alterations in transcription factors, and modifications to dopamine synthesis and release.

Nicotine binds to presynaptic and postsynaptic nAChRs, leading to initial activation followed by desensitization—a conformational shift rendering receptors temporarily unresponsive. Chronic nicotine exposure promotes upregulation of nAChRs in brain regions like the ventral tegmental area and striatum, with increased receptor density observed within 1–7 days and peaking after 10–14 days in rodent models. Human imaging studies show this upregulation is temporary and returns to baseline levels in nonsmokers by approximately 21 days after smoking cessation but full recovery taking 6–12 weeks.

Chronic nicotine use also leads to accumulation of the transcription factor ΔFosB in dopamine D_{1}-type medium spiny neurons of the nucleus accumbens, a process implicated in sustained reward pathway modifications. This elevation is longer-lasting and persists "for weeks and months even when substance use has ceased."

Additionally, positron emission tomography (PET) studies indicate reduced presynaptic dopamine synthesis capacity in the striatum of chronic smokers, as measured by 18F-DOPA uptake. This deficit, approximately 15–20% lower than in nonsmokers, normalizes after about 3 months of abstinence.

A 2016 study found that nicotine exposure creates long-lasting malleable circuits 7 months after the initial exposure to nicotine and 6 months after stopping its administration. Other studies suggest broader neuronal recovery, such as normalization of dopamine transporter (DAT) levels in reward centers, may extend up to 12–14 months in some cases of substance dependence affecting dopamine levels, though specific data for nicotine are limited.

==== Sympathetic nervous system ====
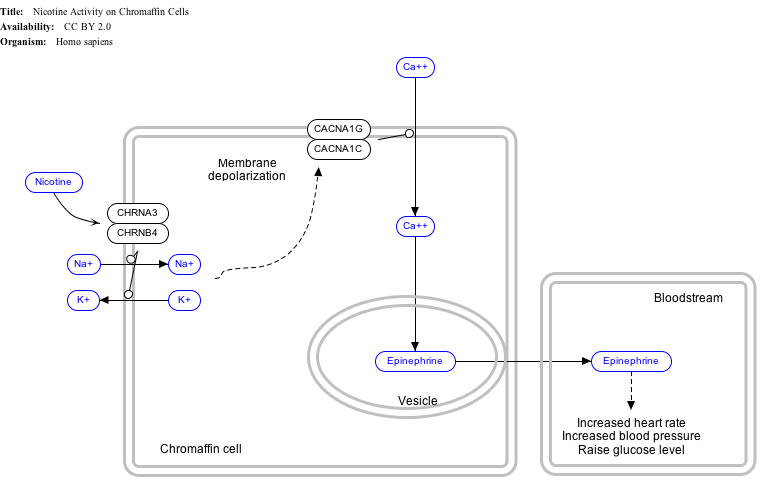
Effect of nicotine on chromaffin cells

Nicotine also activates the sympathetic nervous system, acting via splanchnic nerves to the adrenal medulla, stimulating the release of epinephrine. Acetylcholine released by preganglionic sympathetic fibers of these nerves acts on nicotinic acetylcholine receptors, causing the release of epinephrine (and norepinephrine) into the bloodstream.

==== Adrenal medulla ====
By binding to ganglion type nicotinic receptors in the adrenal medulla, nicotine increases flow of adrenaline (epinephrine), a stimulating hormone and neurotransmitter. By binding to the receptors, it causes cell depolarization and an influx of calcium through voltage-gated calcium channels. Calcium triggers the exocytosis of chromaffin granules and thus the release of epinephrine (and norepinephrine) into the bloodstream. The release of epinephrine (adrenaline) causes an increase in heart rate, blood pressure and respiration, as well as higher blood glucose levels.

=== Pharmacokinetics ===
Urinary metabolites of nicotine, quantified as average percentage of total urinary nicotine

As nicotine enters the body, it is distributed quickly through the bloodstream and crosses the blood–brain barrier reaching the brain within 10–20 seconds after inhalation. The elimination half-life of nicotine in the body is around two hours. Nicotine is primarily excreted in urine and urinary concentrations vary depending upon urine flow rate and urine pH.

The amount of nicotine absorbed by the body from smoking can depend on many factors, including the types of tobacco, whether the smoke is inhaled, and whether a filter is used. However, it has been found that the nicotine yield of individual products has only a small effect (4.4%) on the blood concentration of nicotine, suggesting "the assumed health advantage of switching to lower-tar and lower-nicotine cigarettes may be largely offset by the tendency of smokers to compensate by increasing inhalation".

Cotinine is an active metabolite of nicotine that remains in the blood with a half-life of 18–20 hours, making it easier to analyze due to longer half-life than that of nicotine itself.

Nicotine is metabolized in the liver by cytochrome P450 enzymes (mostly CYP2A6, and also by CYP2B6) and FMO3, which selectively metabolizes (S)-nicotine. A major metabolite is cotinine. Other primary metabolites include nicotine N-oxide, nornicotine, nicotine isomethonium ion, 2-hydroxynicotine and nicotine glucuronide. Under some conditions, other substances may be formed such as myosmine.

Glucuronidation and oxidative metabolism of nicotine to cotinine are both inhibited by menthol, an additive to mentholated cigarettes, thus increasing the half-life of nicotine in vivo.

==== Influence of ionization state ====
Nicotine's absorption is modulated by its ionization state, governed by pH relative to pKa values (8.10 for pyrrolidine nitrogen, 3.41 for pyridine). At physiological pH (~7.4), it is mostly monoprotonated (cationic); above pH 8, it becomes unprotonated free-base, which is lipophilic and volatile. The distribution of nicotine among its free-base and protonated forms in aerosolised nicotine affects inhalability; it has been manipulated in tobacco smoke and now in electronic cigarettes by the use of acids to de-freebase nicotine and form 'nicotine salts'. Pod mod electronic cigarettes use nicotine in the form of a protonated nicotine, rather than free-base nicotine found in earlier generations.

Free-base nicotine enables rapid membrane diffusion and higher bioavailability in early tobacco/oral studies. Yet, recent e-cigarette research contradicts this: protonated salts (e.g., nicotine benzoate, lactate, levulinate from acid addition) yield higher Cmax and faster onset than equivalent free-base. For example, 2% benzoate salt produced 3x higher Cmax in human puffing trials. Notably, Cmax of protonated nicotine salts appears independent of the composition and identity of the counter anions (e.g., benzoate, lactate, levulinate) forming the salts for higher administered nicotine formulations.

These effects stem from aerosol dynamics—salts form low-volatility submicron particles for deeper lung deposition and less exhalation loss, versus free-base's superficial deposition. Sensorily, free-base delivers a harsh throat hit, while salts allow smoother high-dose inhalation, boosting appeal and intake.

=== Metabolism ===
Nicotine decreases hunger and as a consequence food consumption, alongside increasing energy expenditure. The majority of research shows that nicotine reduces body weight, but some researchers have found that nicotine may result in weight gain under specific types of eating habits in animal models. Nicotine effect on weight appears to result from nicotine's stimulation of α3β4 nAChR receptors located in the POMC neurons in the arcuate nucleus and subsequently the melanocortin system, especially the melanocortin-4 receptors on second-order neurons in the paraventricular nucleus of the hypothalamus, thus modulating feeding inhibition. POMC neurons are a precursor of the melanocortin system, a critical regulator of body weight and peripheral tissue such as skin and hair.

== Chemistry ==
NFPA 704 safety square
- 4 1 0 The fire diamond hazard sign for nicotine

Nicotine is a very hygroscopic, colorless to pale yellow, oily liquid that gradually turns brown on exposure to air or light. It develops a characteristic pungent, fishy odor of pyridine and has an acrid burning taste. Pure nicotine tastes "terrible". It is very soluble in alcohol, chloroform, ether, light petroleum, kerosene, or oils. It is miscible with water in its neutral amine base form between 60 °C and 210 °C. It is a dibasic nitrogenous base, having K_{b1}=1×10^{−6}, K_{b2}=1×10^{−11}. It readily forms ammonium salts with acids that are usually solid and water-soluble. Its flash point is 95 °C, and its auto-ignition temperature is 244 °C. Nicotine is volatile (vapor pressure 5.5 Pa at 25 °C) On exposure to ultraviolet light or various oxidizing agents, nicotine is converted to nicotine oxide, nicotinic acid (niacin, a B3 vitamer), and methylamine.

Anabasine is a structural isomer of nicotine, as both compounds have the molecular formula C_{10}H_{14}N_{2}.

=== Stereochemistry ===
Nicotine has a chiral center at the C2' position of the pyrrolidine ring, and therefore exists as two enantiomers: (S)-nicotine and (R)-nicotine.

- (S)-Nicotine − this naturally occurring form of nicotine, found in tobacco plants at over 99% purity, is levorotatory with a specific rotation of [α]_{D}(20°C)=–169.3°.
- (R)-Nicotine − this is the dextrorotatory form that is physiologically less active and less toxic than (S)-nicotine.

The salts of (S)-nicotine are usually dextrorotatory; this conversion between levorotatory and dextrorotatory upon protonation is common among alkaloids. The hydrochloride and sulfate salts become optically inactive if heated in a closed vessel above 180 °C.

The most common chemistry synthetic methods for generating nicotine yield a product that is approximately equal proportions of the S- and R-enantiomers. Tobacco-derived nicotine (>99% (S)-enantiomer) is distinguishable from synthetic nicotine (typically racemic, 50:50 (S)/(R)) by enantiomeric ratio analysis, although strategies exist for adjusting the relative levels of the enantiomers or performing a synthesis that only leads to the pure S-enantiomer. Synthetic stereospecific (S)-nicotine has become available on the market to consumers of electronic cigarette products. Nicotine enantiomers differ in their biological effects on animals.

Structure of protonated nicotine (left) and structure of the counterion benzoate (right). This combination is used in some vaping products to increase nicotine delivery to the lung.

=== Preparation ===
The first laboratory preparation of nicotine (as its racemate) was described in 1904.

The starting material was an N-substituted pyrrole derivative, which was heated to convert it by a [1,5] sigmatropic shift to the isomer with a carbon bond between the pyrrole and pyridine rings, followed by methylation and selective reduction of the pyrrole ring using tin and hydrochloric acid. Many other syntheses of nicotine, in both racemic and chiral forms have since been published.

=== Biosynthesis ===
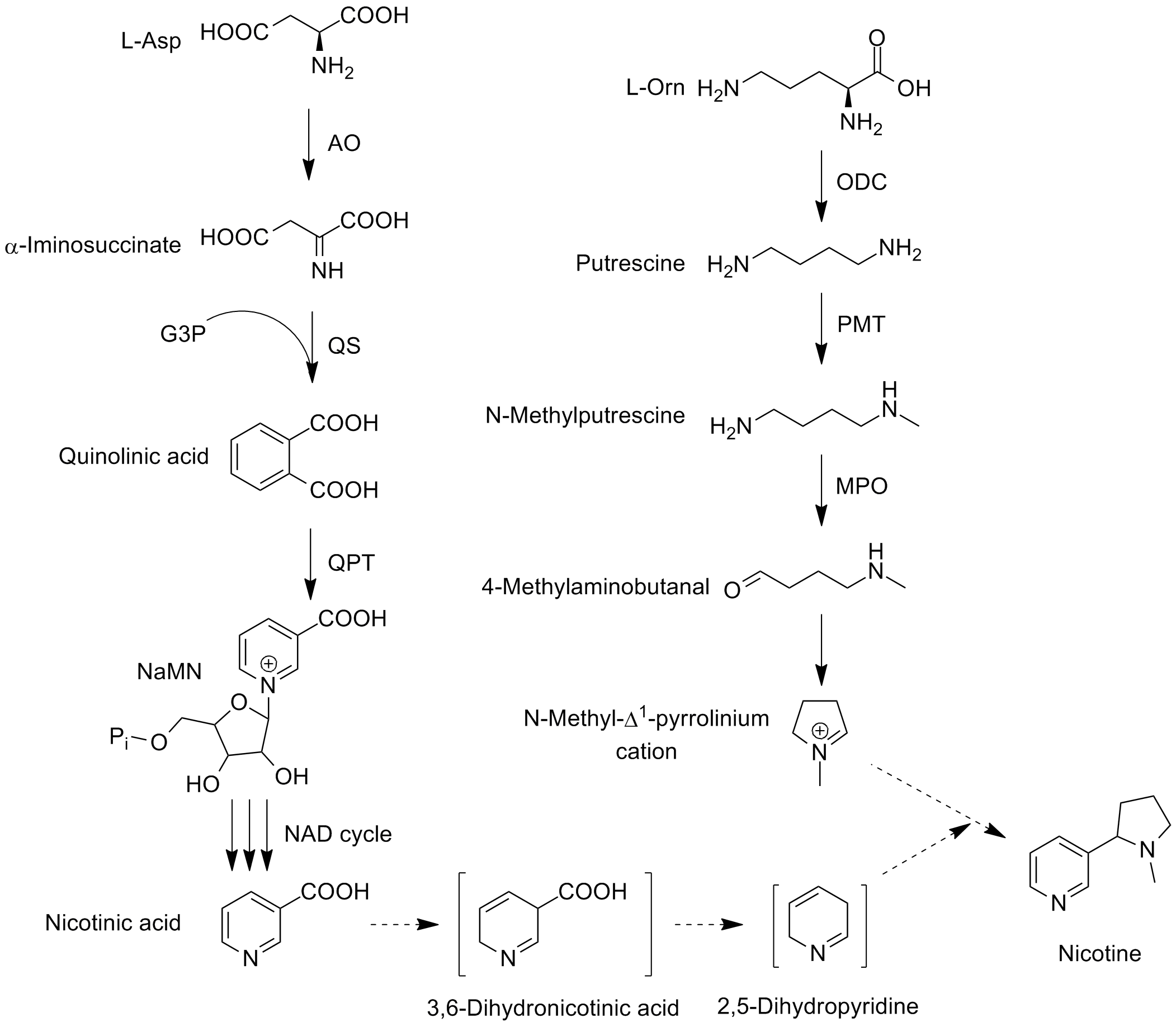
Nicotine biosynthesis

The biosynthetic pathway of nicotine involves a coupling reaction between the two cyclic structures that comprise nicotine. Metabolic studies show that the pyridine ring of nicotine is derived from nicotinic acid, while the pyrrolidine is derived from N-methyl-Δ^{1}-pyrrollidium cation. Biosynthesis of the two component structures proceeds via two independent syntheses, the NAD pathway for nicotinic acid and the tropane pathway for N-methyl-Δ^{1}-pyrrollidium cation.

The NAD pathway in the genus Nicotiana begins with the oxidation of aspartic acid into α-amino succinate by aspartate oxidase (AO). This is followed by a condensation with glyceraldehyde-3-phosphate and a cyclization catalyzed by quinolinate synthase (QS) to give quinolinic acid. Quinolinic acid then reacts with phosphoribosyl pyrophosphate catalyzed by quinolinic acid phosphoribosyl transferase (QPT) to form nicotinic acid mononucleotide (NaMN). The reaction now proceeds via the NAD salvage cycle to produce nicotinic acid via the conversion of nicotinamide by the enzyme nicotinamidase.

The N-methyl-Δ^{1}-pyrrollidium cation used in the synthesis of nicotine is an intermediate in the synthesis of tropane-derived alkaloids. Biosynthesis begins with decarboxylation of ornithine by ornithine decarboxylase (ODC) to produce putrescine. Putrescine is then converted into N-methyl putrescine via methylation by SAM catalyzed by putrescine N-methyltransferase (PMT). N-methyl putrescine then undergoes deamination into 4-methylaminobutanal by the N-methyl putrescine oxidase (MPO) enzyme, 4-methylaminobutanal then spontaneously cyclize into N-methyl-Δ^{1}-pyrrollidium cation.

The final step in the synthesis of nicotine is the coupling between N-methyl-Δ^{1}-pyrrollidium cation and nicotinic acid. Although studies conclude some form of coupling between the two component structures, the definite process and mechanism remains undetermined. The current agreed theory involves the conversion of nicotinic acid into 2,5-dihydropyridine through 3,6-dihydronicotinic acid. The 2,5-dihydropyridine intermediate would then react with N-methyl-Δ^{1}-pyrrollidium cation to form enantiomerically pure (−)-nicotine.

=== Detection in body fluids ===
Nicotine can be quantified in blood, plasma, or urine to confirm a diagnosis of poisoning or to facilitate a medicolegal death investigation. Urinary or salivary cotinine concentrations are frequently measured for the purposes of pre-employment and health insurance medical screening programs. Careful interpretation of results is important, since passive exposure to cigarette smoke can result in significant accumulation of nicotine, followed by the appearance of its metabolites in various body fluids. Nicotine use is not regulated in competitive sports programs.

=== Methods for analysis of enantiomers ===
Methods for measuring the two enantiomers are straightforward and include normal-phase liquid chromatography, liquid chromatography with a chiral column. However, since methods can be used to alter the two enantiomers, it may not be possible to distinguish tobacco-derived from synthetic nicotine simply by measuring the levels of the two enantiomers. A new approach uses hydrogen and deuterium nuclear magnetic resonance to distinguish tobacco-derived and synthetic nicotine based on differences the substrates used in the natural synthetic pathway performed in the tobacco plant and the substrates most used in synthesis. Another approach measures the carbon-14 content which also differs between natural and laboratory-based tobacco. These methods remain to be fully evaluated and validated using a wide range of samples.

=== Analogues and derivatives ===
Analogues and derivatives of nicotine are known. These compounds, often structurally similar and sharing affinity for nicotinic acetylcholine receptors, have applications in pharmacology (e.g., smoking cessation), pest control, and neuroscience research (e.g., multiple domain cognitive enhancement, neuroprotection).

==== Natural analogues ====
Natural analogues of nicotine, often found in plants or other biological sources, include anabasine (from Anabasis aphylla), anatabine (from tobacco), arecoline (from betel nut), cotinine (major metabolite of nicotine), cytisine (from Laburnum species), and epibatidine (from frog skin), among others.

==== Synthetic analogues ====
Synthetic analogues and derivatives, typically developed for research or therapeutic purposes, include altinicline, 6-chloronicotine, dianicline, levamisole, RJR-2429, TC-1698, UB-165, GTS-21, and varenicline, among others.

== Natural occurrence ==
Nicotine is a secondary metabolite produced in a variety of plants in the family Solanaceae, most notably in tobacco Nicotiana tabacum, where it can be found at high concentrations of 0.5 to 7.5%. Nicotine is also present in other tobacco species, such as Nicotiana rustica (in amounts of 2–14%). Nicotine production is strongly induced in response to wounding as part of a jasmonate-dependent reaction. Specialist insects on tobacco, such as the tobacco hornworm (Manduca sexta), have a number of adaptations to the detoxification and even adaptive re-purposing of nicotine. Nicotine is also found at low concentrations in the nectar of tobacco plants, where it may promote outcrossing by affecting the behavior of hummingbird pollinators.

Nicotine occurs in smaller amounts (varying from 2–7 μg/kg, or 20–70 millionths of a percent wet weight) in other Solanaceaeous plants, including some crop species such as potatoes, tomatoes, eggplant, and peppers, as well as non-crop species such as Duboisia hopwoodii. The amounts of nicotine in tomatoes lowers substantially as the fruit ripens. A 1999 report found "In some papers it is suggested that the contribution of dietary nicotine intake is significant when compared with exposure to ETS [environmental tobacco smoke] or by active smoking of small numbers of cigarettes. Others consider the dietary intake to be negligible unless inordinately large amounts of specific vegetables are consumed." The amount of nicotine eaten per day is roughly around 1.4 and 2.25 μg/day at the 95th percentile. These numbers may be low due to insufficient food intake data. The concentrations of nicotine in vegetables are difficult to measure accurately, since they are very low (parts per billion range).

The biological function of nicotine in the tobacco plant is as an antiherbivore neurotoxin. Some species have evolved resistance to nicotine, such as Manduca sexta. In the tobacco plant, it is produced in the roots, then transported to the leaves. It has little effect on the plant itself. Grafting the top of a tomato plant to a tobacco root does not harm the tomato plant despite accumulating nicotine in the leaves. Conversely, grafting the top of a tobacco plant to a tomato root does not harm the tobacco plant, despite not receiving nicotine.

== History ==
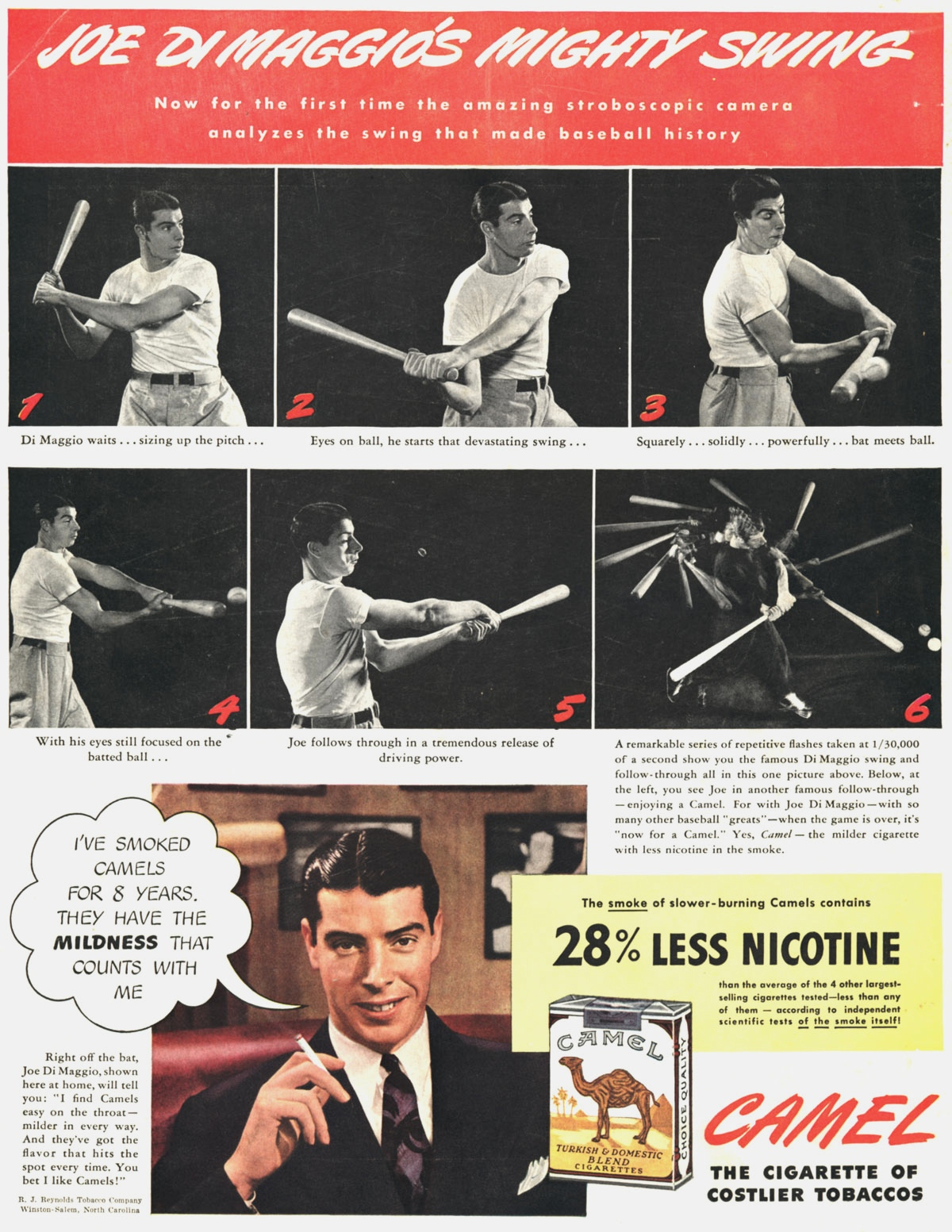
Cigarette ad featuring baseball player Joe DiMaggio in 1941

Nicotine was originally isolated from the tobacco plant in 1828 by chemists Wilhelm Heinrich Posselt and Karl Ludwig Reimann from Germany, who believed it was a poison. Its chemical empirical formula was described by Melsens in 1843, its structure was discovered by Adolf Pinner and Richard Wolffenstein in 1893, and it was first synthesized by Amé Pictet and A. Rotschy in 1904.

Nicotine is named after the tobacco plant Nicotiana tabacum, which in turn is named after the French ambassador in Portugal, Jean Nicot de Villemain, who sent tobacco and seeds to Paris in 1560, presented to the French King, and who promoted their medicinal use. Smoking was believed to protect against illness, particularly the plague. However, the "holy herb", tobacco, had first reached Europe by the early 1530s, brought by Spanish explorers.

Following its introduction, tobacco rapidly gained popularity in Europe for its stimulating effects, fueled by nicotine's addictive and pharmacological properties and tobacco's widespread embrace as a cure-all. By the early 17th century, this allure fueled its mercilessly laborious cultivation as a cash crop in the Virginia colonies, where John Rolfe's introduction in 1612 rescued Jamestown from economic collapse and famine, transforming it into a prosperous export hub with over 20,000 pounds shipped by 1619 and laying the groundwork for transatlantic trade. From the 17th century onward, tobacco smoking became virtually central to European social, economic, and cultural history and beyond, entrenching itself in daily rituals, trade networks, and even international conflicts.

By the late 17th century, tobacco was used not only for smoking but also as an insecticide. After World War II, over 2,500 tons of nicotine insecticide were used worldwide, but by the 1980s the use of nicotine insecticide had declined below 200 tons. This was due to the availability of other insecticides that are cheaper and less harmful to mammals.

The nicotine content of popular American-brand cigarettes has increased over time, and one study found that there was an average increase of 1.78% per year between the years of 1998 and 2005.

Although methods of production of synthetic nicotine have existed for decades, it was believed that the cost of making nicotine by laboratory synthesis was cost prohibitive compared to extracting nicotine from tobacco. However, recently synthetic nicotine started to be found in different brands of e-cigarettes and oral pouches and marketed as "tobacco-free".

== Society and culture ==
=== Regulation ===
In the United States, the Food and Drug Administration (FDA) regulates nicotine as a tobacco product under the 2009 Family Smoking Prevention and Tobacco Control Act. The FDA is tasked with reviewing tobacco products such as e-cigarettes and determining which can be authorized for sale.

In March 2022, the US Congress passed a law (the Consolidated Appropriations Act, 2022) that expanded FDA's tobacco regulatory authority to include tobacco products containing nicotine from any source, thereby including products made with synthetic nicotine.

On January 17, 2025, the FDA proposed a strongly endorsed rule to reduce nicotine in cigarettes and certain combusted tobacco products to minimally or non-addictive levels, capping nicotine yield at 0.7 mg per gram of tobacco, approximately a 95% reduction from current commercial levels.

In the European Union, the Tobacco Products Directive (2014/40/EU) regulates the manufacture, presentation, and sale of tobacco and related products.

In the United Kingdom, the Tobacco and Related Products Regulations 2016 implemented the European directive 2014/40/EU, amended by Tobacco Products and Nicotine Inhaling Products (Amendment etc.) (EU Exit) Regulations 2019 and the Tobacco Products and Nicotine Inhaling Products (Amendment) (EU Exit) Regulations 2020. Additionally other regulations limit advertising, sale and display of tobacco products and other products containing nicotine for human consumption. The Sunak government proposed banning disposable vapes to limit their appeal and affordability for children and to reduce the amount of waste generated.

==== Age limits on purchase ====
In the United States, over-the-counter nicotine replacement therapy products are only available to people aged 18 and above, and it is not for sale in vending machines or from any source where proof of age cannot be verified. The minimum age to purchase tobacco products in the US is 21 at the federal level.

In the European Union, the minimum age to purchase nicotine products is 18 in all member states except Latvia, where it is 20. However, there is no minimum age requirement to use tobacco or nicotine products.

In the United Kingdom, the minimum age to purchase tobacco products is 18.

=== In media ===
External image
- An image showing Nick O'Teen fleeing from Superman, Comic Vine

The public's lack of understanding regarding nicotine's biological effects frequently results in inaccurate claims disseminated by the media and general public.

In some anti-smoking literature, the harm that tobacco smoking and nicotine addiction does is personified as Nick O'Teen, represented as a humanoid with some aspect of a cigarette or cigarette butt about him or his clothes and hat. Nick O'Teen was a villain that was created for the Health Education Council. The character was featured in three animated anti-smoking public service announcements in which he tries to get kids addicted to cigarettes before being foiled by the DC Comics character Superman.

Nicotine was often compared to caffeine in advertisements in the 1980s by the tobacco industry, and later in the 2010s by the electronic cigarettes industry, in an effort to reduce the stigmatization and the public perception of the risks associated with nicotine use.

== Research ==
=== Central nervous system ===
While acute/initial nicotine intake causes activation of neuronal nicotinic receptors, chronic low doses of nicotine use leads to desensitization of those receptors (due to the development of tolerance) and results in an antidepressant effect, with early research showing low dose nicotine patches could be an effective treatment of major depressive disorder in non-smokers. Nicotine anti-depressant effects have been documented in murine research.

Though tobacco smoking is associated with an increased risk of Alzheimer's disease, there is evidence that nicotine itself has the potential to prevent and treat Alzheimer's disease.

Smoking is linked to a lower risk of Parkinson's disease (PD). This is partly attributed to nicotine's neuroprotective effects on the nigrostriatal system. Nicotine may also raise synaptic dopamine by inhibiting the striatal dopamine transporter, counteracting PD's dopamine deficit, while also causing left mPFC atrophy in smokers who do develop PD, possibly tied to cognitive impairment. Reverse causation or non-nicotine smoke constituents remain possible contributors.

Nicotine may partly attenuate sensory gating and attentional deficits associated with schizophrenia. Short-term use of transdermal nicotine was found to improve subjects' reaction time and alertness in given tasks. Nicotine was not found to improve negative, positive, or other cognitive symptoms of schizophrenia.

Nicotine dependence pathophysiology in heavy smokers suggests less efficient network architecture in the brain and disruptions in the topological organization of brain networks, with the altered brain network metrics correlated with the duration of cigarette use and the severity of nicotine dependence.

Some long-term effects of nicotine may be irreversible because "it is entirely possible that doses of nicotine achieved in the brains of human smokers can damage or kill mHb [medial habenula] neurons that regulate nicotine avoidance behaviors", but more studies are needed to elucidate this underlying mechanism of nicotine-induced degeneration of the mHb-IPn circuit .

A 2026 Nature study revealed that nicotine mimics endogenous acetylcholine in the nucleus accumbens, artificially triggering dopamine release to biologically "tag" behaviors as valuable, high-effort achievements regardless of actual difficulty. During active use, this chemical shortcut causes salience dysregulation and "false productivity," as the brain assigns intense reward signals to trivial tasks independent of outcome quality while displacing ambition for a meaningful achievement.

=== Immune system ===
Immune cells of both the innate immune system and adaptive immune systems frequently express the α_{2}, α_{5}, α_{6}, α_{7}, α_{9}, and α_{10} subunits of nicotinic acetylcholine receptors. Evidence suggests that nicotinic receptors which contain these subunits are involved in the regulation of immune function.

Although some of its effects are pro-inflammatory (e.g., inducing prostaglandin E_{2} production), nicotine effects are mostly anti-inflammatory. Nicotine suppresses the innate and adaptive immune response by reducing the secretion of pro-inflammatory cytokines (IL-1, IL-6, TNF-α, IL-17, IL-21, and IL-22), reducing proliferation and activation of T-cells, and suppressing the activation of dendritic cells. As a result, cell-mediated immunity against infection and neoplastic diseases is downregulated. In vitro and animal studies also showed that nicotine reduces T cell receptor (TCR) signaling and suppresses the production and secretion of antibodies.

Nicotine effects on immune system function can aggravate tumors (growth and metastases) in cancer patients and is found to have many positive effects in the treating autoimmune disease (e.g. inflammatory bowel disease/ulcerative colitis, arthritis), requiring further studies.

=== Optopharmacology ===
A photoactivatable form of nicotine, which releases nicotine when exposed to ultraviolet light with certain conditions, has been developed for studying nicotinic acetylcholine receptors in brain tissue.

=== Oral health ===
Many studies have shown the pro-inflammatory effect of nicotine on oral diseases. Nicotine promotes and aggravates some diseases such as periodontitis and gingivitis, especially when there are harmful microorganisms in the oral cavity, however, the data is insufficient, especially in vivo. Understanding the potential role of nicotine in oral health has become increasingly important given the recent introduction of novel nicotine products.

== See also ==
- 6-Chloronicotine
- Nicotine marketing
