= Anatabine =

Chemical compound

Identifiers
- IUPAC name: [2R,(+)]-1,2,3,6-Tetrahydro-2,3'-bipyridine
- CAS Number: 581-49-7
- PubChem CID: 11388
- ChemSpider: 10910
- UNII: 5PP654XB7D
- KEGG: C10126
- ChEBI: CHEBI:2705
- ChEMBL: ChEMBL3640772
- CompTox Dashboard (EPA): DTXSID901016110

Chemical and physical data
- Formula: C_{10}H_{12}N_{2}
- Molar mass: 160.220 g·mol^{−1}
- 3D model (JSmol): Interactive image
- SMILES: c1cc(cnc1)[C@@H]2CC=CCN2
- InChI: InChI=1S/C10H12N2/c1-2-7-12-10(5-1)9-4-3-6-11-8-9/h1-4,6,8,10,12H,5,7H2/t10-/m0/s1; Key:SOPPBXUYQGUQHE-JTQLQIEISA-N

Anatabine (uh-nat-uh-been,-bin) is one of the minor alkaloids found in plants in the family Solanaceae, which includes the tobacco plant and tomato. Commercial tobacco plants typically produce alkaloids at levels between 2% and 4% of total dry weight, with nicotine accounting for about 90% of the total alkaloid content, and the related compounds anatabine, nornicotine, and anabasine making up nearly all the rest. These compounds are thought to be biologically active, and part of plants' natural defense system against insects.

Anatabine has anti-inflammatory activity partly through inhibition of STAT3 phosphorylation in vitro and in vivo.

== Pharmacology ==
On a biochemical level, it appears to be active against certain nicotinic acetylcholine receptors.

== Commercial development ==
Star Scientific developed and sold the compound as a dietary supplement primarily through GNC up until mid 2014. Subsequently, Rock Creek Pharmaceuticals (formerly a subsidiary of Star Scientific), headquartered in Florida, began developing anatabine as a drug. The dietary supplements were known as Anatabloc and CigRx; the company has also marketed cosmetics with the Anatabloc brand. Rock Creek had been working on synthetic methods to scale up production of anatabine and has funded pre-clinical and clinical research in several indications.

In 2013 the FDA warned Star Scientific for unlawfully promoting CigRx and Anatabloc before anatabine was proved to be safe. Subsequently, new management and a mostly new board under the banner of Rock Creek Pharmaceuticals withdrew the dietary supplement because of the FDA's concerns.

In 2013, Star Scientific became embroiled in political scandal, when news broke that the governor of Virginia, Bob McDonnell, and his wife had received significant loans and gifts from Jonnie Williams Sr, the CEO of the company. They were found to have helped the company in several ways like arranging meetings with top officials and giving special favors from the state government. Williams resigned in 2014 and the company changed its name and restructured its board and management at the end of 2013 due to the scandal.

However, the accumulated legal costs from the defense of Jonnie Williams in the McDonnell scandal overwhelmed the company's finances and it filed for bankruptcy in 2016. As a consequence, the development and clinical trials of anatabine were halted indefinitely.

== Research ==
Anatabine has been studied in animal models and in cells to see if it might be useful for treating nicotine addiction and inflammation, and has been studied in models of diseases characterized by inflammation, such as Alzheimer's disease, thyroiditis, and multiple sclerosis. Anatabine cream was helpful in managing mild to moderate rosacea. An internet based survey showed 82% users reported a benefit from anatabine supplementation for one or more joint pain conditions.

== See also ==
- List of investigational cognition and memory disorder drugs
- Anatalline
- Anabaseine
- Myosmine
