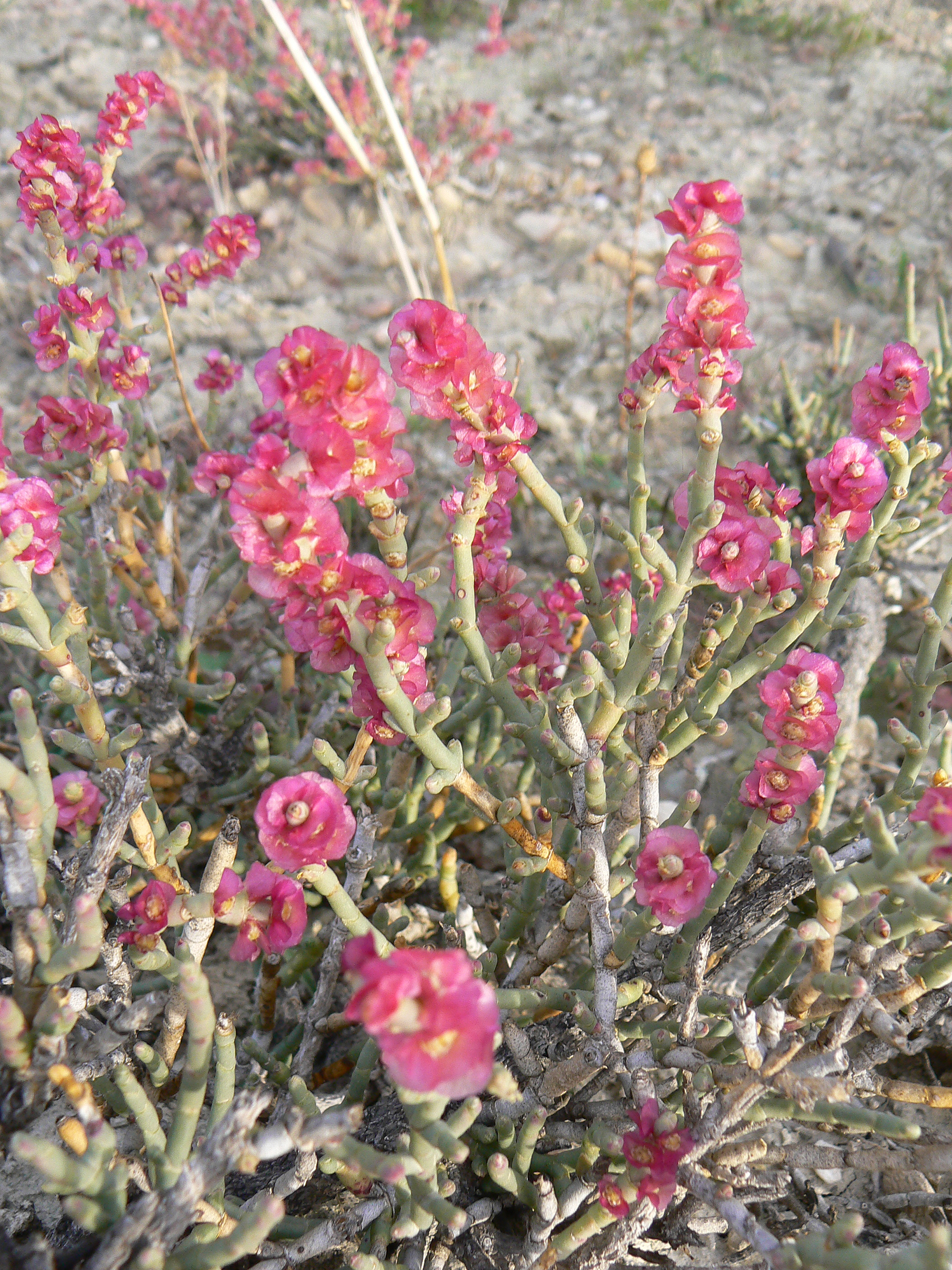
- Anabasis articulata, fruiting

Scientific classification
- Kingdom: Plantae
- Clade: Tracheophytes
- Clade: Angiosperms
- Clade: Eudicots
- Order: Caryophyllales
- Family: Amaranthaceae
- Genus: Anabasis
- Species: A. articulata

Binomial name
- Anabasis articulata (Forssk.) Moq.

= Anabasis articulata =

Species of flowering plant

Anabasis articulata is a plant of the genus Anabasis. It a salt-tolerant xerophyte that is found in the Syrian Desert. Bedouins often use the plant's ashes as a soap substitute.

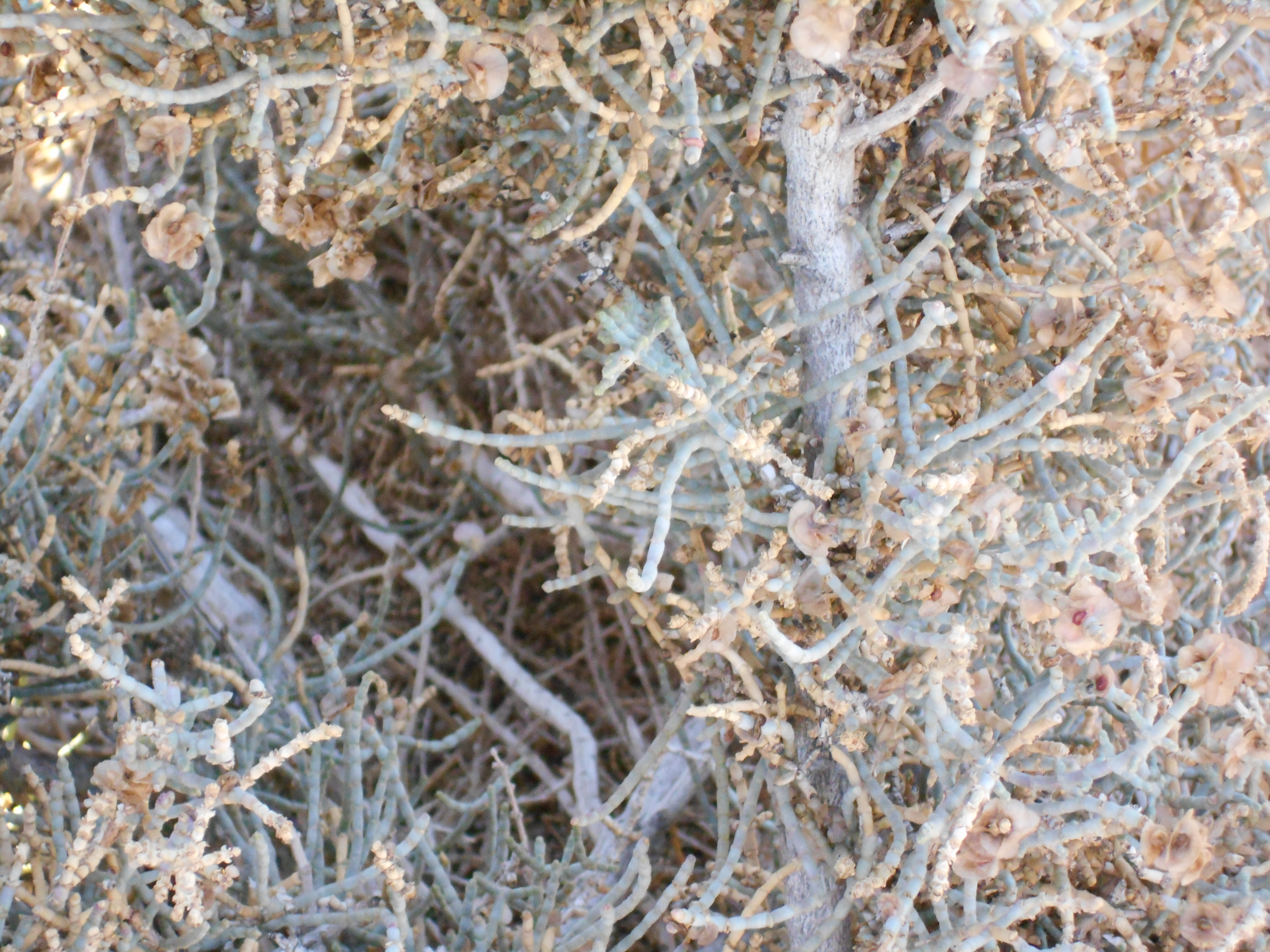
Anabasis articulata

The plant is also known for its medical properties. Algerian traditional medicine practitioners use the plants leaves to make anti-diabetic decoction.
