= TC-1698 =

Chemical compound

Legal status
- Legal status: In general: legal

Identifiers
- IUPAC name: 2-pyridin-3-yl-1-azabicyclo[3.2.2]nonane
- CAS Number: 700834-58-8
- PubChem CID: 10130417
- ChemSpider: 8305933
- UNII: NF9LS47A5E
- ChEMBL: ChEMBL2151442
- CompTox Dashboard (EPA): DTXSID40435998

Chemical and physical data
- Formula: C_{13}H_{18}N_{2}
- Molar mass: 202.301 g·mol^{−1}
- 3D model (JSmol): Interactive image
- SMILES: c2ncccc2C1CCC3CCN1CC3
- InChI: InChI=1S/C13H18N2/c1-2-12(10-14-7-1)13-4-3-11-5-8-15(13)9-6-11/h1-2,7,10-11,13H,3-6,8-9H2; Key:WIEWCOLOPGXZDJ-UHFFFAOYSA-N

TC-1698 is a drug developed by Targacept which acts as a partial agonist for the α7 subtype of neural nicotinic acetylcholine receptors. It has neuroprotective effects in animal studies, and has been used as a lead compound to find further potent derivatives.

== See also ==
- Anabasine
- Epibatidine
