= Jean Nicot =

French diplomat and scholar (1530–1604)

Jean Villemain
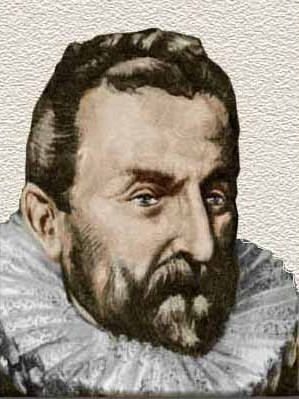
- 19th-century engraving of Jean Nicot (1530-1600)

France Ambassador to Portugal
- In office 1559–1571
- Monarchs: Henry II; Francis II; Charles IX

Personal details
- Born: 1530 Nîmes, Languedoc, France
- Died: 4 May 1604 (aged 73–74) Paris, France
- Relatives: Filipe de Brito e Nicote (nephew)

Jean Nicot de Villemain (French: [ʒɑ̃ niko də vilmɛ̃]; 1530 – 4 May 1604) was a French diplomat and scholar. He is famous for being the first to bring tobacco to France, including snuff tobacco. Nicotine is named after the tobacco plant Nicotiana tabacum, which in turn is named after Jean Nicot de Villemain, who sent tobacco and seeds to Paris in 1560, presented it to the King Francis II, and who promoted their medicinal use. Smoking was believed to protect against illness, particularly the plague.

== Early life ==
Jean Nicot was born in 1530 in Nîmes, in the south of France. His father was a notary. He was educated in Toulouse and Paris.

== Career ==
At 29 years old in 1559, he was sent from France to Portugal to negotiate the marriage of six-year-old princess Margaret of Valois to five-year-old King Sebastian of Portugal. Nicot served as the French ambassador in Lisbon, Portugal in 1559 under Henry II, under king Francis II in 1559 - 1560, and from 1560 to 1561 under Charles IX.

=== Introduction of tobacco ===
When Nicot returned, he brought tobacco plants. He introduced snuff tobacco to the French royal court. The plant was also an instant success with the Father Superior of Malta, who shared tobacco with all of his monks. More and more of the fashionable people of Paris began to use the plant, making Nicot a celebrity.

Although André Thevet argued that he had introduced tobacco to France, the plant was called Nicotina. But nicotine later came to refer specifically to the particular chemical in the plant. The tobacco plant, Nicotiana, also a flowering garden plant, was named after him by Carl Linnaeus, as was nicotine. Nicot described its believed medicinal properties (1559) and sent it as a medicine to the French court.

=== French dictionary ===
For his service to the French royal court, Nicot was given the name 'de Villemain' and land near Brie-Comte-Robert. There, he compiled one of the first French dictionaries, Thresor de la langue françoyse tant ancienne que moderne (published in 1606). His dictionary, according to Ibram X. Kendi, was the first that included an entry for the concept of race. The IETF language tags have registered frm-1606nict for "16th century French as in Jean Nicot, 'Thresor de la langue francoyse', 1606, but also including some French similar to that of Rabelais".

== Death ==
He died on May 4, 1604, in Paris, France.
