= GTS-21 =

Chemical compound

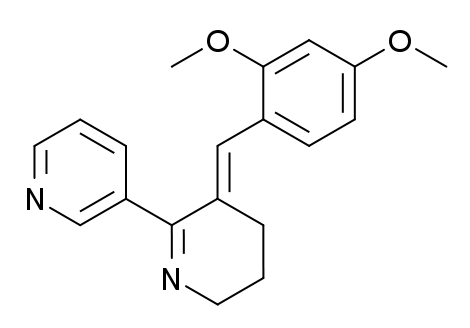

Clinical data
- Other names: 3-(2,4-dimethoxy-benzylidene)anabaseine

Identifiers
- IUPAC name: (3E)-3-(2,4-Dimethoxybenzylidene)-3,4,5,6-tetrahydro-2,3'-bipyridine
- CAS Number: 148372-04-7
- PubChem CID: 5310985
- ChemSpider: 4470526
- UNII: 8S399XDN2K
- CompTox Dashboard (EPA): DTXSID701027513

Chemical and physical data
- Formula: C_{19}H_{20}N_{2}O_{2}
- Molar mass: 308.381 g·mol^{−1}
- 3D model (JSmol): Interactive image
- SMILES: COc2cc(OC)ccc2C=C1CCCN=C1c3cnccc3
- InChI: InChI=1S/C19H20N2O2/c1-22-17-8-7-14(18(12-17)23-2)11-15-5-4-10-21-19(15)16-6-3-9-20-13-16/h3,6-9,11-13H,4-5,10H2,1-2H3/b15-11+; Key:RPYWXZCFYPVCNQ-RVDMUPIBSA-N

GTS-21 (also known as DMXBA or DMBX-anabaseine) is an investigational new drug being studied for the treatment of neurodegenerative diseases and psychiatric disorders, as well as for its potential to enhance memory and cognitive function. Despite study of the molecule since 1990s, as of 2025 it has not been shown to be effective in clinical trials.

GTS-21 is a derivative of the natural product anabaseine that acts as a partial agonist at neural nicotinic acetylcholine receptors (nAChRs). It binds to both the α4β2 and α7 subtypes, but activates only the α7 to any significant extent. Activation of the α7 nAChR has been shown to have neuroprotective effects which has made GTS-21 a focus of research in the treatment of neurological diseases.

The laboratory name GTS-21 means that it was the 21st chemical compound created by Gainesville (University of Florida in Gainesville) and Tokushima (Taiho Pharmaceutical) Scientists while DMXBA stands for 3–2,4-dimethoxybenzylidene anabaseine.

== Research and clinical trial history ==
In early research in the 1990s, GTS-21 and its active metabolites were shown to improve cognition in healthy adult men (nootropic effect) as well as neuroprotective effects in animal models and neuronal cell cultures. The results of early studies led to GTS-21 being investigated for the treatment of Alzheimer's disease, nicotine dependence, and for schizophrenia.

Despite promising early research, clinical trials using GTS-21 have failed to show clinically significant efficacy and, as of 2025, no trial has proceeded beyond phase 2. Trials using DMXBA to treat schizophrenia were completed in the 2000s but these trials were discontinued during phase II. More recent trials focusing on other neurological diseases including Alzheimer's, Autism, ADHD, and nicotine use have also been discontinued or withdrawn.

== See also ==
- List of investigational cognition and memory disorder drugs
