= Ricinine =

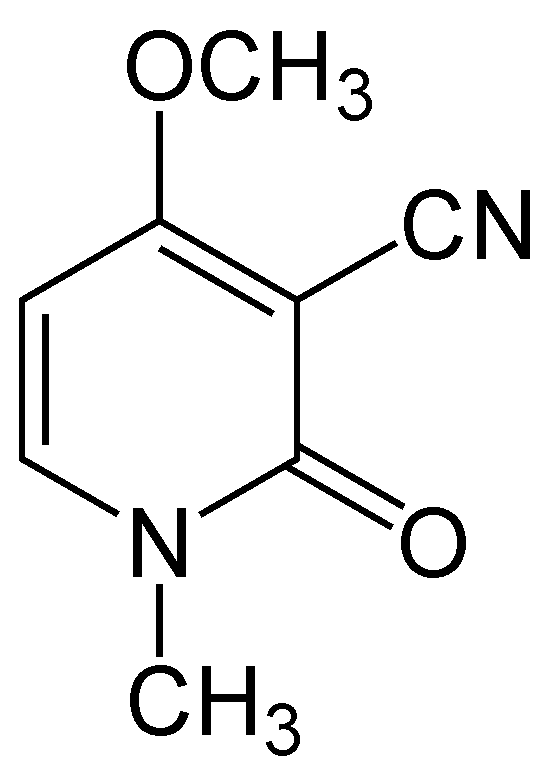

Names
- Preferred IUPAC name 4-Methoxy-1-methyl-2-oxo-1,2-dihydropyridine-3-carbonitrile
- Other names 3-cyano-4-methoxy-N-methyl-2-pyridone

Identifiers
CAS Number	524-40-3
3D model (JSmol)	Interactive image
ChEBI	CHEBI:18043
ChEMBL	ChEMBL1329957
ChemSpider	10216
ECHA InfoCard	100.007.601
EC Number	208-359-7
KEGG	C01526
PubChem CID	10666
UNII	130UFS7AE0
CompTox Dashboard (EPA)	DTXSID50200412
- InChI: InChI=1S/C8H8N2O2/c1-10-4-3-7(12-2)6(5-9)8(10)11/h3-4H,1-2H3 Key: PETSAYFQSGAEQY-UHFFFAOYSA-N
- SMILES: Cn1ccc(c(c1=O)C#N)OC

Properties
Chemical formula	C_{8}H_{8}N_{2}O_{2}
Molar mass	164.164 g·mol^{−1}
Melting point	200 °C (392 °F; 473 K)

Hazards
- Lethal dose or concentration (LD, LC)
LD_{50} (median dose)	340 mg/kg
- Except where otherwise noted, data are given for materials in their standard state (at 25 °C [77 °F], 100 kPa). Infobox references

Ricinine is a toxic alkaloid found in the castor plant. It can serve as a biomarker of ricin poisoning. It was first isolated from the castor seeds by Tuson in 1864. Compared to ricin, it is very poorly studied, since unlike ricin, ricinine has essentially no biological effect on humans.

Ricinine has insecticidal effects.

It sublimes between 170 and 180 °C at 20 mmHg. It does not form salts, and is precipitated in iodine or mercuric chloride solutions, but not in Mayer's reagent.

It can be hydrolyzed to methanol and ricininic acid by alkali.

== See also ==
- Ricin
