= Anabasine =

Chemical compound

Clinical data
- Other names: (–)-Anabsine; (S)-Anabasine; Neonicotine
- Drug class: Nicotinic acetylcholine receptor agonist
- ATC code: None

Identifiers
- IUPAC name: 3-[(2S)-piperidin-2-yl]pyridine
- CAS Number: 494-52-0
- PubChem CID: 205586
- ChemSpider: 178119
- UNII: LMS11II2LO
- KEGG: C11357
- ChEBI: CHEBI:74
- ChEMBL: ChEMBL1526229
- CompTox Dashboard (EPA): DTXSID9041607
- ECHA InfoCard: 100.007.084 100.150.777, 100.007.084

Chemical and physical data
- Formula: C_{10}H_{14}N_{2}
- Molar mass: 162.236 g·mol^{−1}
- 3D model (JSmol): Interactive image
- SMILES: C1CCN[C@@H](C1)C2=CN=CC=C2
- InChI: InChI=1S/C10H14N2/c1-2-7-12-10(5-1)9-4-3-6-11-8-9/h3-4,6,8,10,12H,1-2,5,7H2/t10-/m0/s1; Key:MTXSIJUGVMTTMU-JTQLQIEISA-N

Anabasine is a pyridine and piperidine alkaloid found in the tree tobacco (Nicotiana glauca) plant, as well as in tree tobacco's close relative the common tobacco plant (Nicotiana tabacum). It is a structural isomer of, and chemically similar to, nicotine. It has been used as an insecticide.

Anabasine is present in trace amounts in tobacco smoke, and can be used as an indicator of a person's exposure to tobacco smoke.

== Pharmacology ==
Anabasine is a nicotinic acetylcholine receptor agonist. In high doses, it produces a depolarizing block of nerve transmission, which can cause symptoms similar to those of nicotine poisoning and, ultimately, death by asystole. In larger amounts it is thought to be teratogenic in swine.

The intravenous LD_{50} of anabasine ranges from 11 mg/kg to 16 mg/kg in mice, depending on the enantiomer.

== Analogs ==
B. Bhatti, et al. made some higher potency sterically strained bicyclic analogs of anabasine such as 2-(pyridin-3-yl)-1-azabicyclo[3.2.2]nonane (TC-1698)

== See also ==
- Anatabine
