= Encenicline =

Chemical compound

Clinical data
- ATC code: None

Identifiers
- IUPAC name: N-[(3R)-1-Azabicyclo[2.2.2]oct-3-yl]-7-chloro-1-benzothiophene-2-carboxamide
- CAS Number: 550999-75-2
- PubChem CID: 46196517
- ChemSpider: 28637768
- UNII: 5FI5376A0X
- KEGG: D10626
- ChEMBL: ChEMBL2151572
- CompTox Dashboard (EPA): DTXSID701025836

Chemical and physical data
- Formula: C_{16}H_{17}ClN_{2}OS
- Molar mass: 320.83 g·mol^{−1}
- 3D model (JSmol): Interactive image
- SMILES: c1cc2cc(sc2c(c1)Cl)C(=O)N[C@H]3CN4CCC3CC4
- InChI: InChI=1S/C16H17ClN2OS/c17-12-3-1-2-11-8-14(21-15(11)12)16(20)18-13-9-19-6-4-10(13)5-7-19/h1-3,8,10,13H,4-7,9H2,(H,18,20)/t13-/m0/s1; Key:SSRDSYXGYPJKRR-ZDUSSCGKSA-N

Encenicline (INN, USAN, code names EVP-6124, MT-4666) is a selective partial agonist of the α7 nicotinic receptor. It was in phase III clinical trials for the treatment of cognitive impairment in schizophrenia, but failed to meet the study endpoints in 2016.

FORUM Pharmaceuticals, who as of 2015 was subjecting the drug to the FDA approval process, had all studies suspended until further notice in late 2015 due to rare, but serious gastrointestinal problems occurring in patients participating in the drug trial, potentially being a consequence of taking the drug. The trials were scheduled to be run until January 2017, but as of December 2016, they appear to still be on hold. There is speculation by FORUM Pharmaceuticals that this may be due to either the increased daily dose given in the phase III trial compared to earlier trials that showed promise. In previous trials, the highest dose given was 2 mg/day, with the most positive of effects having been realized in patients taking the largest dose (2 mg/day). In the phase III trial, all patients were treated with 3 mg/day doses of the drug. FORUM also speculates that the increase of gastrointestinal problems occurring in the phase III trial could be due to the increased demographic risk that elderly (the average age in the study was 75) and those with Alzheimer's disease have in regard to gastrointestinal issues, citing another study they conducted with a younger demographic (in which the average age was 35–40) for the treatment of schizophrenia of 1,500 individuals in which there were zero complains of gastrointestinal problems.

== See also ==
- List of investigational cognition and memory disorder drugs
- AR-R17779
- AZD0328
- Bradanicline
- GTS-21
- PHA-543,613
- PNU-282,987
- SSR-180,711
- TC-1698
- WAY-317,538
