= Nicotinic agonist =

Drug that binds to and activates nicotinic acetylcholine receptors

A nicotinic agonist is a drug that mimics the action of acetylcholine (ACh) at nicotinic acetylcholine receptors (nAChRs). The nAChR is named for its affinity for nicotine.

Examples include nicotine (by definition), acetylcholine (the endogenous agonist of nAChRs), choline, epibatidine, lobeline, varenicline and cytisine.

== History ==
Chemical structure of ABT-418

Nicotine has been known for centuries for its intoxicating effect. It was first isolated in 1828 from the tobacco plant by German chemists Posselt and Reimann.

The discovery of positive effects from nicotine on animal memory was discovered by in vivo studies in the mid 1980s. That research led to a new era in studies of nicotinic acetylcholine receptors (nAChR) and their stimulation but until then the focus had mainly been on nicotine addiction. The development of nAChR agonists began in the early 1990s after the discovery of nicotine's positive effects. Some research showed a possible therapy option in preclinical studies. ABT-418 was one of the first in a series of nAChR agonists and it was designed by Abbott Labs. ABT-418 showed significant increase of delayed matching-to-sample (DMTS) performance in matured macaque apes of different species and sex. ABT-418 has also been examined as a possible treatment to Alzheimer's disease, Parkinson's disease and attention-deficit hyperactivity disorder: those experiments showed positive outcomes.

One of the first nAChR active compounds, besides nicotine, that was marketed as a drug was galantamine, a plant alkaloid that works as a weak cholinesterase inhibitor (IC50 = 5 μM) as well as an allosteric sensitizer for nAChRs (EC50=50 nM).

== Nicotinic acetylcholine receptors and their signaling system ==
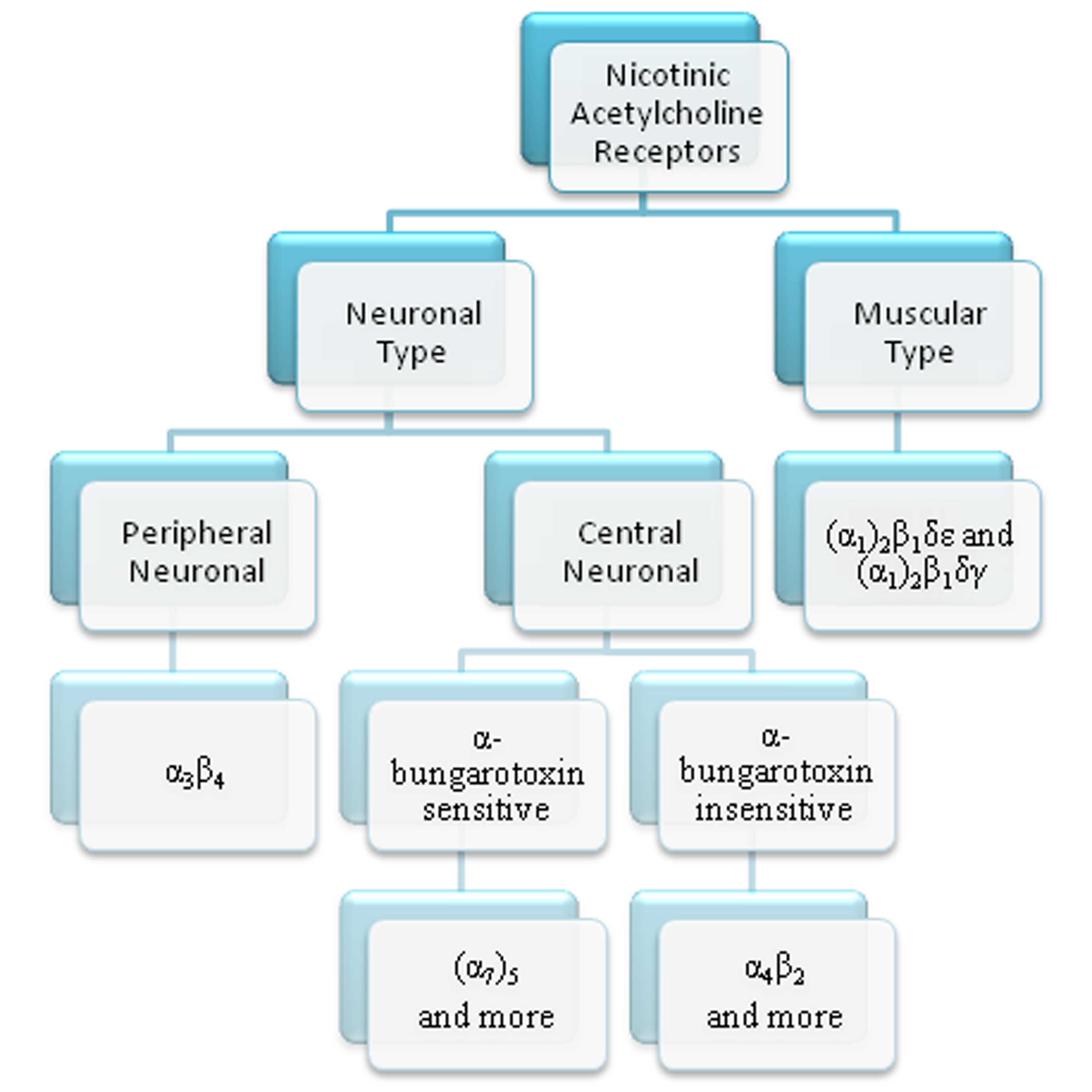
Nicotinic acetylcholine receptor classification

=== Signaling system ===
In the human nervous system nicotinic cholinergic signals are extended throughout the system, where the neurotransmitter acetylcholine (ACh) plays a key role in activating ligand-gated ion channels. The cholinergic system is a vital nervous pathway, where cholinergic neurons synthesize, store and release the neurotransmitter ACh. The main receptors that convert the ACh messages are the cholinergic muscarinic acetylcholine receptors, neuronal and muscular nAChRs. When looking back at evolutionary history, ACh is considered to be the oldest transmitter molecule and became present before the nervous cell. In the nervous system cholinergic stimulation mediated through nAChRs controls pathways such as release of transmitters and cell sensitivity, which can influence physiological activity including sleep, anxiety, processing of pain and cognitive functions.

=== Nicotinic acetylcholine receptors ===
nAChRs are cholinergic receptors found in the central nervous system (CNS), peripheral nervous systems (PNS) and skeletal muscles, these receptors are ligand-gated ion channels with binding sites for acetylcholine and other molecules. When ACh or other agonists bind to the receptors it stabilizes the open state of the ion channel allowing influx of cations such as potassium, calcium and sodium ions. The nAChRs are made up by different subunits which determine the quaternary structure of the receptor, those subunits are α subunits (α1−α10), β subunits (β1−β4), one δ subunits, one γ subunit and one ε subunit. nAChRs can be either heteromeric or homomeric. The heteromeric receptors found in the central nervous system are made up by two α subunits and three β subunits with the binding site at the interface of α and the adjacent subunit. These receptors contain two binding sites per receptor and have different affinity for chemicals based on the composition of subunits. Both binding sites work together and thus, both sites need to be occupied with a nAChR agonist so that channel activation can take place. nAChRs containing α2−α6 and β2−β4 subunits have been shown to have higher affinity for ACh than other receptors. Homomeric receptors contain 5 identical subunits, they have 5 binding sites located at the interface between two adjacent subunits. In the year 2000 two homomeric receptors had been identified in humans, the α7 and α8 receptors.

=== Binding site ===
There are two binding sites on heteromeric nAChRs; to stabilize the open form of nAChRs, both binding sites must be occupied by agonist, such as nicotine or ACh.
The ACh binding site of nAChR is made up by six loops, termed A–F. The A, B and C loops of the binding site are part of the α subunit and are the principal components of the binding site. The adjacent subunit to the α subunit (γ, δ, ε or β) contains the D, E and F loops.

== Mechanism of action ==
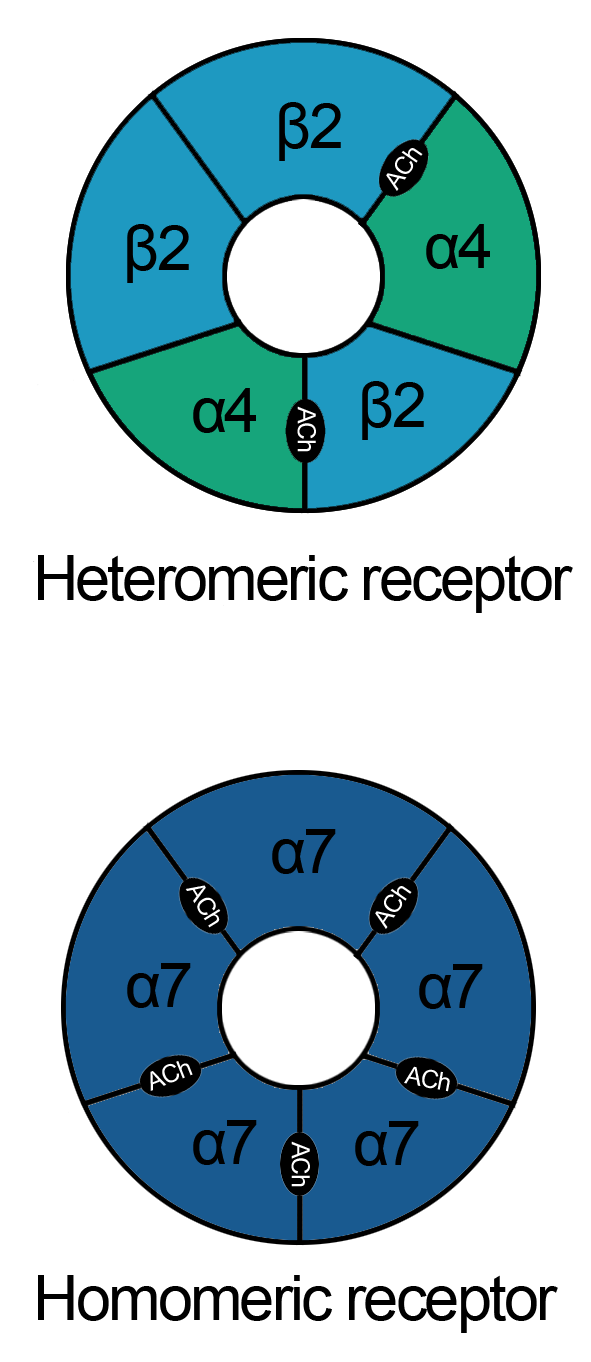
Two different subtypes of nicotinic acetylcholine receptors

=== α4β2 receptor agonists ===
α4β2 nAChRs contain two α4 subunits and three β2 subunits, therefore it has two binding sites for ACh and other agonists. α4β2 nAChRs account for approximately 90% of the nAChRs in the human brain and when chronically exposed to nicotine or other nicotine agonists leads to increase in density of α4β2 receptors which is the opposite of what usually happens when other receptors are chronically exposed to their agonists. The α4β2 receptor has been widely studied in regards to Alzheimer's disease as well as for nicotine dependence and in 2009 several drugs are on the market that target the α4β2 nAChR specifically.

=== α7 receptor agonists ===
α7 receptors are homomeric neuronal acetylcholine receptors consisting of five α7 subunits and has five ACh binding sites. Abnormality in the α7 receptors expression have been reported to influence progression of diseases such as Alzheimer's disease and schizophrenia. The α7 are not believed to have as much affinity for nicotine as the heteromeric receptor but instead they have shown more affinity for alpha bungarotoxin which is a nicotinic antagonist found in venom of some snakes. Targeting of α7 receptors is therefore thought to be useful in treatment of Alzheimer's disease and schizophrenia.

=== Muscle type receptor agonists ===
nAChR are found in the neuromuscular junction on skeletal muscles. Two different receptors have been found, one of which has primarily been found in adults contains two α1 subunits, one β1, one ε and one δ, the other one has been found in fetuses and contains γ subunit instead of the ε subunit. The nAChRs take part in the depolarization of the muscular endplate by increasing cation permeability leading to contraction of skeletal muscles. The nAChRs found in the skeletal muscle system have two ACh binding sites, one of which is found at the interface between α1 and δ subunits while the other one is found at the interface between α1 and γ or ε subunits. Among nAChR antagonists designed specifically for the neuromuscular system are nerve gases and other poisons designed to quickly kill humans or other animals and insects.

=== Binding ===
ACh binds to nAChR because of charge difference between the molecule and the surface of the receptor. When binding to nAChR ACh fits into a binding pocket shaped by loops A, B and C which belong to α subunit and the adjacent subunit. When ACh is fitted into the binding pocket the loops of the nAChR undergo movement that leads to a coordination of the ACh molecule in the pocket enhancing the chemical bonds between the molecule and the receptor. After movement of the loops that belong to α subunit it's sometimes possible for the ACh molecule to form a bond, e.g. salt bridge, to the adjacent subunit enhancing the bonds between the receptor and ACh even further.

== Drug design ==
Drugs which influence nAChRs are typically agonists, partial agonists or antagonists. However, some nAChR agonists - such as nicotine - act as depolarizing agents in a time-dependent manner (seconds or minutes) relative to concentration and nAChR subtype. Chronic exposure to some agonists can lead to long-lasting functional deactivation resulting from rapid and persistent desensitization. Partial nAChR agonists have been investigated as potential smoking cessation agents; believed to bind to nAChRs and stimulate the release of dopamine in smaller doses than that achieved by full agonists, and in the absence of nicotine.

The lack of specificity among some nicotinic agonists - or nonspecific agonists - is well documented as a conflating factor for treating illnesses which require selectivity for specific nAChR subtypes. Many nonspecific agonists - such as ACh, nicotine and epibatidine - have been shown to target more than one subtype.

=== Pharmacophore ===
Chemical structure of nicotine

The development of pharmacophore, an nAChR agonist, in 1970 suggested its receptor-binding activity depended on the presence of a positively charged nitrogen atom and hydrogen-bonding capacity conferred by either a carbonyl or nitro group - i.e., the carbonyl oxygen in acetylcholine or nitrogen in (S)-nicotine. Recent investigations have elucidated the structural and Stereochemical elements responsible for the binding capacity and potency of pharmacophore; the presence of a cationic centre and electronegative atoms able to form hydrogen bonds with the center of the pyridine ring in (S)-nicotine confer greater binding affinity, while the (S)-enantiomer is 10-100 times more potent than its (R) conformer.

The azabicyclic ring of epibatidine also affords favorable steric interactions with nAChR receptor, due to its specific internitrogen distance, N^{+}-N, which has been proposed as a significant factor for agonist affinity, however, some debate remains as to its influence. Contemporary theories suggest a 7-8 Å difference between points complementing the protonated nitrogen atom and hydrogen-bond acceptor could enhance potency. Low electronic density near the protonated nitrogen and higher electron density toward the pyridine ring is favourable in protonated nicotine ligands containing pyridine ring.

Recent research has focussed on the α7 and α4β2 receptor subtypes for the development of drugs to treat nicotine dependence and cognitive impairment, such as Alzheimer's disease.

=== Structure-activity relationships ===
==== Structure-activity relationships: Muscle nAChR agonists ====
Various models have been used to test the affinity of nAChR agonists for receptor subtypes by identifying the molecules and their structures - i.e., constituent groups and steric conformation - which confer greater affinity. By using a model for the nAChR muscle receptor subtype (α1)_{2}β1δγ, the following results were obtained:

anatoxin > epibatidine > acetylcholine > DMPP > cytisine > pyrantel > nicotine > coniine > tubocurare > lobeline,

where anatoxin had the highest activity efficacy, and tubocurare the lowest. In contrast, Acetylcholine induced a much longer opening time of the receptor, however, anatoxin proved more potent. These results suggest anatoxin derivatives could be improve understanding of structure-activity relationships (SAR) for muscle nAChRs.

Succinylcholine chloride, which is a drug that's already on the market, is a bischoline ester and a short acting muscle relaxant. Bischoline esters are compounds that can act as a competitive agonist on muscle type nAChRs and have been used in SAR studies. In a Torpedo (α1)_{2}β1δγ nAChR model it was demonstrated that the potency of bischoline ester agonists is dependent on the chain length as potency increases with longer chains. Efficacy seems to be independent of chain length since the highest efficacy is seen in bischoline esters with four to seven CH_{2} units and is lower for both fewer CH_{2} units and more.

==== Structure-activity relationships: α4β2 nAChR agonists ====
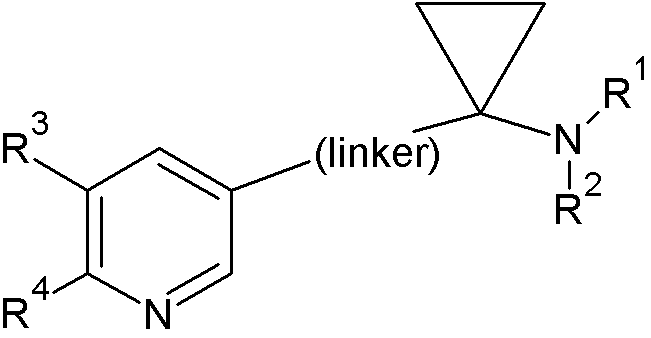
Pyridin cyclopropan derivatives

Combining the structural elements of ACh and nicotine, thus reducing conformational flexibility with a cyclopropane ring, has led to the discovery of potent and selective α4β2 nAChR ligands. Modulation of three structural elements - the linker, and substitution of either the amino group or pyridine ring - can be used to determine the influence of ligands on potency and selectivity.

Factors which inhibit binding include steric hindrance within the amino group and/or saturated/unsaturated carbon-chain linkers - hence the preference for short-chained ether linkers. Increased binding affinity is often achieved if the pyridine ring is either mono- or di-substituted with halogens. Substitution on the amino group with three different amides increased binding; where methylamide had the greatest, other substituted amides showed a decrease in binding affinity due to steric hindrance and/or absence of a methyl group resulting in the loss of hydrophobic interactivity. The stereochemistry of pyridine nitrogen and/or the pyridine ring, qua stereoelectronic effects, show positive, albeit subtle effects on binding to α4β2 nAChR. A pyridyl ether ligand with a bromo-substituted pyridine, and metylatedamide-subtituted amino group exhibited the highest potency.

==== Structure-activity relationships: α7 nAChR agonists ====
SEN12333/WAY-317538

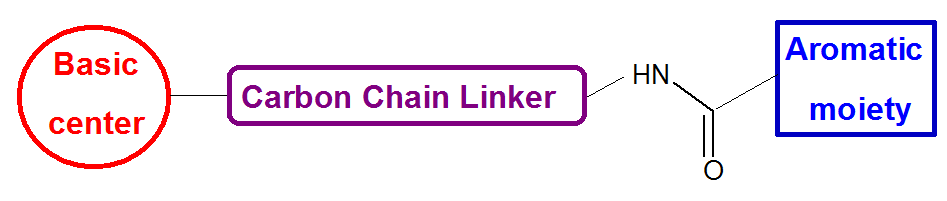
Structure activity relationship model for α_{7} agonists

The search for selective and potent α7 nAChR agonists has produced a number of potential drug candidates; i.e., SEN12333/WAY-317538, and other compounds with desirable pharmacokinetic profiles, for which structure-activity relationships have been proposed, show selectivity for α7 nAChRs (versus α1, α3 and α4β2 nAChRs).

The optimal pharmacophore of α7 nAChR agonist comprises a basic moiety attached via a carbon chain linked via an amide bridge to an aromatic moiety. The amide bridge can be inverted without affecting the potency of the agonist. Biaryl groups show more potency than monoaryl groups due to the presence of and aromatic moiety and biaryl aryl group substitution at position 2; potency is higher for agonists with an H^{+} donor/acceptor on the biaryl aryl group. Higher numbers of hydrogen bond acceptors likely decrease permeability across the blood–brain barrier (BBB) due to the polar surface area, and need to be taken into account when designing agonists targeting α7 nAChRs.

Various cyclic amine groups - for example aryl piperazine, piperidine and morpholine - can be used as the basic moiety, while having limited affect on agonist potency. Acyclic tertiary amines are well sufficient as basic moieties, however larger groups negatively affect tolerability due to their sterics.

Many derivatives of quinuclidine - such as quinuclidine amide - are known to be α7 nAChR agonists. SAR studies for quinuclidine amide have identified factors affecting potency and affinity of these agonists. Para-substitution of the quinuclidine ring, and a 3-(R) stereochemical configuration are favored. Enhanced activity is observed when a 5 membered ring is fused to aromatic moiety. Further enhancement can be achieved if the fused ring supplies electron resonance to the amide carbonyl, whereas activity is diminished if the ring contains hydrogen-bond donors.

The rigidity of quinuclidine and orthogonality of the nitrogen bridge relative to the amide carbonyl has been proposed as important for optimal binding. The stability of quinuclidine amide - a more potent derivative - in rat in vitro models were low, however, the addition of a methyl group to position 2 on the quinuclidine ring significantly increased its stability.

== Drug development ==
The development of nicotinic acetylcholine receptor agonists began in the early 1990s after the discovery of nicotine's positive effects on animal memory. The development of nicotinic acetylcholine receptor agonists has come a long way since then. Nicotinic acetylcholine receptor agonists are gaining increasing attention as drug candidates for multiple central nervous system disorders such as Alzheimer's disease, schizophrenia, attention-deficit hyperactivity disorder (ADHD) and nicotine addiction. Nicotinic acetylcholine receptors are receptors found in the central nervous system, the peripheral nervous systems and skeletal muscles. They are ligand-gated ion channels with binding sites for acetylcholine as well as other agonists. When agonists bind to a receptor it stabilizes the open state of the ion channel allowing influx of cations.

In 2009 there were at least five drugs on the market that affect the nicotinic acetylcholine receptors.

Quinuclidine derivatives
Quinuclidine carbamates	Quinuclidine amides	Quinuclidine ethers

== Nicotine Agonist Drug ==
Active ingredient	Product name	Chemical name	Pharmaceutical form	Pharmacodynamic properties	Therapeutic use	Structure
Varenicline tartrate	Champix, Chantix	7,8,9,10-tetrahydro-6,10-methano-6H-pyrazino[2,3-h][3]benzazepine	Film coated tablet	Partial agonist of the nicotinic acetylcholine receptor, subtype α_{4}β_{2}	Treatment of tobacco dependence
Galantamine hydrobromide	Reminyl, Nivalin, Razadyne and Razadyn ER	4a,5,9,10,11,12-hexahydro-3-methoxy-11-methyl-6H-benzofuro[3a,3,2-ef][2]-benzazepin-6-ol	Sustained release capsule, film coated tablet, oral solution	Cholinesterase inhibitor and a noncompetitive agonist of the nicotinic acetylcholine receptor	Treatment of dementia caused by Alzheimer's disease
Nicotine	Nicorette, Nicotinell, Niquitin, Boots NicAssist, Commit, Habitrol, Nicoderm CQ, Nicotrol, Thrive	3-[(2S)-1-methylpyrrolidine-2-yl]pyridine	Transdermal patch, gum, inhaler, nasal spray, lozenge, microtab, and is naturally found in tobacco	Agonist of the nicotinic receptor, both Ganglion type and α_{4}β_{2}	Treatment of tobacco dependence
Carbachol	Miostat	2-[(aminocarbonyl)oxy]-N,N,N-trimethylethanaminium	Intraocular solution	Cholinergic agonist	Treatment of glaucoma
Suxamethonium chloride (Succinylcholine chloride)	Anectine, Quelicin Suxamethonium Chloride	2,2'-[(1,4-dioxobutane-1,4-diyl)bis(oxy)]bis(N,N,N-trimethylethanaminium)	Intravenous or intramuscular injection	Depolarizing neuromuscular blocking agent	Short acting muscle relaxant
Epibatidine	Not listed	2-(6-chloropyridin-3-yl)-7-azabicyclo[2.2.1]heptane	Not listed	Agonist of the nicotinic acetylcholine receptor	Not used as a drug

Other nicotinic agonists, albeit generally with limited clinical use, include:

- lobeline, an agonist on Ganglion type nicotinic receptors and also affects sensory nerve terminals
- epibatidine, an agonist on Ganglion type, α4β2 and α7 receptors
- decamethonium causes depolarization block on muscle type receptors, similarly to suxamethonium

== Nicotinic versus muscarinic activity ==
Comparison of cholinergic agonists
Substance	Receptor specificity		Hydrolysis by acetylcholinesterase	Comments
Substance	Muscarinic	Nicotinic	Hydrolysis by acetylcholinesterase	Comments
Choline	+++	+++	++	Essential nutrient
Acetylcholine	+++	+++	+++	Endogenous ligand
Carbachol	++	+++	-	Used in the treatment of glaucoma
Methacholine	+++	+	++	
Bethanechol	+++	-	-	Used in bladder and gastrointestinal hypotonia.
Muscarine	+++	-	-	Natural alkaloid found in certain mushrooms. Cause of mushroom poisoning
Nicotine	-	+++	-	Natural alkaloid found in the tobacco plant.
Pilocarpine	++	-	-	Used in glaucoma
Oxotremorine	++	-	-	

== Current status ==
Currently nicotine receptor agonist research and drug designing is aimed for treatment of multiple diseases and disorders of the CNS.

Targacept has three drug candidates that are in clinical trials; AZD3480 (TC-1734) for ADHD which is currently in phase II clinical trials, AZD1446 (TC-6683) for Alzheimer's disease in collaboration with AstraZeneca and TC-5619 for cognitive dysfunctions in schizophrenia.

Memory pharmaceuticals with its partner Roche has one drug candidate, MEM 3454 (RG3487), a partial agonist of the nicotinic α7 receptor, for Alzheimer's disease.

Abbott Laboratories in partnership with NeuroSearch have two drug candidates in clinical trials, ABT-894, a selective α4β2 nicotine receptor agonist, for ADHD and ABT-560, a neuronal nicotinic receptor modulator, which was selected by Abbott in 2006 as a new development candidate for cognitive dysfunctions.

EnVivo pharmaceuticals has one drug candidate in clinical trials, EVP-6124, a selective α7 nicotine receptor agonist for Alzheimer's disease and schizophrenia and one follow-up compound, EVP-4473, that has successfully completed pre-clinical development.

== See also ==
- Encenicline
- Muscarinic acetylcholine receptor
- Muscarinic agonist
- Muscarinic antagonist
- Nicotinic acetylcholine receptor
- Nicotinic antagonist
- Parasympathomimetic drug
- Tebanicline
