= C15H17N3O2 =

The molecular formula C_{15}H_{17}N_{3}O_{2} (molar mass: 271.32 g/mol) may refer to:

- Famiraprinium
- PHA-543,613
