= C14H22N2O =

The molecular formula C_{14}H_{22}N_{2}O (molar mass: 234.34 g/mol, exact mass: 234.1732 u) may refer to:

- Lidocaine, or lignocaine
- Ispronicline (TC-1734, AZD-3480)
