= List of investigational cognition and memory disorder drugs =

Investigational cognition and memory disorder drugs

This is a list of investigational cognition and memory disorder drugs, or drugs that are currently under development for clinical use for the treatment of cognition disorders and/or memory disorders but are not yet approved.

Chemical/generic names are listed first, with developmental code names, synonyms, and brand names in parentheses. The format of list items is "Name (Synonyms) – Mechanism of Action [Reference]".

This list was last comprehensively updated in June 2026. It is likely to become outdated with time.

== Under development ==
=== Phase 2 ===
- Anhydrous enol oxaloacetate (AEO; oxaloacetate) – oxaloacetate replacement
- Cenicriviroc (CVC; TAK-652; TBR-652) – C-C chemokine CCR_{2} and CCR_{5} receptor antagonist
- CN-105 – apolipoprotein E (ApoE) agonist
- CORT-108297 (ADS-108297) – glucocorticoid receptor antagonist
- CST-2032 – β_{2}-adrenergic receptor agonist
- Everolimus (Absorb; Absorb BVS; Affinitor; Affinitor Dispersible; Afinitor; Afinitor Disperz; Certican; Esprit BTK; Esprit BVS; Promus; Promus Element; Promus Premier; RAD; RAD-001; SDZ RAD; Synergy; Votubia; Xience nano; Xience Prime; Xience V; Xience Xpedition; Zortress) – mechanistic target of rapamycin (mTOR) inhibitor
- Florbetapir F 18 (^{18}F-AV-45; Amyloid imaging agent; Amyvid; AV-45; Florbetapir (18F); Florpiramine F 18) – imaging enhancer (diagnosis)
- Flortaucipir F 18 (18F-AV-1451; [18F]-T-807; [3H]AV 1451; [F-18]T807; [F18]AV1451; Fluorine 18 AV 1451; LY3191748; T807; Tauvid) – imaging enhancer (diagnosis)
- Iclepertin (BI-425809) – glycine transporter 1 (GlyT1) inhibitor
- Inidascamine (FSV7-007; RL-007) – undefined mechanism of action (acts on cholinergic, ionotropic glutamate NMDA, and GABA_{B} receptor systems)
- Methylphenidate controlled release (Adhansia XR; Aptensio XR; Biphentin; Foquest; PRC-063) – norepinephrine–dopamine reuptake inhibitor (NDRI)
- PH-15 (PH15; PH15-NS) – chemoreceptor cell modulator (vomeropherine)
- VQW-765 (VQW765; AQW051; AQW-051; JQH481R778) – α_{7} nicotinic acetylcholine receptor partial agonist

=== Phase 1/2 ===
- Curcumin (CR-011L; Theracurmin) – undefined mechanism of action (immunomodulator)
- Edicotinib (JNJ-244; JNJ-40346527; JNJ-40346527-AAC-G-002; JNJ-527; PRV-6527) – colony-stimulating factor-1 receptor (CSF-1R) inhibitor

=== Phase 1 ===
- APH-1105 – α-secretase activator

=== Preclinical ===
- Borneol/cilostazol (cilostazol dexborneol; cilostazol/borneol; cilostazol/dexborneol; d-borneol/cilostazol; Y-6) – combination of borneol (various actions) and cilostazol (phosphodiesterase PDE3 inhibitor)
- DPX-101 – α_{5} subunit-containing GABA_{A} receptor positive allosteric modulator
- JN-0413 – synthetic α-klotho protein
- TET-104 – AAV-based gene therapy modulating E2F4

== Not under development ==
=== No development reported ===
- Amdiglurax (NSI-189; ALTO-100) – unknown mechanism of action (hippocampal neurogenesis stimulant and indirect brain-derived neurotrophic factor (BDNF) modulator)
- AP-5 – ionotropic glutamate NMDA receptor antagonist
- AVL-3288 (Anvylic-3288; UCI-4083) – α_{7} nicotinic acetylcholine receptor positive allosteric modulator
- BI-474121 – undefined mechanism of action
- BNC-375 – α_{7} nicotinic acetylcholine receptor positive allosteric modulator
- Eltoprazine (DU-28853) – serotonin 5-HT_{1A} and 5-HT_{1B} receptor agonist
- Emoxypine (ethylmethylhydroxypyridine; Mexidol) – various actions (antioxidant and other actions)
- GSK-1034702 (GSK1034702; GSK1043702) – muscarinic acetylcholine M_{1} receptor agonist
- HTL-9936 (HTL-0009936) – muscarinic acetylcholine M_{1} receptor agonist
- Idebenone (Avan; Cerestabon; CV-2619; Daruma; Mnesis) – antioxidant and free radical scavenger
- Irdabisant (CEP-26401) – histamine H_{3} receptor antagonist/inverse agonist
- KTX-0101 (sodium β-hydroxybutyrate) – free radical scavenger
- Laromestrocel (Allogeneic Human Mesenchymal Stem Cells; LMSC; Lomecel-B; LOMECEL-B; Longeveron human mesenchymal stem cells; Mesenchymal stem cell therapy) – bone-marrow-derived allogeneic mesenchymal stem-cell therapy
- Lenrispodun (IC-200214-12; IC-200214; IC200214 phosphate; ITI-214; ITI-002; ITI-12-Cyclo-(S,R) phosphate; ITI-214 phosphate; ITI12-phosphate; ITI200214-phosphate) – phosphodiesterase PDE1 inhibitor
- Masupirdine – serotonin 5-HT_{6} receptor antagonist
- MHP-133 – acetylcholinesterase inhibitor
- MW-151 (MW01-2-151SRM) – cytokine inhibitor
- Omberacetam (DVD-111; GVS-111; Noopept) – undefined mechanism of action (possible cycloprolylglycine/traneurocin prodrug)
- Osoresnontrine (BI-409306; SUB-166499) – phosphodiesterase PDE9A inhibitor
- PD-151832 – muscarinic acetylcholine M_{1} receptor agonist
- Plosaracetam (ABBV-552; SDI-118) – synaptic vesicle glycoprotein SV2A agonist
- Pregnenolone intranasal (MPP-26; PregnenoMat) – various actions
- Research programme: Alzheimer's disease therapeutics - ENKAM (FGL-S) – fibroblast growth factor (FGF) receptor modulator
- Research programme: glutamate receptor modulators - Eli Lilly and Company (LY-503430; LY-2607540; LY-450108) – ionotropic glutamate AMPA receptor agonists, ionotropic glutamate kainate receptor antagonists, and metabotropic glutamate mGlu_{2} receptor modulators
- Research programme: klotho protein modulators - Klogene Therapeutics – klotho modulators
- Research programme: phosphodiesterase IV inhibitors - Dart NeuroScience – phosphodiesterase PDE4 inhibitors
- Research programme: serotonin 6 receptor antagonists - GlaxoSmithKline (GSK-215083A; SB-357134; SB-699929) – serotonin 5-HT_{6} receptor antagonists
- Research programme: small molecule therapeutics - Algiax Pharmaceuticals (AP-19; AP-3; AP-4; AP-61; AP-778; AP-8; ThAc derivatives; thioacrylamide derivatives) – GABA_{A} receptor modulators and phosphodiesterase PDE4 modulators
- Research programme: targeted lipid transport therapeutics - Amarin (AMR-102/3; AMR-103; AMR-109; combinatorial lipids programme; TLT programme) – dopamine receptor agonists
- Research programme: therapeutic agents - AstraZeneca/Jubilant Biosys – undefined mechanism of action
- S-17092 – prolyl endopeptidase inhibitor
- Samelisant (SUVN-G3031) – histamine H_{3} receptor inverse agonist
- SCH-57790 – muscarinic acetylcholine M_{2} receptor antagonist
- Selegiline transdermal (Emsam; L-deprenyl) – monoamine oxidase B (MAO-B) inhibitor, catecholaminergic activity enhancer (CAE), and other actions
- Sirolimus (encapsulated rapamycin; eRapa) – mammalian target of rapamycin (mTOR) inhibitor
- SKL-15508 (SKL15508; SKL-A4R) – α_{7} nicotinic acetylcholine receptor agonist
- SNB-011 (Airnecflu; Pentarlandir; Pentarlandir UPPTA; SNB-01; SNB-011) – SARS-CoV-2 main protease inhibitor and transmembrane protease serine 2 (TMPRSS2) inhibitor

=== Suspended ===
- HTL-18318 (HTL-0018318; HTL18318) – muscarinic acetylcholine M_{1} receptor agonist

=== Discontinued ===
- ABT-239 – histamine H_{3} receptor antagonist
- Acamprosate/baclofen (PXT-864) – combination of acamprosate (various actions) and baclofen (GABA_{B} receptor agonist)
- ACP-319 – muscarinic acetylcholine M_{1} receptor positive allosteric modulator
- Adalimumab – monoclonal antibody against tumor necrosis factor alpha (TNF-α)
- Adrogolide (ABT-431; DAS-431) – dopamine D_{1} and D_{5} receptor agonist
- Alosetron (GR-68755; GR-68755C; Lotronex) – serotonin 5-HT_{3} receptor antagonist
- Anatabine – nicotinic acetylcholine receptor agonist and other actions
- AP-521 – serotonin 5-HT_{1A} receptor partial agonist
- ARR-17779 – α_{7} nicotinic acetylcholine receptor agonist
- AWD 52-39 (AWD-5239) – serotonin 5-HT_{2} receptor antagonist (LSD analogue)
- Bezisterim (17α-ethynyl-5-androstene-3β,7β,17β-triol; HE-3286; NE-3107; Triolex) – undefined mechanism of action (synthetic androstenetriol analogue and anti-inflammatory)
- Blarcamesine (AE-37; ANA001; ANAVEX 2-73) – sigma σ_{1} receptor agonist, muscarinic acetylcholine receptor modulator, and sodium and chloride channel modulator
- Bradanicline (ATA-101; TC-0569; TC-5619; TC-5619-238) – α_{7} nicotinic acetylcholine receptor agonist
- Cebaracetam (CGS-25248; ZY-15119) – undefined mechanism of action
- Certolizumab pegol (AutoClicks-Prefilled-Pen; CDP-870; Certolizumab; Cimzia; CIMZIA AutoClicks Prefilled Pen; Cimzia AutoClicks Prefilled Pen; CZP; PHA-738144; Simziya) – monoclonal antibody against tumor necrosis factor alpha (TNF-α)
- CI-933 – undefined mechanism of action
- Encenicline – α_{7} nicotinic acetylcholine receptor agonist
- Ethyl eicosapentaenoic acid (AMR-101; eicosapentaenoic acid ethyl ester; EPA-Vascepa; ethyl eicosapentaenoate; ethyl icopenate; ethyl-EPA; icosapent ethyl; icosapentaenoic acid ethyl ester; LAX-101; LAX-101c; Miraxion; Vascepa; Vazkepa) – omega-3 fatty acid
- Fasoracetam (AEVI-001; LAM-105; MDGN-001; NFC-1; NS-105) – various actions
- GSK-2981710 – undefined mechanism of action
- GTS-21 (DMXB-A) – α_{7} nicotinic acetylcholine receptor agonist
- Haloperidol ultra-low-dose (CLR-3001) – dopamine D_{2} and D_{3} receptor antagonist, sigma σ_{1} receptor antagonist, and other actions
- HOE-065 – undefined mechanism of action (acetylcholine release enhancer)
- Idalopirdine (DB-109; Lu AE58054; LU-AE58054; SGS-518) – serotonin 5-HT_{6} receptor antagonist
- Idazoxan (CGP-25811A; RX-781094) – α_{2}-adrenergic receptor antagonist
- IDRA-21 – ionotropic glutamate AMPA receptor positive allosteric modulator
- Ispronicline (AZD-3480; RJR-1734; TC-01734; TC-1734; TC-1734-112) – α_{4}β_{2} nicotinic acetylcholine receptor agonist
- Itasetron (DAU-6215; U-98079) – serotonin 5-HT_{3} receptor antagonist
- Landipirdine (RO-5025181; RO5025181-000; SYN-120) – serotonin 5-HT_{2A} and 5-HT_{6} receptor antagonist
- Levafetamine (C-105; L-amfetamine; L-amphetamine; levamfetamine; levoamphetamine) – norepinephrine–dopamine releasing agent (NDRA)
- LX-6171 – proline transporter (SLC6A7) inhibitor
- Mirisetron (SEC-579; WAY-100579; WAY-SEC-579) – serotonin 5-HT_{3} receptor antagonist
- Nerispirdine (HP-184) – acetylcholine release enhancer and K^{+}/Na^{+} use-dependent channel blocker
- NLX-101 (F15599; F-15599) – serotonin 5-HT_{1A} receptor agonist
- NSI-566 (NSI-566RSC) – human-spinal-cord-derived neural stem cell therapy
- NYX-458 – ionotropic glutamate NMDA receptor positive allosteric modulator
- Pesampator (BIIB-104; PF-04958242; PF-4958242) – ionotropic glutamate AMPA receptor positive allosteric modulator
- PF-6412562 (PF-06412562; PF-6412562; CVL-562; CVL562) – dopamine D_{1} and D_{5} receptor agonist
- Phenserine (DWJ301; DWJ-301) – acetylcholinesterase inhibitor and amyloid precursor protein (APP) downregulator
- Pozanicline (A-87089.0; ABT-089) – α_{4}β_{2} nicotinic acetylcholine receptor agonist
- Razpipadon (PF-06669571; PF-6669571; PF06669571; CVL-871; PW-0464) – dopamine D_{1} and D_{5} receptor agonist
- Research programme: histone deacetylase inhibitors - BioMarin (BMN-290) – histone deacetylase (HDAC) inhibitors and transcription factor stimulants
- Research programme: metabotropic glutamate receptor 5 modulators - Addex Therapeutics (ADX-47273; ADX-50938; ADX-63365; CDPPB) – metabotropic glutamate mGlu_{5} receptor modulators
- Research programme: mGluR2 modulators - Addex Pharmaceuticals/Ortho-McNeil (ADX-92639; JNJ-40068782) – metabotropic glutamate mGlu_{2} receptor modulators
- Rimonabant (Acomplia; SR-141716; SR-141716A; Zimulti) – cannabinoid CB_{1} receptor antagonist
- Rolofylline (KF-15372; KW-3902; MK-7418) – adenosine A_{1} receptor antagonist
- RS-67333 – serotonin 5-HT_{4} receptor agonist
- Sabcomeline (BCI-224; CEB 242; Memric; SB-202026) – muscarinic acetylcholine M_{1} receptor agonist
- SEP-227900 – D-amino acid oxidase inhibitor
- SIB-1553A – nicotinic acetylcholine receptor agonist
- SYN-114 (SYN114) – serotonin 5-HT_{6} receptor antagonist
- Terbequinil (SR-25776) – GABA_{A} receptor negative allosteric modulator
- Testosterone transdermal spray (Luramist; testosterone MDTS) – androgen (androgen receptor agonist)
- Thioperamide – histamine H_{3} receptor antagonist
- Tianeptine/naloxone (naloxone/tianeptine; TNX-601) – combination of tianeptine (atypical μ-opioid receptor agonist and other actions) and naloxone (orally inactive μ-opioid receptor antagonist)
- UBX-2089 – klotho modulator
- Zelatriazin (TAK-041; NBI-1065846; NBI-846) – GPR139 agonist
- Zervimesine (CT-1812; Elayta) – sigma σ_{2} receptor antagonist

== Clinically used drugs ==
=== Approved drugs ===
- Choline alfoscerate (choline alphoscerate; choline glycerophosphate; alpha-GPC; Brezal; Delecit; Gliatilin) – acetylcholine precursor
- EGb 761 (GBE-761; Gingogink; Ginkgo biloba Tanakan; Tebonin; Tebonin konzent; Tramisal) – various actions (antioxidant and other actions)
- Gingko mihuan (GMOL) – various actions (antioxidant and other actions)
- Memantine (Akatinol; Axura; D-145; Ebixa; Memary; Namenda; Namenda XR; SUN-Y7017; SUNY-017) – ionotropic glutamate NMDA receptor antagonist and other actions

== See also ==
- Lists of investigational drugs
- Nootropic
