= C10H14N2 =

The molecular formula C_{10}H_{14}N_{2} (molar mass: 162.23 g/mol, exact mass: 162.1157 u) may refer to:

- Anabasine
- Nicotine
- Phenylpiperazine
- Rivanicline
