= Choline m-bromophenyl ether =

Names
- Preferred IUPAC name 2-(3-Bromophenoxy)-N,N,N-trimethylethan-1-aminium
- Other names MBF

Identifiers
| CAS Number | 15823-66-2 |
| 3D model (JSmol) | Interactive image |
| ChemSpider | 364474 |
| PubChem CID | 411696 |
- InChI: InChI=1S/C11H17BrNO/c1-13(2,3)7-8-14-11-6-4-5-10(12)9-11/h4-6,9H,7-8H2,1-3H3/q+1 Key: OOVBETAQGQVMNH-UHFFFAOYSA-N
- SMILES: C[N+](C)(C)CCOc1cccc(c1)Br

Properties
| Chemical formula | C_{11}H_{17}BrNO |
| Molar mass | 259.167 g·mol^{−1} |
- Except where otherwise noted, data are given for materials in their standard state (at 25 °C [77 °F], 100 kPa). Infobox references

Choline m-bromophenyl ether (MBF) is an extremely potent nicotinic agonist. It has powerful ganglion stimulating effects. It also causes muscle contractions.
