= C20H28N4O2 =

The molecular formula C_{20}H_{28}N_{4}O_{2} may refer to:

- AB-CHMINACA, an indazole-based synthetic cannabinoid
- Rolofylline, an experimental diuretic which acts as a selective adenosine A1 receptor antagonist
