= C13H19NOS =

The molecular formula C_{13}H_{19}NOS (molar mass: 237.361 g/mol, exact mass: 237.1187 u) may refer to:

- α-Pyrrolidinopentiothiophenone
- SIB-1553A
