= Landipirdine =

Clinical data
- Other names: RO-5025181; RO5025181; SYN-120; SYN120
- Drug class: Serotonin 5-HT_{2A} receptor antagonist; Serotonin 5-HT_{6} receptor antagonist
- ATC code: None

Identifiers
- IUPAC name: [(1R)-6-(3-fluorophenyl)sulfonyl-1,2,3,4-tetrahydronaphthalen-1-yl]methylurea
- CAS Number: 1000308-25-7
- PubChem CID: 46220503
- DrugBank: DB16214
- UNII: J0NX985GDI
- KEGG: D11157
- ChEMBL: ChEMBL1082508

Chemical and physical data
- Formula: C_{18}H_{19}FN_{2}O_{3}S
- Molar mass: 362.42 g·mol^{−1}
- 3D model (JSmol): Interactive image
- SMILES: C1C[C@H](C2=C(C1)C=C(C=C2)S(=O)(=O)C3=CC=CC(=C3)F)CNC(=O)N
- InChI: InChI=1S/C18H19FN2O3S/c19-14-5-2-6-15(10-14)25(23,24)16-7-8-17-12(9-16)3-1-4-13(17)11-21-18(20)22/h2,5-10,13H,1,3-4,11H2,(H3,20,21,22)/t13-/m0/s1; Key:MTTHRRVVGMPYQG-ZDUSSCGKSA-N

Landipirdine (INN, USAN; developmental code names RO-5025181 and SYN-120) is a serotonin 5-HT_{2A} and 5-HT_{6} receptor antagonist which was under development for the treatment of dementia and cognition disorders but was never marketed. It is taken orally. The drug was developed by Roche, Accorda Therapeutics, and Biotie Therapies. It reached phase 2 clinical trials for dementia and phase 1 trials for cognition disorders prior to the discontinuation of its development in 2020. Landipirdine was first described in the scientific literature by at least 2010.

== See also ==
- List of investigational cognition and memory disorder drugs
