= Varenicline =

Nicotinic receptor agonist

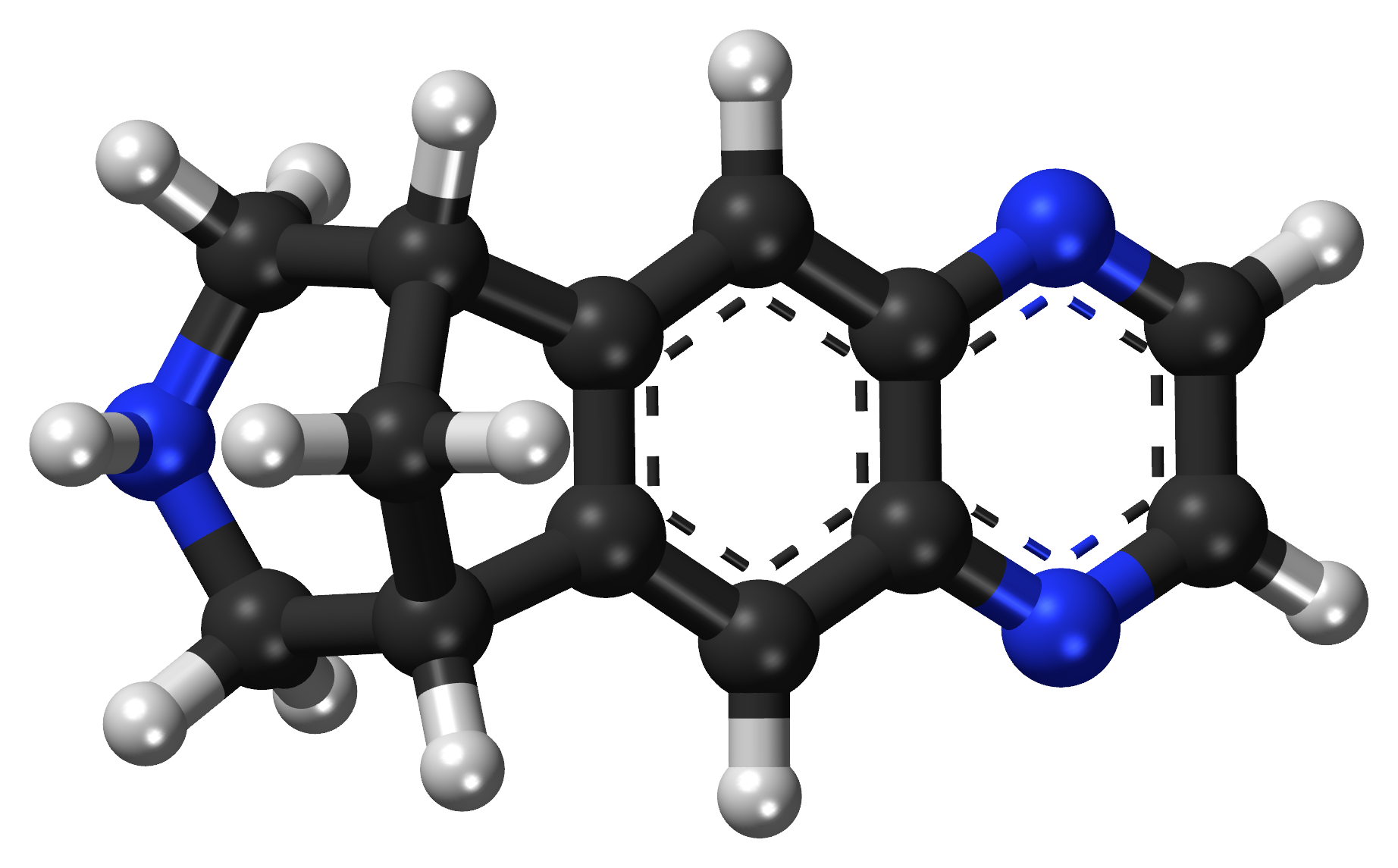

Clinical data
- Pronunciation: /vəˈrɛnɪkliːn/ və-REN-i-kleen
- Trade names: Champix, Chantix, Tyrvaya, others
- Other names: OC-01
- AHFS/Drugs.com: Monograph
- MedlinePlus: a606024
- License data: EU EMA: by INN; US DailyMed: Varenicline
- Pregnancy category: AU: B3
- Routes of administration: By mouth, intranasal
- Drug class: Nicotinic agonist
- ATC code: N07BA03 (WHO) S01XA28 (WHO)

Legal status
- Legal status: AU: S4 (Prescription only); CA: ℞-only; UK: POM (Prescription only); US: ℞-only; EU: Rx-only

Pharmacokinetic data
- Protein binding: <20%
- Metabolism: Primarily unchanged by OCT2. Insignificant CYP450 enzyme involved
- Metabolites: N-Formylvarenicline, Glucuronidated, Hexose Conjugated, Oxidated metabolites
- Elimination half-life: 24 hours
- Excretion: Kidney (81–92%)

Identifiers
- IUPAC name: 7,8,9,10-Tetrahydro-6,10-methano-6H-pyrazino[2,3-h] [3]benzazepine
- CAS Number: 249296-44-4; 375815-87-5
- PubChem CID: 5310966; 9906942
- IUPHAR/BPS: 5459
- DrugBank: DB01273; DBSALT000548
- ChemSpider: 4470510; 21230360
- UNII: W6HS99O8ZO; 82269ASB48
- KEGG: D08669; D06282
- ChEBI: CHEBI:84500; CHEBI:84507
- ChEMBL: ChEMBL1076903; ChEMBL1201135
- CompTox Dashboard (EPA): DTXSID40861516 DTXSID70891447, DTXSID40861516

Chemical and physical data
- Formula: C_{13}H_{13}N_{3}
- Molar mass: 211.268 g·mol^{−1}
- 3D model (JSmol): Interactive image
- SMILES: n1c2cc3c(cc2ncc1)[C@@H]4CNC[C@H]3C4
- InChI: InChI=1S/C13H13N3/c1-2-16-13-5-11-9-3-8(6-14-7-9)10(11)4-12(13)15-1/h1-2,4-5,8-9,14H,3,6-7H2/t8-,9+; Key:JQSHBVHOMNKWFT-DTORHVGOSA-N

Varenicline, sold under the brand names Chantix and Champix among others, is a medication used for smoking cessation and for the treatment of dry eye syndrome. It is a nicotinic acetylcholine receptor partial agonist. When activated, this receptor leads to the release of dopamine in the nucleus accumbens, the brain's reward center, thereby reducing cravings and withdrawal symptoms with smoking cessation, although less pronounced than a full agonist (e.g. nicotine).

Common side effects include nausea, insomnia, abnormal dreams, headache, and nasopharyngitis (inflammation of the nose and throat). Despite these potential adverse effects, varenicline has proven efficacy in helping individuals quit smoking. It is estimated that approximately one in eleven smokers who use varenicline successfully remain abstinent from tobacco at six months.

It is on the World Health Organization's List of Essential Medicines. The medication is available as a generic medication. In the United States, varenicline was prescribed over 1 million times in 2020, ranking as the 275th most commonly prescribed medication.

== Medical uses ==
Varenicline is indicated for use as an aid to smoking cessation treatment and for the treatment of the signs and symptoms of dry eye disease.

Varenicline is used to help people stop smoking tobacco (smoking cessation). A meta-analysis found that 20% of people treated with varenicline remain abstinent from smoking at one year. In a 2009 meta-analysis, varenicline was found to be more effective than bupropion (odds ratio 1.40) and nicotine replacement therapies (NRT) (odds ratio 1.56).

A 2013 Cochrane overview and network meta-analysis concluded that varenicline is the most effective medication for tobacco cessation and that smokers were nearly three times more likely to quit tobacco use while on varenicline than with placebo treatment. Varenicline was more efficacious than bupropion or NRT and as effective as combination NRT for cessation of tobacco smoking.

== Side effects ==
Mild nausea is the most common side effect and is seen in approximately 30% of people taking varenicline, though this rarely (<3%) results in discontinuation of the medication. Other less common side effects include headache, difficulty sleeping, and vivid dreams. Rare side effects reported by people taking varenicline compared to placebo include change in taste, vomiting, abdominal pain, flatulence, and constipation. It has been estimated that for every five subjects taking varenicline at maintenance doses, there will be one event of nausea; and for every 24 of 35 treated subjects, there will be an event of constipation or flatulence. Gastrointestinal side-effects lead to discontinuation of the drug in 2% to 8% of people using varenicline. Incidence of nausea is dose-dependent: incidence of nausea was higher in people taking a larger dose (30%) versus placebo (10%) as compared to people taking a smaller dose (16%) versus placebo (11%).

=== Depression and suicide ===
In 2007, the US Food and Drug Administration (FDA) announced it had received post-marketing reports of thoughts of suicide and occasional suicidal behavior, erratic behavior, and drowsiness among people using varenicline for smoking cessation. In 2009, the FDA required varenicline to carry a boxed warning that the medication should be stopped if any of these symptoms are experienced.

A 2014 systematic review (literature research) did not find evidence of an increased suicide risk. Other analyses have reached the same conclusion and found no increased risk of neuropsychiatric side effects with varenicline. No evidence for increased risks of cardiovascular events, depression, or self-harm with varenicline versus nicotine replacement therapy was found in one post-marketing surveillance study.

In 2016, the FDA removed the black box warning. People are still advised to stop the medication if they "notice any side effects on mood, behavior, or thinking."

=== Cardiovascular disease ===
In June 2011, the US FDA issued a safety announcement that varenicline may be associated with "a small, increased risk of certain cardiovascular adverse events in people who have cardiovascular disease".

A prior 2011 review had found increased risk of cardiovascular events compared with placebo. Expert commentary in the same journal raised doubts about the methodology of the review, concerns which were echoed by the European Medicines Agency and subsequent reviews. Of specific concern were "the low number of events seen, the types of events counted, the higher drop-out rate in people receiving placebo, the lack of information on the timing of events, and the exclusion of studies in which no-one had an event".

In contrast, multiple recent systematic reviews and meta-analyses have found no increase in overall or serious adverse cardiovascular events (including for individuals at risk of developing cardiovascular disease) associated with varenicline use.

== Pharmacology ==
=== Mechanism of action ===
Varenicline's Binding Affinity Table
Target	EC_{50} (μM)	IC_{50} (nM)	K_{i} (nM)	E_{max} (%)	Action
α_{4}β_{2}	1.30 ± 0.18	2.8 ± 1.2	0.09	20 ± 6	Partial Agonist
α_{4}β_{4}	0.37 ± 0.08	26.7 ± 2.4	0.121	93 ± 7	Full Agonist
α_{3}β_{4}	6.4 ± 1.2	2336 ± 762	13	45 ± 10	Partial Agonist
α_{7}	0.18 ± 0.02	69.0 ± 8.1	100	101 ± 8	Full/Super Agonist
α_{6}β_{2}	0.014	-	0.13 nM	49	Partial Agonist

Varenicline displays full agonism on α_{7} nicotinic acetylcholine receptors and is a partial agonist on the α_{4}β_{2}, α_{3}β_{4}, and α_{6}β_{2} subtypes.

Varenicline's partial agonism on the α_{4}β_{2} receptors rather than nicotine's full agonism produces less effect of dopamine release than nicotine's. This α_{4}β_{2} competitive binding reduces the ability of nicotine to bind and stimulate the mesolimbic dopamine system—similar to the method of action of buprenorphine in the treatment of opioid addiction. However, it is the α_{7}-pentamer that mediates clinical efficacy at remaining abstinent from nicotine.

=== Pharmacokinetics ===
Most of the active compound is excreted by the kidneys (92–93%) via the organic cation transporter OCT2 (SCL22A2) and may inhibit it at high concentrations. A small proportion is glucuronidated, oxidised, N-formylated or conjugated to a hexose.

== History ==
Use of Cytisus plants as a smoking substitute during World War II led to use as a cessation aid in eastern Europe and extraction of cytisine. Cytisine analogs led to varenicline at Pfizer.

Varenicline received a priority review by the US FDA in February 2006, shortening the usual ten-month review period to six months because of its demonstrated effectiveness in clinical trials and perceived lack of safety issues. The agency's approval of the drug came in May 2006. In September 2006, it was approved for sale in the European Union.

In September 2021, Pfizer announced a recall of "all lots of its anti-smoking treatment, Chantix [varenicline], due to high levels of cancer-causing agents called nitrosamines in the pills". This followed a July 2021 announcement by the FDA that it was "alerting patients and health care professionals to Pfizer's voluntary recall of nine lots of the smoking cessation drug" and further recalls by Pfizer on 19 July and 8 August. In June 2021, Pfizer paused distribution of Chantix worldwide; according to a media statement, "the distribution halt was out of an abundance of caution, pending further testing". According to the Pfizer Inc. 2020 Form 10-K Annual Report, high-revenue products by the company include[d] Chantix/Champix (varenicline) to treat nicotine addiction, which recorded direct product revenues of more than $1 billion in 2019, $919 million in 2020, and $398 million in 2021 (the lower 2021 revenue was due, in part, to the basic product patent expiration for Chantix in the US in November 2020 and in Europe in September 2021, and the aforementioned Pfizer voluntary recall across multiple markets and a global pause in shipments of Chantix.)

In October 2021, the US FDA approved Oyster Point Pharma to market Tyrvaya as a new route of varenicline administration through nasal spray for the treatment of dry eye disease.
