= Bezisterim =

Chemical compound

Clinical data
- Other names: NE3107; NE-3107; HE3286; HE-3286; Triolex; 17α-Ethynyl-5-androstene-3β,7β,17β-triol; 17α-Ethynylandrost-5-ene-3β,7β,17β-triol
- Routes of administration: Oral
- Drug class: Anti-inflammatory agent; Insulin sensitizer

Legal status
- Legal status: Investigational

Identifiers
- IUPAC name: (3S,7R,8R,9S,10R,13S,14S,17R)-17-ethynyl-10,13-dimethyl-1,2,3,4,7,8,9,11,12,14,15,16-dodecahydrocyclopenta[a]phenanthrene-3,7,17-triol
- CAS Number: 1001100-69-1
- PubChem CID: 16739648
- DrugBank: DB05212
- ChemSpider: 20571043
- UNII: PH8858757I
- KEGG: D12932
- ChEMBL: ChEMBL4297284
- CompTox Dashboard (EPA): DTXSID501267252

Chemical and physical data
- Formula: C_{21}H_{30}O_{3}
- Molar mass: 330.468 g·mol^{−1}
- 3D model (JSmol): Interactive image
- SMILES: C[C@]12CC[C@@H](CC1=C[C@@H]([C@@H]3[C@@H]2CC[C@]4([C@H]3CC[C@]4(C#C)O)C)O)O
- InChI: InChI=1S/C21H30O3/c1-4-21(24)10-7-16-18-15(6-9-20(16,21)3)19(2)8-5-14(22)11-13(19)12-17(18)23/h1,12,14-18,22-24H,5-11H2,2-3H3/t14-,15-,16-,17-,18+,19-,20-,21-/m0/s1; Key:JJKOQZHWYLMASZ-FJWDNACWSA-N

Bezisterim (INN, USAN; developmental code names NE3107, HE3286), also known as 17α-ethynylandrost-5-ene-3β,7β,17β-triol, is a synthetic analogue of dehydroepiandrosterone (DHEA) and its metabolite androstenetriol (AET) that is believed to have anti-inflammatory and insulin-sensitizing effects in the brain. The compound crosses the blood–brain barrier and does not activate any neurotransmitter receptors. It has been tested as a treatment for Alzheimer's disease, Parkinson's disease, traumatic brain injury, and post-acute COVID-19 syndrome (long COVID). The drug is under development for a variety of conditions and its highest developmental phase is phase 3 for Alzheimer's disease. Positive phase 2 findings for long COVID were released in October 2026.

== See also ==
- List of investigational cognition and memory disorder drugs
- List of investigational long COVID drugs
- List of investigational Parkinson's disease drugs
- Sipasterol
