= Plosaracetam =

Clinical data
- Other names: ABBV-552; ABBV552; SDI-118; SDI118
- Routes of administration: Oral
- Drug class: Synaptic vesicle glycoprotein 2A (SV2A) ligand

Identifiers
- IUPAC name: (4R)-1-[(5-chloro-1,2,4-triazol-1-yl)methyl]-4-(3,4,5-trifluorophenyl)pyrrolidin-2-one
- CAS Number: 1651179-19-9
- PubChem CID: 90467376
- ChemSpider: 129532952
- UNII: W3LYF2KQ6F
- KEGG: D13077
- ChEMBL: ChEMBL5314929

Chemical and physical data
- Formula: C_{13}H_{10}ClF_{3}N_{4}O
- Molar mass: 330.70 g·mol^{−1}
- 3D model (JSmol): Interactive image
- SMILES: C1[C@@H](CN(C1=O)CN2C(=NC=N2)Cl)C3=CC(=C(C(=C3)F)F)F
- InChI: InChI=1S/C13H10ClF3N4O/c14-13-18-5-19-21(13)6-20-4-8(3-11(20)22)7-1-9(15)12(17)10(16)2-7/h1-2,5,8H,3-4,6H2/t8-/m0/s1; Key:GPGBFZCJDZALPN-QMMMGPOBSA-N

Plosaracetam (INN; developmental code names ABBV-552, SDI-118) is a synaptic vesicle glycoprotein 2A (SV2A) ligand which is under development for the treatment of Alzheimer's disease and other cognition disorders. In contrast to earlier SV2A ligands like levetiracetam and brivaracetam, polsaracetam does not have anticonvulsant activity and instead shows pro-cognitive effects. The drug is being developed by UCB Biopharma and AbbVie. As of October 2024, it is in phase 2 clinical trials for Alzheimer's disease and phase 1 trials for cognition disorders.

== See also ==
- List of investigational cognition and memory disorder drugs
