= AZD0328 =

Chemical compound

Legal status
- Legal status: Investigational

Identifiers
- IUPAC name: 3′H-4-Azaspiro[bicyclo[2.2.2]octane-2,2'-furo[2,3-b]pyridine]
- CAS Number: 220099-91-2
- PubChem CID: 9794392
- ChemSpider: 7970159
- UNII: 2B218X5QIY
- ChEMBL: ChEMBL2151437
- CompTox Dashboard (EPA): DTXSID40944616

Chemical and physical data
- Formula: C_{13}H_{16}N_{2}O
- Molar mass: 216.284 g·mol^{−1}
- 3D model (JSmol): Interactive image
- SMILES: C1C2=CC=CN=C2OC11CN2CCC1CC2
- InChI: InChI=1S/C13H16N2O/c1-2-10-8-13(16-12(10)14-5-1)9-15-6-3-11(13)4-7-15/h1-2,5,11H,3-4,6-9H2/t13-/m0/s1; Key:OCKIPDMKGPYYJS-ZDUSSCGKSA-N

AZD0328 is an experimental drug. It is a selective α7 nicotinic receptor agonist that enhances cortical dopamine release and improves learning and attentional processes in rats.
