= PNU-120,596 =

Chemical compound

Identifiers
- IUPAC name: 1-(5-chloro-2,4-dimethoxyphenyl)-3-(5-methylisoxazol-3-yl)urea
- CAS Number: 501925-31-1
- PubChem CID: 311434
- IUPHAR/BPS: 3991
- ChemSpider: 275409
- UNII: 9EZT3PTH2J
- ChEMBL: ChEMBL257591
- CompTox Dashboard (EPA): DTXSID10964528

Chemical and physical data
- Formula: C_{13}H_{14}ClN_{3}O_{4}
- Molar mass: 311.72 g·mol^{−1}
- 3D model (JSmol): Interactive image
- SMILES: COc1cc(OC)c(Cl)cc1NC(=O)Nc2noc(C)c2
- InChI: InChI=1S/C13H14ClN3O4/c1-7-4-12(17-21-7)16-13(18)15-9-5-8(14)10(19-2)6-11(9)20-3/h4-6H,1-3H3,(H2,15,16,17,18); Key:CEIIEALEIHQDBX-UHFFFAOYSA-N

PNU-120596 is a drug that acts as a potent and selective positive allosteric modulator for the α7 subtype of neural nicotinic acetylcholine receptors. It is used in scientific research into cholinergic regulation of dopamine and glutamate release in the brain.
