= Zelatriazin =

Chemical compound

Clinical data
- Other names: NBI-1065846; TAK-041

Legal status
- Legal status: Investigational

Identifiers
- IUPAC name: 2-(4-Oxo-1,2,3-benzotriazin-3-yl)-N-[(1S)-1-[4-(trifluoromethoxy)phenyl]ethyl]acetamide
- CAS Number: 1929519-13-0
- PubChem CID: 121349608
- UNII: EXC8D658WN

Chemical and physical data
- Formula: C_{18}H_{15}F_{3}N_{4}O_{3}
- Molar mass: 392.338 g·mol^{−1}

Zelatriazin (NBI-1065846 or TAK-041) is a small-molecule agonist of GPR139. It was developed for schizophrenia and anhedonia in depression, but trials were unsuccessful and its development was discontinued in 2023.

== See also ==
- List of investigational antidepressants
- List of investigational antipsychotics
- List of investigational cognition and memory disorder drugs
