= AQW-051 =

Nicotinic agonist medication

Clinical data
- Other names: AQW051, VQW-765

Identifiers
- IUPAC name: (3R)-3-{[6-(4-methylphenyl)pyridin-3-yl]oxy}-1-azabicyclo[2.2.2]octane
- CAS Number: 669770-29-0
- PubChem CID: 50914822
- IUPHAR/BPS: 7371
- ChemSpider: 34980757
- UNII: JQH481R778
- ChEMBL: ChEMBL4532388

Chemical and physical data
- Formula: C_{19}H_{22}N_{2}O
- Molar mass: 294.398 g·mol^{−1}
- 3D model (JSmol): Interactive image
- SMILES: CC1=CC=C(C=C1)C2=NC=C(C=C2)O[C@H]3CN4CCC3CC4
- InChI: InChI=1S/C19H22N2O/c1-14-2-4-15(5-3-14)18-7-6-17(12-20-18)22-19-13-21-10-8-16(19)9-11-21/h2-7,12,16,19H,8-11,13H2,1H3/t19-/m0/s1; Key:NPDLTEZXGWRMLQ-IBGZPJMESA-N

AQW-051 also known as VQW-765 is an orally available, highly selective partial agonist of the alpha-7 nicotinic receptor (nAChR) developed by Novartis as a central nervous system agent aimed at improving cognitive function in disorders such as schizophrenia and Alzheimer's disease, and for reducing L-Dopa–induced dyskinesias in Parkinson's disease. AQW-051 had reached Phase 2 clinical trials for conditions like schizophrenia and Parkinson’s disease, but development for Alzheimer’s disease has been discontinued.

It was later licensed it to Vanda Pharmaceuticals and who are evaluating it in phase 3 clinical trials for phobic disorders and social anxiety.

== See also ==
- List of investigational cognition and memory disorder drugs
