= TC-O 9311 =

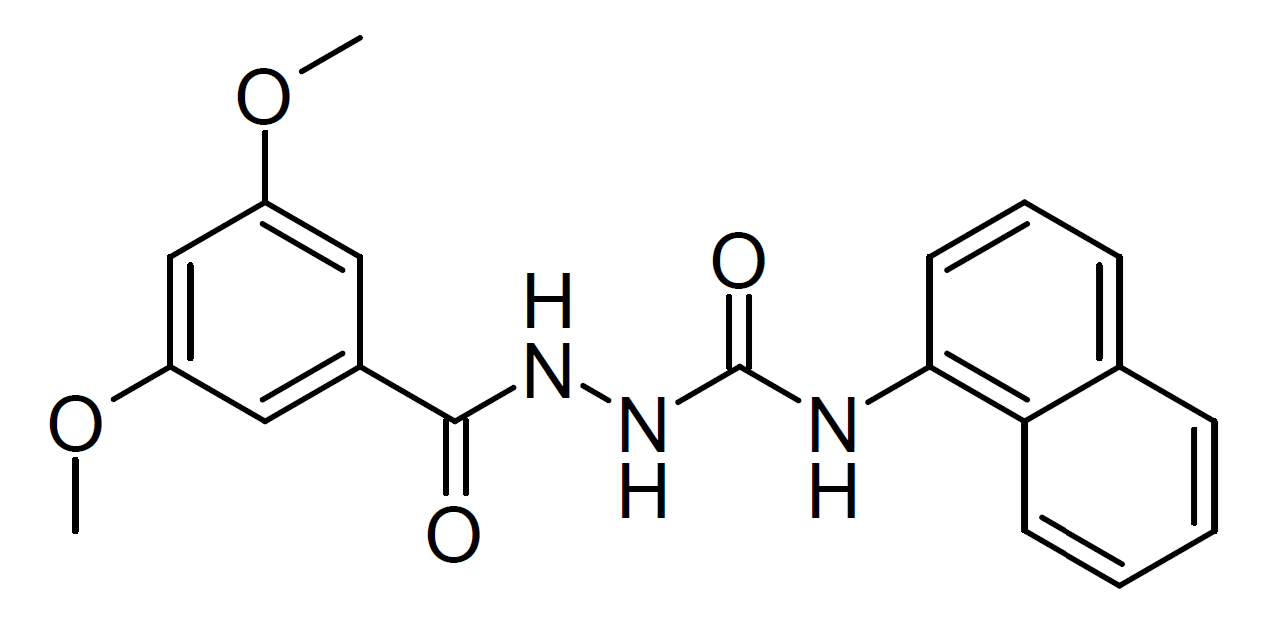

Identifiers
- IUPAC name: 1-[(3,5-dimethoxybenzoyl)amino]-3-naphthalen-1-ylurea
- CAS Number: 444932-31-4
- PubChem CID: 3376937
- ChemSpider: 2622265
- ChEMBL: ChEMBL3633893

Chemical and physical data
- Formula: C_{20}H_{19}N_{3}O_{4}
- Molar mass: 365.389 g·mol^{−1}
- 3D model (JSmol): Interactive image
- SMILES: COC1=CC(=CC(=C1)C(=O)NNC(=O)NC2=CC=CC3=CC=CC=C32)OC
- InChI: InChI=1S/C20H19N3O4/c1-26-15-10-14(11-16(12-15)27-2)19(24)22-23-20(25)21-18-9-5-7-13-6-3-4-8-17(13)18/h3-12H,1-2H3,(H,22,24)(H2,21,23,25); Key:KPTMSQHTGZMEFU-UHFFFAOYSA-N

TC-O 9311 is a chemical compound which acts as a small-molecule agonist of the previously orphan receptor GPR139. It has been used to investigate the structure and function of the GPR139 receptor, and its interactions with other receptors with which it is co-expressed in the body such as the dopamine D2 receptor and the melanocortin receptors.
