= Sipasterol =

Clinical data
- Other names: Androtriol; Triol; Annaosanchun; YC-6; YC6; 5α-Androstane-3β,5α,6β-triol; 5α-Androst-3β,5,6β-triol
- Routes of administration: Intravenous infusion
- Drug class: Anti-inflammatory steroid; Neuroprotective agent

Identifiers
- IUPAC name: (3S,5R,6R,8S,9S,10R,13S,14S)-10,13-dimethyl-1,2,3,4,6,7,8,9,11,12,14,15,16,17-tetradecahydrocyclopenta[a]phenanthrene-3,5,6-triol
- CAS Number: 4725-51-3
- PubChem CID: 53232379
- ChemSpider: 32077055

Chemical and physical data
- Formula: C_{19}H_{32}O_{3}
- Molar mass: 308.462 g·mol^{−1}
- 3D model (JSmol): Interactive image
- SMILES: C[C@@]12CCC[C@H]1[C@@H]3C[C@H]([C@]4(C[C@H](CC[C@@]4([C@H]3CC2)C)O)O)O
- InChI: InChI=1S/C19H32O3/c1-17-7-3-4-14(17)13-10-16(21)19(22)11-12(20)5-9-18(19,2)15(13)6-8-17/h12-16,20-22H,3-11H2,1-2H3/t12-,13-,14-,15-,16+,17-,18+,19-/m0/s1; Key:IFRIPYPBJCUNAG-OTMXHXQLSA-N

Sipasterol (INN; developmental code name YC-6), also known as androtriol, 5α-androstane-3β,5α,6β-triol, or annaosanchun, is an experimental anti-inflammatory steroid which is under development for the treatment of ischaemic stroke. It is given by intravenous infusion.

The drug has shown neuroprotective, anti-inflammatory, anti-excitotoxic, and anti-edema effects in preclinical research. The exact mechanism of action of sipasterol is undefined.

The chemical synthesis of sipasterol from dehydroepiandrosterone (DHEA) has been described. It is a synthetic analogue of the endogenous neuroprotective steroid and major cholesterol metabolite cholestane-3β,5α,6β-triol, which is known to produce neuroprotective effects by acting as a negative allosteric modulator of the NMDA receptor and inhibitor of acid-sensing ion channels and is known to inhibit neuronal hyperexcitability and produce anticonvulsant effects by negatively modulating voltage-gated sodium channels.

Sipasterol was first described in the scientific literature by 2013. It is under development by Guangzhou Cellprotek Pharmaceutical and Xiuhe Medical Technique. As of November 2024, no recent development has been reported. However, the findings of a phase 2 clinical trial were published in October 2025 and the drug's INN was designated in July 2026.

== See also ==
- List of neurosteroids
- Bezisterim
