= GPR139 =

Protein-coding gene in the species Homo sapiens

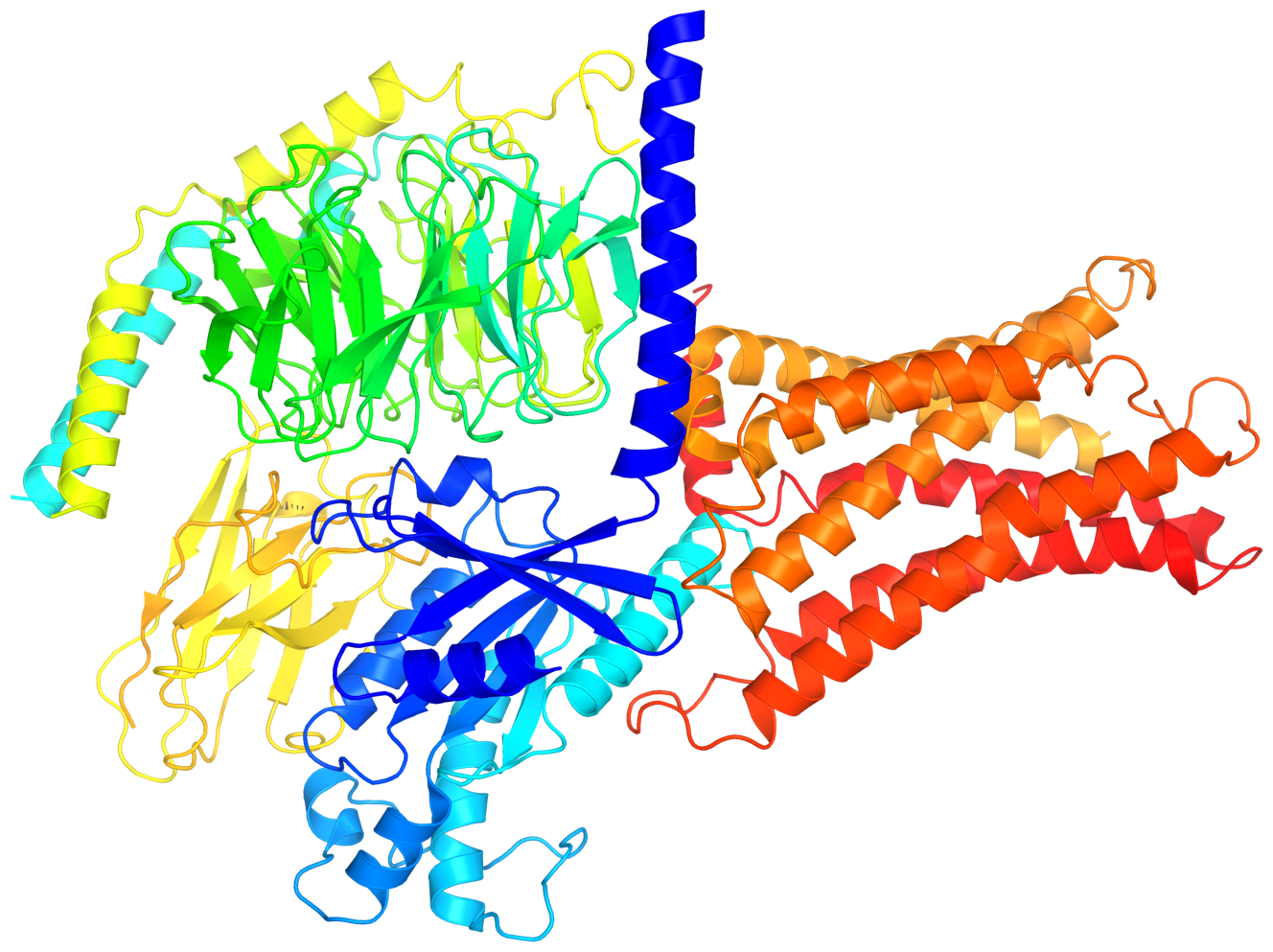

Identifiers
- Aliases: GPR139, GPRg1, PGR3, G protein-coupled receptor 139
- External IDs: OMIM: 618448; MGI: 2685341; GeneCards: GPR139

Gene location (Human)
Chr.	Chromosome 16 (human)
Band	16p12.3	Start	20,028,239 bp
Band	16p12.3	End	20,073,890 bp

Gene location (Mouse)
Chr.	Chromosome 7 (mouse)
Band	7|7 F2	Start	118,739,970 bp
Band	7|7 F2	End	118,783,826 bp
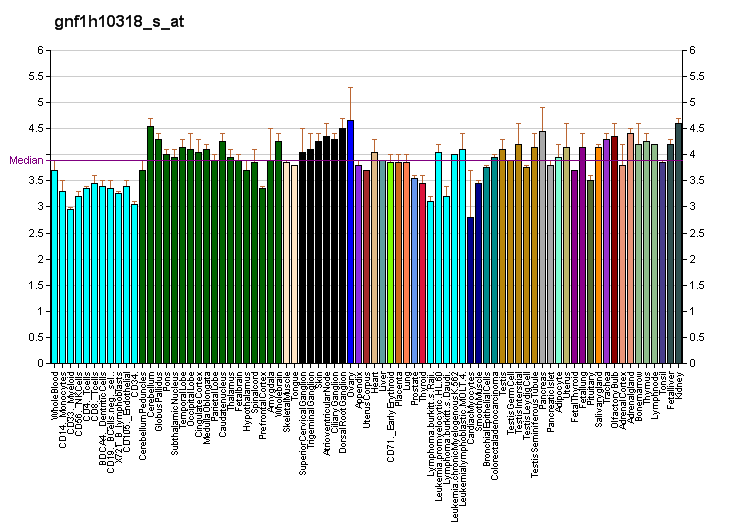

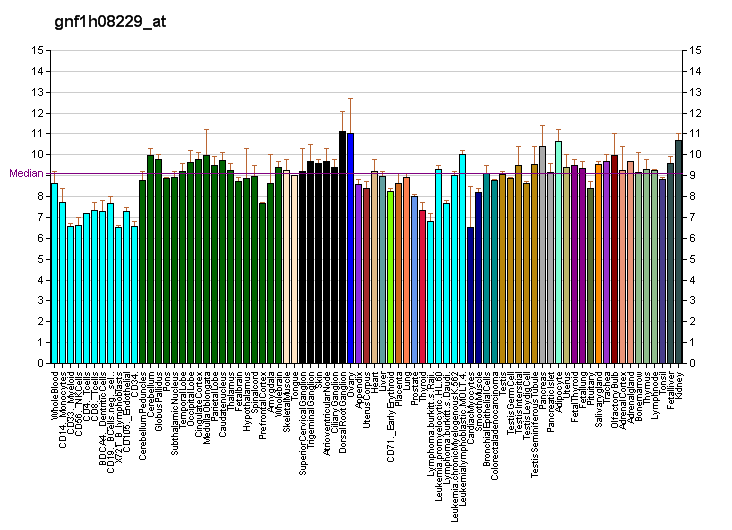
RNA expression pattern
Bgee	Human / Mouse (ortholog); Top expressed in: testicle; caudate nucleus; putamen; nucleus accumbens; hypothalamus; bone marrow; substantia nigra; pituitary gland; C1 segment; muscle tissue / Top expressed in: lumbar spinal ganglion; habenula; medial vestibular nucleus; deep cerebellar nuclei; mammillary body; dorsal tegmental nucleus; dorsomedial hypothalamic nucleus; lateral hypothalamus; central gray substance of midbrain; embryo; More reference expression data
BioGPS	More reference expression data
Gene ontology
Molecular function	G protein-coupled receptor activity; protein dimerization activity; signal transducer activity; neuropeptide receptor activity
Cellular component	integral component of membrane; plasma membrane; membrane
Biological process	G protein-coupled receptor signaling pathway; phospholipase C-activating G protein-coupled receptor signaling pathway; neuropeptide signaling pathway; signal transduction
Sources:Amigo / QuickGO
Orthologs
Databases	NCBI: entry; OMA: entry
Species	Human	Mouse
Entrez	124274	209776
Ensembl	ENSG00000180269	ENSMUSG00000066197
UniProt	Q6DWJ6	Q80UC8
RefSeq (mRNA)	NM_001002911; NM_001318483	NM_001024138
RefSeq (protein)	NP_001002911; NP_001305412	NP_001019309
Location (UCSC)	Chr 16: 20.03 – 20.07 Mb	Chr 7: 118.74 – 118.78 Mb
PubMed search
- Wikidata
View/Edit Human	View/Edit Mouse

G-protein coupled receptor 139 (GPR139) is a G protein-coupled receptor that in humans is encoded by the GPR139 gene. It is coupled to the G_{q/11} pathway, which is functionally opposite to the G_{i/o} inhibitory signaling of classical opioid receptors. It is evolutionarily ancient and highly conserved across vertebrate phylogenetic taxa, suggesting a fundamental role in neurophysiology. In humans, the receptor is exclusively expressed in the brain tissue, particularly in the medial habenula, septum, striatum, and hypothalamus.

Historically classified as an orphan receptor, activated only by L-tryptophan and L-phenylalanine in very high concentrations, GPR139 was deorphanized in 2025 as a novel, non-canonical opioid receptor specific to dynorphins, which selectively promote G protein activation of the receptor. It is proposed to function as a molecular homeostatic brake for excessive canonical opioid and D2 receptor signaling. Tryptamine is also a potent agonist of the GPR139 and has been reported to regulate sleep.

Research has shown that mice with loss of GPR139 experience schizophrenia-like symptomatology that is rescued with the dopamine receptor antagonist haloperidol and the μ-opioid receptor antagonist naltrexone.

== Interactions with μ-opioid receptor ==
GPR139 appears to counter μ-opioid receptors (MOR) through multiple mechanisms.

GPR139 constitutively promotes MOR desensitization. Expression of GPR139 at stoichiometric levels promoted β-arrestin recruitment to activated MORs. Appropriately, expression inhibited MOR — induced G protein activation. Overexpression of GPR139, but not stoichiometric expression, also decreased MOR at the cell surface.

GPR139 counteracts MOR signaling at secondary effectors. GPR139 expression inhibited GIRK channel activity through a Gq/11-dependent pathway. GPR139 activation increased cAMP production, also through a Gq/11-dependent pathway.

== Ligands ==
=== Agonists ===
- JNJ-63533054
- TC-O 9311 [444932-31-4]
- Tryptamine
- Zelatriazin (TAK-41), (NBI-1065846) a potent, and GPR139 receptor selective agonist which was in clinical trials to gauge the efficacy for treating psychiatric conditions such as major depressive disorder and the negative symptoms of schizophrenia, but was later dropped from development.

=== Antagonists ===
- JNJ-3792165
