= Zervimesine =

Clinical data
- Other names: CT-1812; CT1812
- Drug class: Sigma σ_{2} receptor antagonist

Identifiers
- IUPAC name: 4-[3-methyl-3-(5-methylsulfonyl-1,3-dihydroisoindol-2-yl)butyl]-2-[(2-methylpropan-2-yl)oxy]phenol
- CAS Number: 1802632-22-9
- PubChem CID: 118278088
- ChemSpider: 72379940
- UNII: 0661V34NTV
- KEGG: D13086
- ChEMBL: ChEMBL4846092

Chemical and physical data
- Formula: C_{24}H_{33}NO_{4}S
- Molar mass: 431.59 g·mol^{−1}
- 3D model (JSmol): Interactive image
- SMILES: CC(C)(C)OC1=C(C=CC(=C1)CCC(C)(C)N2CC3=C(C2)C=C(C=C3)S(=O)(=O)C)O
- InChI: InChI=1S/C24H33NO4S/c1-23(2,3)29-22-13-17(7-10-21(22)26)11-12-24(4,5)25-15-18-8-9-20(30(6,27)28)14-19(18)16-25/h7-10,13-14,26H,11-12,15-16H2,1-6H3; Key:ISQAPFMBJFZOLG-UHFFFAOYSA-N

Zervimesine (INN, USAN; developmental code name CT-1812 or CT1812) is a sigma σ_{2} receptor antagonist which is under development for the treatment of Alzheimer's disease, dementia, dry age-related macular degeneration, and other indications.

The drug shows high affinity for the sigma σ_{2} receptor (K_{i} = 8.5 nM). It also shows 7.4-fold lower affinity for the sigma σ_{1} receptor (K_{i} = 63 nM). Aside from the sigma σ_{1} receptor, the drug shows 100-fold selectivity for the sigma σ_{2} receptor over 72 other targets. The sigma σ_{2} receptor is a binding site for β-amyloid oligomers. Zervimesine has been found to diplace β-amyloid oligomers from the sigma σ_{2} receptor in both preclinical and clinical studies. As of 2024, effectiveness data on zervimesine for treatment of Alzheimer's disease are still lacking.

Zervimesine is under development by Cognition Therapeutics. As of July 2025, it is in phase 2 clinical trials for Alzheimer's disease, dementia with Lewy bodies (DLB), and dry age-related macular degeneration. The drug was also being developed for treatment of other cognitive disorders, but development for this indication was discontinued.

== See also ==
- List of investigational cognition and memory disorder drugs
- Blarcamesine
