= JNJ-3792165 =

Chemical compound

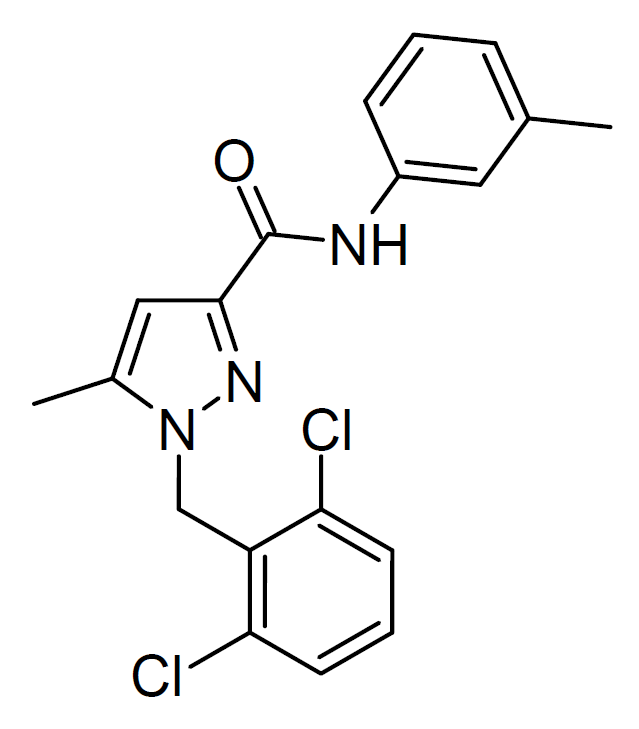

Identifiers
- IUPAC name: 1-[(2,6-dichlorophenyl)methyl]-5-methyl-N-(3-methylphenyl)pyrazole-3-carboxamide
- CAS Number: 353504-63-9
- PubChem CID: 2747070
- ChemSpider: 2028519

Chemical and physical data
- Formula: C_{19}H_{17}Cl_{2}N_{3}O
- Molar mass: 374.27 g·mol^{−1}
- 3D model (JSmol): Interactive image
- SMILES: CC1=CC(=CC=C1)NC(=O)C2=NN(C(=C2)C)CC3=C(C=CC=C3Cl)Cl
- InChI: InChI=1S/C19H17Cl2N3O/c1-12-5-3-6-14(9-12)22-19(25)18-10-13(2)24(23-18)11-15-16(20)7-4-8-17(15)21/h3-10H,11H2,1-2H3,(H,22,25); Key:SKUQQQWNGFTXFN-UHFFFAOYSA-N

JNJ-3792165 is a chemical compound which acts as a small-molecule antagonist of the previously orphan receptor GPR139. It has been shown to modulate dopamine release in the brain via interaction with the Dopamine receptor D2, and increases the effect of morphine at the mu opioid receptor.
