= JNJ-63533054 =

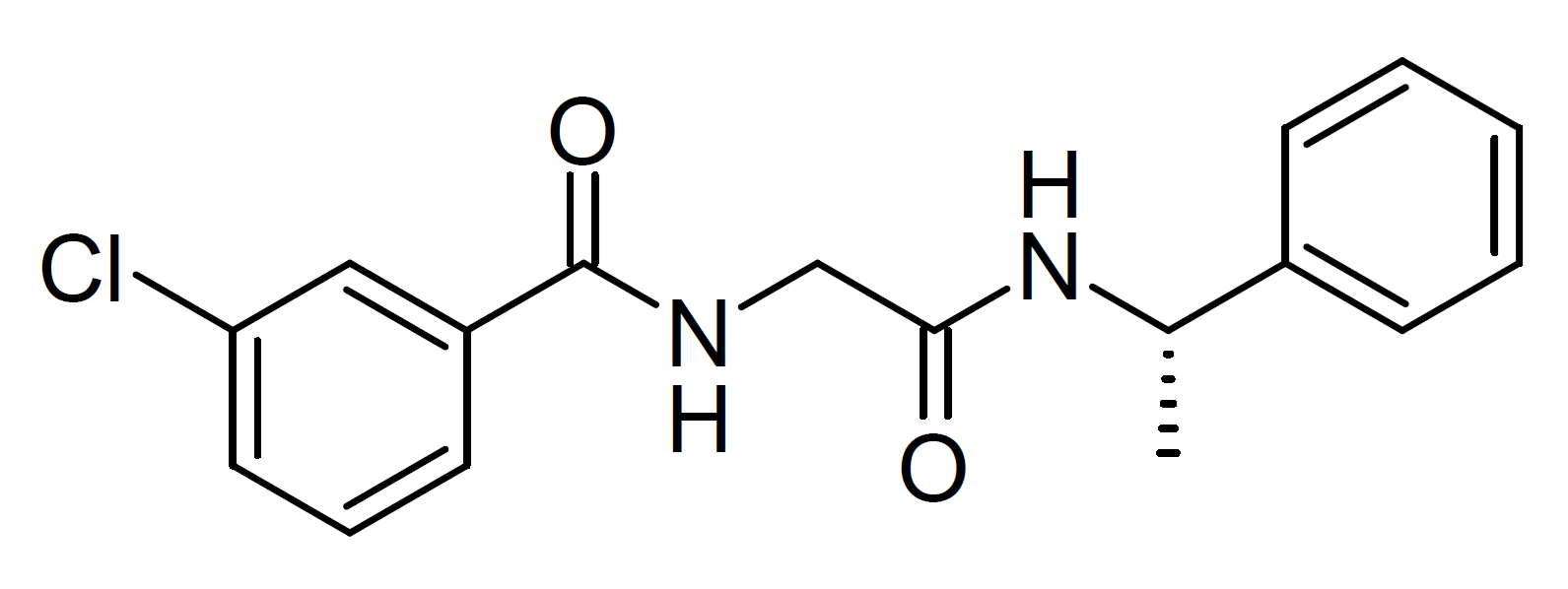

Identifiers
- IUPAC name: 3-chloro-N-[2-oxo-2-[[(1S)-1-phenylethyl]amino]ethyl]benzamide
- CAS Number: 1802326-66-4
- PubChem CID: 2548547
- IUPHAR/BPS: 8766
- ChemSpider: 1896806
- ChEMBL: ChEMBL3633720
- PDB ligand: 7ZQ (PDBe, RCSB PDB)

Chemical and physical data
- Formula: C_{17}H_{17}ClN_{2}O_{2}
- Molar mass: 316.79 g·mol^{−1}
- 3D model (JSmol): Interactive image
- SMILES: C[C@@H](C1=CC=CC=C1)NC(=O)CNC(=O)C2=CC(=CC=C2)Cl
- InChI: InChI=1S/C17H17ClN2O2/c1-12(13-6-3-2-4-7-13)20-16(21)11-19-17(22)14-8-5-9-15(18)10-14/h2-10,12H,11H2,1H3,(H,19,22)(H,20,21)/t12-/m0/s1; Key:MWDVCHRYCKXEBY-LBPRGKRZSA-N

JNJ-63533054 is a chemical compound which acts as a small-molecule agonist of the previously orphan receptor GPR139. It has been used to investigate the role of GPR139 in various behavioral processes including sleep, anxiety, addiction, and cognition.
