= RIC3 =

Protein-coding gene in the species Homo sapiens

Identifiers
- Aliases: RIC3, AYST720, PRO1385, RIC3 acetylcholine receptor chaperone, RIC-3
- External IDs: OMIM: 610509; MGI: 2443887; HomoloGene: 49772; GeneCards: RIC3; OMA:RIC3 - orthologs

Gene location (Human)
Chr.	Chromosome 11 (human)
Band	11p15.4	Start	8,106,056 bp
Band	11p15.4	End	8,169,055 bp

Gene location (Mouse)
Chr.	Chromosome 7 (mouse)
Band	7|7 E3	Start	108,633,519 bp
Band	7|7 E3	End	108,682,538 bp
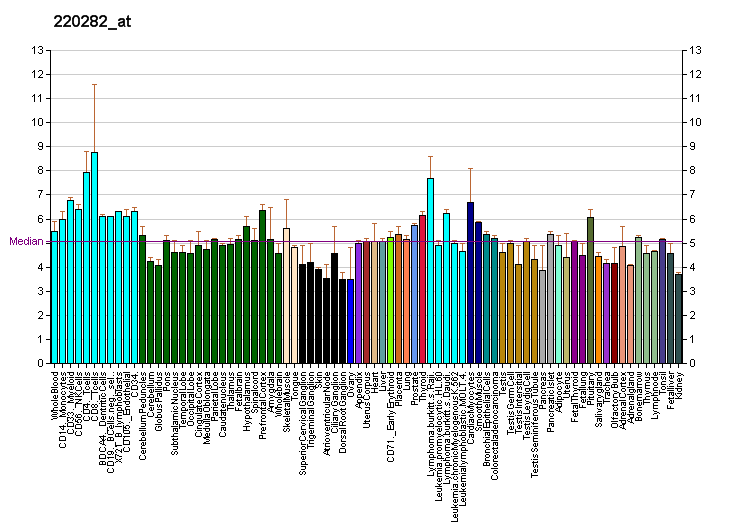
RNA expression pattern
Bgee	Human / Mouse (ortholog); Top expressed in: anterior pituitary; left lobe of thyroid gland; right lobe of thyroid gland; right hemisphere of cerebellum; body of pancreas; right uterine tube; left ovary; gastric mucosa; skin of abdomen; minor salivary glands / Top expressed in: Rostral migratory stream; dentate gyrus of hippocampal formation granule cell; neural layer of retina; visual cortex; primary visual cortex; lumbar subsegment of spinal cord; superior frontal gyrus; spermatocyte; cerebellar cortex; tail of embryo; More reference expression data
BioGPS	More reference expression data
Gene ontology
Molecular function	protein folding chaperone activity; acetylcholine receptor binding
Cellular component	integral component of membrane; neuron projection; Golgi membrane; soma; Golgi apparatus; endoplasmic reticulum membrane; intracellular membrane-bounded organelle; endoplasmic reticulum; membrane
Biological process	positive regulation of cytosolic calcium ion concentration; synaptic transmission, cholinergic; protein localization to cell surface; protein folding
Sources:Amigo / QuickGO
Orthologs
Species	Human	Mouse
Entrez	79608	320360
Ensembl	ENSG00000166405	ENSMUSG00000048330
UniProt	Q7Z5B4	Q8BPM6
RefSeq (mRNA)	NM_001135109; NM_001206671; NM_001206672; NM_024557; NM_001346690 NM_001346691; NM_001346692; NM_001346693; NM_001346694	NM_001038624; NM_178780; NM_001311161
RefSeq (protein)	NP_001128581; NP_001193600; NP_001193601; NP_001333619; NP_001333620 NP_001333621; NP_001333622; NP_001333623; NP_078833	NP_001033713; NP_001298090; NP_848895
Location (UCSC)	Chr 11: 8.11 – 8.17 Mb	Chr 7: 108.63 – 108.68 Mb
PubMed search
- Wikidata
View/Edit Human	View/Edit Mouse

RIC-3 also known as resistance to inhibitors of cholinesterase 3 is a chaperone protein that in humans is encoded by the RIC3 gene. The RIC3 gene was first discovered in C. elegans. RIC-3 protein is conserved in most animals and influences the maturation of various ligand gated ion channels including the serotonin 5-HT_{3} receptor and nicotinic acetylcholine receptors, particularly the homomeric α_{7} nicotinic receptor. RIC-3 enhances currents generated by these receptors by expediting receptor transport to the cell surface and by increasing receptor number.
