= PNU-282,987 =

Chemical compound

Identifiers
- IUPAC name: N-[(3'R)-1'-azabicyclo[2.2.2]oct-3'-yl]-4-chlorobenzamide
- CAS Number: 123464-89-1
- PubChem CID: 9795278
- ChemSpider: 7971045
- UNII: 810P1694K2
- ChEMBL: ChEMBL177611
- CompTox Dashboard (EPA): DTXSID801017103

Chemical and physical data
- Formula: C_{14}H_{17}ClN_{2}O
- Molar mass: 264.75 g·mol^{−1}
- 3D model (JSmol): Interactive image
- SMILES: C1CN2CCC1[C@H](C2)NC(=O)C3=CC=C(C=C3)Cl
- InChI: InChI=1S/C14H17ClN2O/c15-12-3-1-11(2-4-12)14(18)16-13-9-17-7-5-10(13)6-8-17/h1-4,10,13H,5-9H2,(H,16,18)/t13-/m0/s1; Key:WECKJONDRAUFDD-ZDUSSCGKSA-N

PNU-282,987 is a drug that acts as a potent and selective agonist for the α7 subtype of neural nicotinic acetylcholine receptors. In animal studies, it shows nootropic effects, and derivatives may be useful in the treatment of schizophrenia, although PNU-282,987 is not suitable for use in humans because of excessive inhibition of the hERG antitarget. PNU-282987 has been shown to initiate signaling that leads to adult neurogeneis in mammals.
