= SSR-180,711 =

Chemical compound

Identifiers
- IUPAC name: (4-bromophenyl) 1,4-diazabicyclo[3.2.2]nonane-4-carboxylate
- CAS Number: 298198-52-4
- PubChem CID: 9928899
- ChemSpider: 7973126
- UNII: QF4P1U1666

Chemical and physical data
- Formula: C_{14}H_{21}BrN_{2}O_{2}
- Molar mass: 329.238 g·mol^{−1}
- 3D model (JSmol): Interactive image
- SMILES: c1cc(ccc1OC(=O)N2CCN3CCC2CC3)Br
- InChI: InChI=1S/C14H17BrN2O2/c15-11-1-3-13(4-2-11)19-14(18)17-10-9-16-7-5-12(17)6-8-16/h1-4,12H,5-10H2; Key:RXLOZRCLQMJJLC-UHFFFAOYSA-N

SSR180711 is a drug that acts as a potent and selective partial agonist for the α7 subtype of neural nicotinic acetylcholine receptors. In animal studies, it shows nootropic effects and may be useful in the treatment of schizophrenia.
