= Rivanicline =

Chemical compound

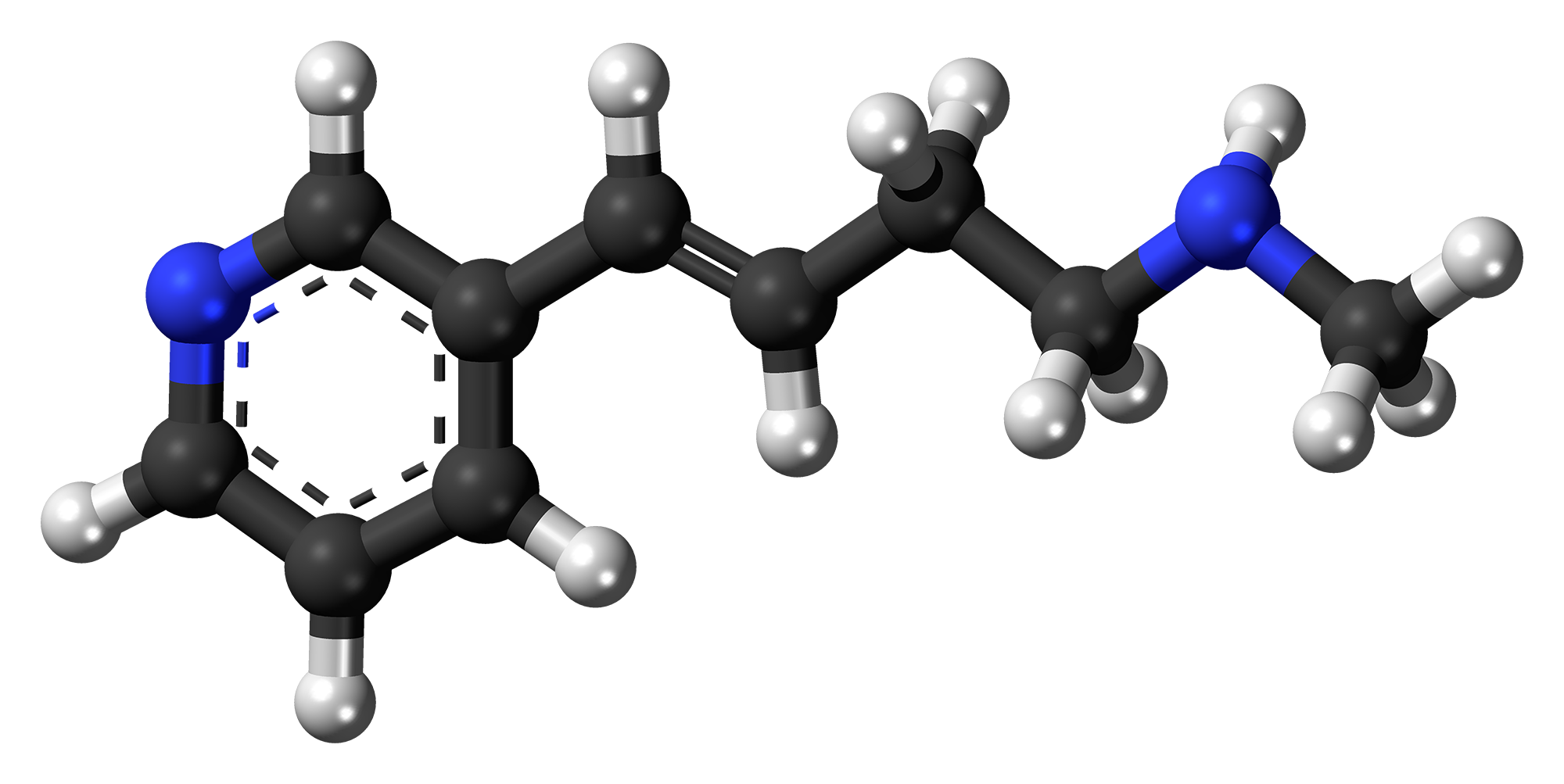

Clinical data
- ATC code: none

Identifiers
- IUPAC name: (E)-N-Methyl-4-(3-pyridinyl)-3-butene-1-amine
- CAS Number: 15585-43-0 538-79-4 (Mixture E of Z)
- PubChem CID: 5310967
- IUPHAR/BPS: 3994
- ChemSpider: 4470511
- UNII: 6H35LF645A
- CompTox Dashboard (EPA): DTXSID101017740

Chemical and physical data
- Formula: C_{10}H_{14}N_{2}
- Molar mass: 162.236 g·mol^{−1}
- 3D model (JSmol): Interactive image
- SMILES: CNCC\C=C\C1=CN=CC=C1
- InChI: InChI=1S/C10H14N2/c1-11-7-3-2-5-10-6-4-8-12-9-10/h2,4-6,8-9,11H,3,7H2,1H3/b5-2+; Key:JUOSGGQXEBBCJB-GORDUTHDSA-N

Rivanicline (TC-2403, RJR-2403, (E)-metanicotine) is a drug which acts as a partial agonist at neural nicotinic acetylcholine receptors. It is subtype-selective, binding primarily to the α4β2 subtype. It has nootropic effects and was originally developed as a potential treatment for Alzheimer's disease, but a second action that was subsequently found was that it inhibits the production of Interleukin-8 and thus produces an antiinflammatory effect, and so it has also been developed as a potential treatment for ulcerative colitis. Rivanicline also has stimulant and analgesic actions which are thought to be mediated through stimulation of noradrenaline release, and so it could also have other applications. It has been identified as constituent of tobacco as well.

== See also ==
- Ispronicline
