= Ispronicline =

Chemical compound

Clinical data
- ATC code: none

Identifiers
- IUPAC name: (2S,4E)-5-(5-isopropoxypyridin-3-yl)-N-methylpent-4-en-2-amine
- CAS Number: 252870-53-4
- PubChem CID: 9824145
- ChemSpider: 7999892
- UNII: 3E05NBH9V5
- KEGG: D08935
- CompTox Dashboard (EPA): DTXSID001027512

Chemical and physical data
- Formula: C_{14}H_{22}N_{2}O
- Molar mass: 234.343 g·mol^{−1}
- 3D model (JSmol): Interactive image
- SMILES: C[C@@H](C/C=C/C1=CC(=CN=C1)OC(C)C)NC
- InChI: InChI=1S/C14H22N2O/c1-11(2)17-14-8-13(9-16-10-14)7-5-6-12(3)15-4/h5,7-12,15H,6H2,1-4H3/b7-5+/t12-/m0/s1; Key:RPCVIAXDAUMJJP-PZBABLGHSA-N

Ispronicline (TC-1734, AZD-3480) is an experimental drug which acts as a partial agonist at neural nicotinic acetylcholine receptors. It progressed to phase II clinical trials for the treatment of dementia and Alzheimer's disease, but is no longer under development.

It has also progressed to phase II as a potential treatment for ADHD. With dosages of 50 mg/day showing a significant improvement in ADHD symptoms

Ispronicline is subtype-selective, binding primarily to the α4β2 subtype. It has antidepressant, nootropic and neuroprotective effects.

Early stage clinical trials showed that ispronicline was well tolerated, with the main side effects being dizziness and headache. However, mid-stage clinical trials failed to show sufficient efficacy to continue development as a pharmaceutical drug.

== See also ==
- List of investigational cognition and memory disorder drugs
- Rivanicline
