= Androstenetriol =

Chemical compound

Clinical data
- Other names: AET; Androst-5-ene-3β,7β,17β-triol; β-Androstenetriol; β-AET

Identifiers
- IUPAC name: (3S,7R,8R,9S,10R,13S,14S,17S)-10,13-Dimethyl-2,3,4,7,8,9,11,12,14,15,16,17-dodecahydro-1H-cyclopenta[a]phenanthrene-3,7,17-triol
- CAS Number: 2697-85-0
- PubChem CID: 9818024
- DrugBank: DB06257
- ChemSpider: 7993774
- UNII: Q0CZ537GC8
- CompTox Dashboard (EPA): DTXSID201043225

Chemical and physical data
- Formula: C_{19}H_{30}O_{3}
- Molar mass: 306.446 g·mol^{−1}
- 3D model (JSmol): Interactive image
- SMILES: C[C@]12CC[C@H]3[C@H]([C@@H]1CC[C@@H]2O)[C@H](C=C4[C@@]3(CC[C@@H](C4)O)C)O
- InChI: InChI=1S/C19H30O3/c1-18-7-5-12(20)9-11(18)10-15(21)17-13-3-4-16(22)19(13,2)8-6-14(17)18/h10,12-17,20-22H,3-9H2,1-2H3/t12-,13-,14-,15-,16-,17-,18-,19-/m0/s1; Key:OEVZKEVBDIDVOI-YSZCXEEOSA-N

Androstenetriol (AET, androst-5-ene-3β,7β,17β-triol, β-androstenetriol, or β-AET) is a steroid produced in the adrenal glands as a metabolite of dehydroepiandrosterone (DHEA). It is believed to have similar effects as DHEA and androstenediol. A study in rodents found that the compound was a weak androgen and estrogen, but did not bind to the androgen, estrogen, progesterone, or glucocorticoid receptors. Synthetic analogues of androstenetriol such as bezisterim (HE3286, NE3107; the 17α-ethynylated derivative) have been developed and are under study.
