= Rolofylline =

Chemical compound

Clinical data
- ATC code: C03BD (WHO)

Legal status
- Legal status: US: ℞-only

Identifiers
- IUPAC name: 8-(Hexahydro-2,5-methanopentalen-3a(1H)-yl)-3,7-dihydro-1,3-dipropyl-1H-purine-2,6-dione
- CAS Number: 136199-02-5
- PubChem CID: 64627
- IUPHAR/BPS: 5604
- DrugBank: DB12670
- ChemSpider: 58188
- UNII: 7805S5HIHX
- KEGG: D08989
- ChEBI: CHEBI:177647
- ChEMBL: ChEMBL52333
- CompTox Dashboard (EPA): DTXSID50929292
- ECHA InfoCard: 100.190.068

Chemical and physical data
- Formula: C_{20}H_{28}N_{4}O_{2}
- Molar mass: 356.470 g·mol^{−1}
- 3D model (JSmol): Interactive image
- SMILES: CCCn1c(=O)c2[nH]c(C34CC5CC(CC(C5)C3)C4)nc2n(CCC)c1=O
- InChI: InChI=1S/C20H28N4O2/c1-3-5-23-16-15(17(25)24(6-4-2)19(23)26)21-18(22-16)20-10-12-7-13(11-20)9-14(20)8-12/h12-14H,3-11H2,1-2H3,(H,21,22); Key:PJBFVWGQFLYWCB-UHFFFAOYSA-N

Rolofylline (KW-3902) is an experimental diuretic which acts as a selective adenosine A1 receptor antagonist. It was discovered at NovaCardia, Inc. which was purchased by Merck & Co., Inc. in 2007.

Development of rolofylline was terminated on September 1, 2009, after the results of a large clinical trial (PROTECT) showed the drug to be no better than placebo for patients with acute heart failure. Participants given rolofylline did show some improvement in shortness of breath, but the drug did not prevent kidney damage or have any significant effect on overall treatment success. Rolofylline was also associated with a higher incidence of seizures and stroke.

== See also ==
- List of investigational cognition and memory disorder drugs
