= Alpha-7 nicotinic receptor =

Type of cell receptor found in humans

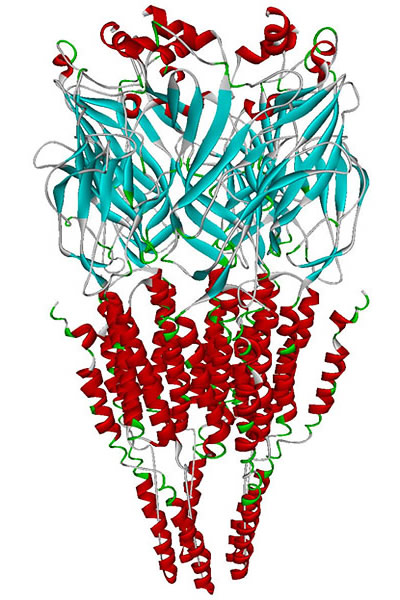
Molecular model of the α_{7} nicotinic receptor

The alpha-7 nicotinic receptor, also known as the α7 receptor, is a type of nicotinic acetylcholine receptor implicated in long-term memory, consisting entirely of α7 subunits. As with other nicotinic acetylcholine receptors, functional α7 receptors are pentameric [i.e., (α7)_{5} stoichiometry].

It is located in the brain, spleen, and lymphocytes of lymph nodes where activation yields post- and presynaptic excitation, mainly by increased Ca^{2+} permeability.

Further, recent work has implicated this receptor as being important for generation of adult mammal neurons in the retina. Functional α7 receptors are present in the submucous plexus neurons of the guinea-pig ileum.

== Research ==
The recent work has demonstrated a potential role in reducing inflammatory neurotoxicity in stroke, myocardial infarction, sepsis, and Alzheimer's disease.

The α7 receptor has been implicated in the efficacy of Varenicline for smoking cessation therapy significantly more than α4β2 which is responsible for nicotine's rewarding effects. Upregulation of α7-nAChR's is greatly correlated with a stronger response.

An α7 nicotinic agonist was found to have positive effects on neurocognition in persons with schizophrenia in a small proof-of-concept trial.

Activation of α7 nicotinic acetylcholine receptor on mast cells, is a mechanism by which nicotine enhances atherosclerosis in apolipoprotein E deficient mice.

Both α4β2 and α7 nicotinic receptors appear to be critical for memory, working memory, learning, and attention.

α7-nicotinic receptors also appear to be involved in cancer progression. They have been shown to mediate cancer cell proliferation and metastasis. α7 receptors are also involved in angiogenic and neurogenic activity, and have anti-apoptotic effects.

== Ligands ==
=== Agonists ===
- (+)-N-(1-azabicyclo[2.2.2]oct-3-yl)benzo[b]furan- 2-carboxamide: potent and highly subtype-selective
- A-582941: partial agonist; activates ERK1/2 and CREB phosphorylation; enhances cognitive performance
- ABT-107
- AQW-051
- AR-R17779: full agonist, nootropic
- Amyloid beta: neurotoxic marker of Alzheimer's disease
- TC-1698: subtype-selective; neuroprotective effects via activation of the JAK2/PI-3K cascade, neutralized by angiotensin II AT(2) receptor activation
- Bradanicline — partial agonist, in development for treatment of schizophrenia
- Encenicline — partial agonist with nootropic properties, in development for treatment of schizophrenia and Alzheimer's disease
- GTS-21 — partial agonist, in development for treatment of schizophrenia and/or Alzheimer's disease
- PHA-543,613 — selective and potent agonist with nootropic properties
- PNU-282,987 — selective and potent agonist, but may cause long QT syndrome
- PHA-709829: potent and subtype-selective; robust in vivo efficacy in a rat auditory sensory gating model
  - Analogues: improved hERG safety profile over PNU-282,987
- SSR-180,711: partial agonist
- Tilorone
- Tropisetron: subtype-selective partial agonist; 5-HT_{3} receptor antagonist
- WAY-317,538 — selective potent full agonist with nootropic and neuroprotective properties
- Anabasine
- Acetylcholine
- Nicotine
- Varenicline
- Epiboxidine
- Choline
- ICH-3: subtype-selective partial agonist

=== Positive allosteric modulators (PAMs) ===
At least two types of positive allosteric modulators (PAMs) can be distinguished.

- PNU-120,596
- NS-1738: marginal effects on α_{7} desensitization kinetics; modestly brain-penetrant
- AVL-3288: unlike the above PAMs, AVL-3288 does not affect α_{7} desensitization kinetics, and is readily brain penetrant. Improves cognitive behavior in animal models In clinical development for cognitive deficits in schizophrenia.
- A-867744
- Ivermectin

=== Other ===
- Nefiracetam
- Aspirin

=== Antagonists ===
It is found that anandamide and ethanol cause an additive inhibition on the function of α_{7}-receptor by interacting with distinct regions of the receptor. Although ethanol inhibition of the α_{7}-receptor is likely to involve the N-terminal region of the receptor, the site of action for anandamide is located in the transmembrane and carboxyl-terminal domains of the receptors.

- Anandamide
- α-Bungarotoxin
- α-Conotoxin ArIB[V11L,V16D]: potent and highly subtype-selective; slowly reversible
- β-Caryophyllene
- Bupropion (very weakly)
- Dehydronorketamine
- Dextroamphetamine (very weakly)
- Ethanol
- Hydroxybupropion (very weakly)
- Kynurenic acid
- Levoamphetamine (very weakly)
- Memantine
- Lobeline
- Methyllycaconitine
- Norketamine
- Quinolizidine (−)-1-epi-207I: α_{7} subtype preferring blocker

=== Negative allosteric modulators (NAMs) ===
- Hydroxynorketamine

== See also ==
- α3β2-Nicotinic receptor
- α3β4-Nicotinic receptor
- α4β2-Nicotinic receptor
- RIC3, a chaperone protein for α7 receptors
- Endocannabinoids
