= Famiraprinium =

Selective GABAA receptor antagonist

Names
- IUPAC name 4-(6-Imino-5-methyl-3-phenylpyridazin-1-yl)butanoic acid
- Other names SR-95103

Identifiers
CAS Number	105538-42-9; HCl: 96440-63-0
3D model (JSmol)	Interactive image; HCl: Interactive image
ChEMBL	ChEMBL132561; HCl: ChEMBL1202348
ChemSpider	23210134; HCl: 181041
PubChem CID	125959; HCl: 125958
UNII	5T4S95N342
- InChI: InChI=1S/C15H17N3O2/c1-11-10-13(12-6-3-2-4-7-12)17-18(15(11)16)9-5-8-14(19)20/h2-4,6-7,10,16H,5,8-9H2,1H3,(H,19,20) Key: LLZVAIDABZBAGE-UHFFFAOYSA-N; HCl: InChI=1S/C15H17N3O2.ClH/c1-11-10-13(12-6-3-2-4-7-12)17-18(15(11)16)9-5-8-14(19)20;/h2-4,6-7,10,16H,5,8-9H2,1H3,(H,19,20);1H Key: MDCYBLVSLOPFAZ-UHFFFAOYSA-N
- SMILES: CC1=CC(=NN(C1=N)CCCC(=O)O)C2=CC=CC=C2; HCl: CC1=CC(=NN(C1=N)CCCC(=O)O)C2=CC=CC=C2.Cl

Properties
Chemical formula	C_{15}H_{17}N_{3}O_{2}
Molar mass	271.320 g·mol^{−1}
- Except where otherwise noted, data are given for materials in their standard state (at 25 °C [77 °F], 100 kPa). Infobox references

Famiraprinium (also known as SR-95103) is a GABA_{A} receptor antagonist used in scientific research.

It antagonizes certain GABA_{A} receptors with an inhibition constant of 2.2 μM.

== Effects ==
Like other GABA antagonists, it triggers epilepsy-like symptoms. These effects can be antagonized by GABA_{A} agonists like muscimol, proving it is an antagonist.
