= AR-R17779 =

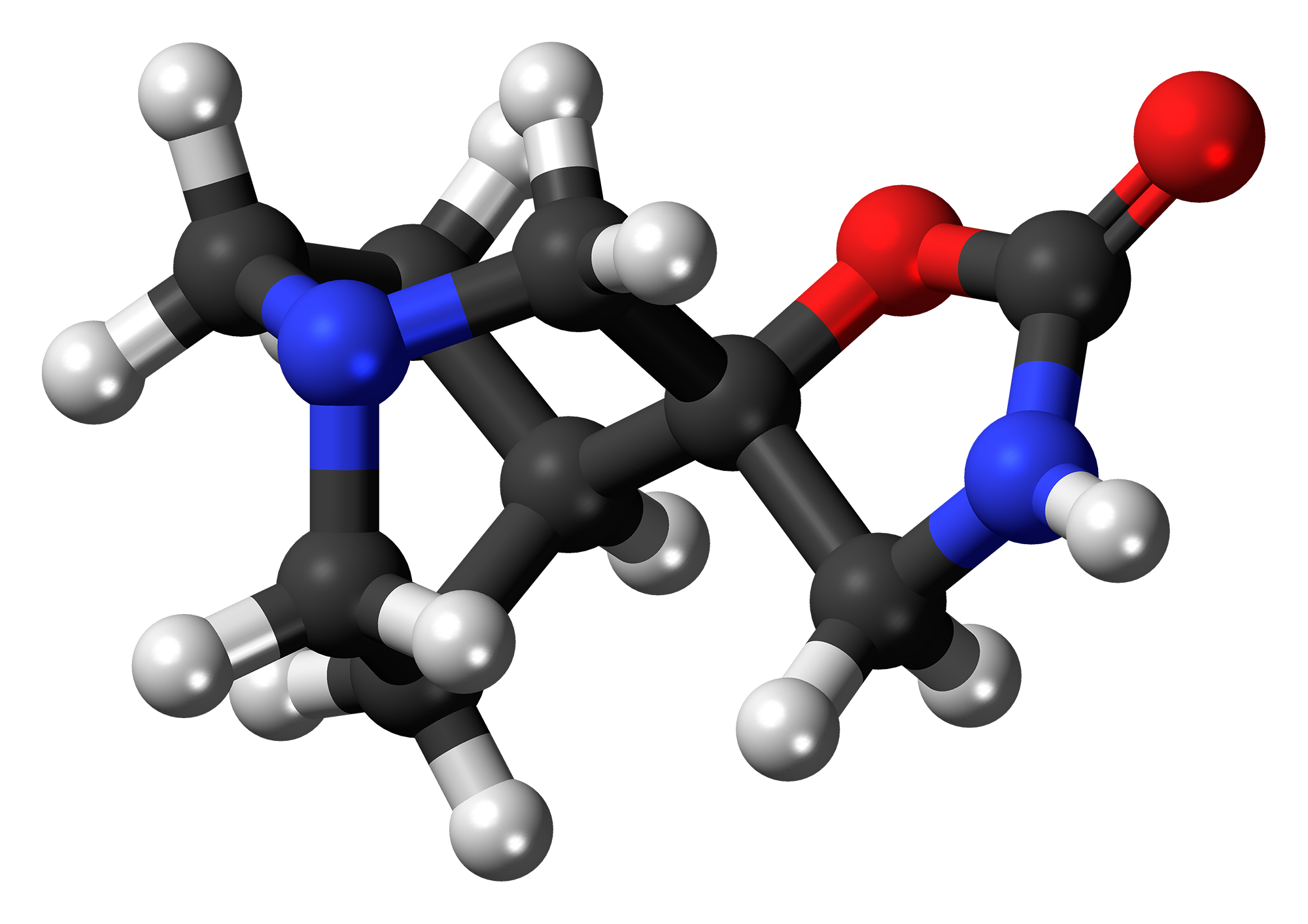

Names
- IUPAC name (2S)-4′-Azaspiro[bicyclo[2.2.2]octane-2,5′-[1,3]oxazolidin]-2′-one
- Other names (−)-Spiro[1-azabicyclo[2.2.2]octane-3,5′-oxazolidin-2′-one]

Identifiers
| CAS Number | 178419-47-1 |
| 3D model (JSmol) | Interactive image |
| ChEBI | CHEBI:CHEBI:420311 |
| ChEMBL | ChEMBL193016 |
| ChemSpider | 4470515 |
| PubChem CID | 5310971 |
| UNII | C3VZ57BN3M |
| CompTox Dashboard (EPA) | DTXSID60415499 |
- InChI: InChI=1S/C9H14N2O2/c12-8-10-5-9(13-8)6-11-3-1-7(9)2-4-11/h7H,1-6H2,(H,10,12)/t9-/m0/s1 Key: TYAGAVRSOFABFO-VIFPVBQEBZ; InChI=1/C9H14N2O2/c12-8-10-5-9(13-8)6-11-3-1-7(9)2-4-11/h7H,1-6H2,(H,10,12)/t9-/m0/s1
- SMILES: O=C3O[C@]1(CN2CCC1CC2)CN3

Properties
| Chemical formula | C_{9}H_{14}N_{2}O_{2} |
| Molar mass | 182.223 g·mol^{−1} |
- Except where otherwise noted, data are given for materials in their standard state (at 25 °C [77 °F], 100 kPa). verify (what is ?) Infobox references

AR-R17779 is a drug that acts as a potent and selective full agonist for the α7 subtype of neural nicotinic acetylcholine receptors. It has nootropic effects in animal studies, but its effects do not substitute for those of nicotine. It has also been studied as a potential novel treatment for arthritis.
