= SIB-1553A =

Names
- Preferred IUPAC name 4-{[2-(1-Methylpyrrolidin-2-yl)ethyl]sulfanyl}phenol

Identifiers
CAS Number	191611-76-4
3D model (JSmol)	Interactive image
ChEMBL	ChEMBL47850
ChemSpider	4470512
PubChem CID	5310968
UNII	TF4A9P6T8R
CompTox Dashboard (EPA)	DTXSID70940803
- InChI: InChI=1S/C13H19NOS/c1-14-9-2-3-11(14)8-10-16-13-6-4-12(15)5-7-13/h4-7,11,15H,2-3,8-10H2,1H3 Key: NVZGJSVPOOILDI-UHFFFAOYSA-N; InChI=1/C13H19NOS/c1-14-9-2-3-11(14)8-10-16-13-6-4-12(15)5-7-13/h4-7,11,15H,2-3,8-10H2,1H3 Key: NVZGJSVPOOILDI-UHFFFAOYAV
- SMILES: OC1=CC=C(SCCC2CCCN2C)C=C1

Properties
Chemical formula	C_{13}H_{19}NOS
Molar mass	237.36 g·mol^{−1}
- Except where otherwise noted, data are given for materials in their standard state (at 25 °C [77 °F], 100 kPa). Infobox references

SIB-1553A is a nicotinic acetylcholine receptor agonist that is selective for receptors with a β_{4} subunit. Administration of SIB-1553A improved memory and attention in a Parkinson's disease model.

== See also ==
- List of investigational cognition and memory disorder drugs
