= PHA-543,613 =

Chemical compound

Identifiers
- IUPAC name: N-[(3R)-1-azabicyclo[2.2.2]oct-3-yl]furo[2,3-c]pyridine-5-carboxamide
- CAS Number: 478149-53-0
- PubChem CID: 11493927
- IUPHAR/BPS: 3998
- ChemSpider: 8105752
- UNII: R36R9KVD6Y
- ChEMBL: ChEMBL214268
- CompTox Dashboard (EPA): DTXSID6047284
- ECHA InfoCard: 100.189.975

Chemical and physical data
- Formula: C_{15}H_{17}N_{3}O_{2}
- Molar mass: 271.320 g·mol^{−1}
- 3D model (JSmol): Interactive image
- SMILES: C1CN2CCC1[C@H](C2)NC(=O)C3=NC=C4C(=C3)C=CO4
- InChI: InChI=1S/C15H17N3O2/c19-15(12-7-11-3-6-20-14(11)8-16-12)17-13-9-18-4-1-10(13)2-5-18/h3,6-8,10,13H,1-2,4-5,9H2,(H,17,19)/t13-/m0/s1; Key:IPKZCLGGYKRDES-ZDUSSCGKSA-N

PHA-543,613 is a drug that acts as a potent and selective agonist for the α7 subtype of neural nicotinic acetylcholine receptors, with a high level of brain penetration and good oral bioavailability. It is under development as a possible treatment for cognitive deficits in schizophrenia. It reduces excitotoxicity and protects striatal dopaminergic neurons in rat models. It also potentiates cognitive enhancement from memantine, decreases dynorphin release and inhibits GSK-B3.

== See also ==
- Nefiracetam
