= WAY-317538 =

Chemical compound

Legal status
- Legal status: In general: legal

Identifiers
- IUPAC name: 5-Morpholin-4-yl-pentanoic acid (4-pyridin-3-yl-phenyl)-amide
- CAS Number: 874450-44-9
- PubChem CID: 45484303; HCl: 45484302
- ChemSpider: 24663034
- UNII: M92TU1EZ75
- ChEMBL: ChEMBL1084615; HCl: ChEMBL565540
- CompTox Dashboard (EPA): DTXSID30670437

Chemical and physical data
- Formula: C_{20}H_{25}N_{3}O_{2}
- Molar mass: 339.439 g·mol^{−1}
- 3D model (JSmol): Interactive image; HCl: Interactive image
- SMILES: C3COCCN3CCCCC(=O)Nc1ccc(cc1)-c2cccnc2; HCl: C1COCCN1CCCCC(=O)NC2=CC=C(C=C2)C3=CN=CC=C3.Cl
- InChI: InChI=1S/C20H25N3O2/c24-20(5-1-2-11-23-12-14-25-15-13-23)22-19-8-6-17(7-9-19)18-4-3-10-21-16-18/h3-4,6-10,16H,1-2,5,11-15H2,(H,22,24); Key:XCHIZTUBUXZESJ-UHFFFAOYSA-N; HCl: InChI=1S/C20H25N3O2.ClH/c24-20(5-1-2-11-23-12-14-25-15-13-23)22-19-8-6-17(7-9-19)18-4-3-10-21-16-18;/h3-4,6-10,16H,1-2,5,11-15H2,(H,22,24);1H; Key:GBMDUJQQSGOIFW-UHFFFAOYSA-N

WAY-317538 (SEN-12333) is a drug that acts as a potent and selective full agonist for the α7 subtype of neural nicotinic acetylcholine receptors. It was not the most potent compound in the series, but was selected for further development on the basis of its high selectivity over related receptors, ease of synthesis, and good in vivo properties including high oral bioavailability and good brain penetration. It has nootropic and neuroprotective effects in animal studies, and is being investigated as a potential treatment for neurodegenerative and neurocognitive conditions including Alzheimer's disease and schizophrenia.
