= Bradanicline =

Chemical compound

Clinical data
- Other names: TC-5619

Identifiers
- IUPAC name: N-[(2S,3R)-2-(Pyridin-3-ylmethyl)-1-azabicyclo[2.2.2]oct-3-yl]-1-benzofuran-2- carboxamide
- CAS Number: 639489-84-2
- PubChem CID: 16727410
- IUPHAR/BPS: 3969
- ChemSpider: 20559152
- UNII: UM3821998K
- KEGG: D10613
- ChEMBL: ChEMBL1258006
- CompTox Dashboard (EPA): DTXSID40213778

Chemical and physical data
- Formula: C_{22}H_{23}N_{3}O_{2}
- Molar mass: 361.445 g·mol^{−1}
- 3D model (JSmol): Interactive image
- SMILES: C1CN2CCC1[C@@H]([C@@H]2CC3=CN=CC=C3)NC(=O)C4=CC5=CC=CC=C5O4
- InChI: InChI=1S/C22H23N3O2/c26-22(20-13-17-5-1-2-6-19(17)27-20)24-21-16-7-10-25(11-8-16)18(21)12-15-4-3-9-23-14-15/h1-6,9,13-14,16,18,21H,7-8,10-12H2,(H,24,26)/t18-,21-/m0/s1; Key:OXKRFEWMSWPKKV-RXVVDRJESA-N

Bradanicline (INN; development code TC-5619) is a drug which was being developed by Targacept that acts as a partial agonist at the α7 subtype of the neural nicotinic acetylcholine receptors. It showed cognitive enhancing effects in animal studies, and was being developed through a collaboration between Targacept and AstraZeneca as a potential treatment for schizophrenia and attention deficit disorder. Phase I clinical trials were completed successfully, and it was in phase II trials.

In May 2011, AstraZeneca declined to exercise its right to license the compound. In September 2012, Targacept ended its development of badanicline for the purpose of treating ADHD in adults. It was being studied for cognitive and memory enhancement.

Bradanicline was discontinued for Alzheimer's disease and cognitive impairment in schizophrenia in late-2013. It was also discontinued for ADHD.

== See also ==
- List of investigational cognition and memory disorder drugs
