= C15H15NO2S =

The molecular formula C_{15}H_{15}NO_{2}S (molar mass: 273.35 g/mol, exact mass: 273.0823 u) may refer to:

- Armodafinil
- Esmodafinil
- Modafinil
