= C15H15NO3S =

The molecular formula C_{15}H_{15}NO_{3}S (molar mass: 289.35 g/mol) may refer to:

- Adrafinil
- Modafinil sulfone
