= Frank Baldino Jr. =

American scientist

Frank Baldino Jr. (May 13, 1953 – December 16, 2010) was an American pharmacologist and scientist who was one of the co-founders of the pharmaceutical firm Cephalon, a company that was formed in 1987 and had grown to annual sales of $2.8 billion and net income of $425 million in 2010.

== Biography ==
Baldino was born on May 13, 1953, in Passaic, New Jersey. He grew up in Bergen County, New Jersey and Bucks County, Pennsylvania, graduating from Pennsbury High School. He earned his undergraduate degree at Muhlenberg College and was awarded a doctorate in pharmacology from Temple University. After a Postdoctoral Fellowship in pharmacology at Robert Wood Johnson Medical School in New Jersey, he joined DuPont, where, as a Senior Researcher, he investigated prospective pharmaceutical products for the company.

After leaving DuPont, Baldino co-founded Cephalon in 1987 at the age of 33. Its best known product has been modafinil, which the firm markets under the brand name Provigil, which has been approved by the Food and Drug Administration for use in treating narcolepsy, shift work sleep disorder, and excessive daytime sleepiness resulting from sleep apnea, though the FDA has held off on approving its use for treating jet lag.

In marketing Provigil, Baldino emphasized that "there are no warts on this drug" and the product became a best seller for its off-label use by individuals seeking to maintain alertness and combat fatigue without the side effects of caffeine and amphetamines, with off-label uses accounting for 90% of sales by 2004. The current market size of Provigil is over US$1,120 million in 2010 while Nuvigil is expected to reach revenue of US$700 million by 2013 . Baldino said that his "only question is how big we can make it". Brenda D. Gavin of Quaker Bio Ventures credited Baldino as one of the "really, really rare" people who were able to found a company and then build it over the years as its chief executive.

Cephalon settled a lawsuit for $17 million in which it faced claims that Baldino and other company executives had overstated the potential for a drug aimed at treating amyotrophic lateral sclerosis (known informally as Lou Gehrig's disease). The Federal Trade Commission claimed that Cephalon had made improper deals to postpone the availability of generic versions of modafinil and the firm paid over $400 million in 2007 in response to allegations that the firm had improperly marketed its pharmaceutical products.

A resident of West Chester, Pennsylvania, Baldino had been on leave from his duties at Cephalon starting in August 2010 as he sought medical treatment and his responsibilities were overseen by Chief Operating Officer J. Kevin Buchi. He died at the Hospital of the University of Pennsylvania in Philadelphia at the age of 57 on December 16, 2010, due to complications of leukemia. He was survived by his wife, as well as by a daughter and four sons.

An agreement was announced in May 2011, under which Cephalon would be acquired by Teva Pharmaceutical Industries in a deal valued at $6.8 billion.
