= Narcolepsy (disambiguation) =

Narcolepsy is a neurological condition most characterized by Excessive Daytime Sleepiness (EDS).

Narcolepsy may also refer to:

- "Narcolepsy" (Third Eye Blind song), 1997
- "Narcolepsy" (Ben Folds Five song), 1999

== See also ==
- Pediatric narcolepsy, cases of narcolepsy that begin during childhood
- "Narcoleptic", a song by Placebo from their 2000 album Black Market Music
