= Cephalon =

Cephalon may refer to:

- Cephalon (arthropod head)
- Cephalon (company)
