= Modafinil =

Wakefulness-promoting medication

- Modafinil skeletal formula

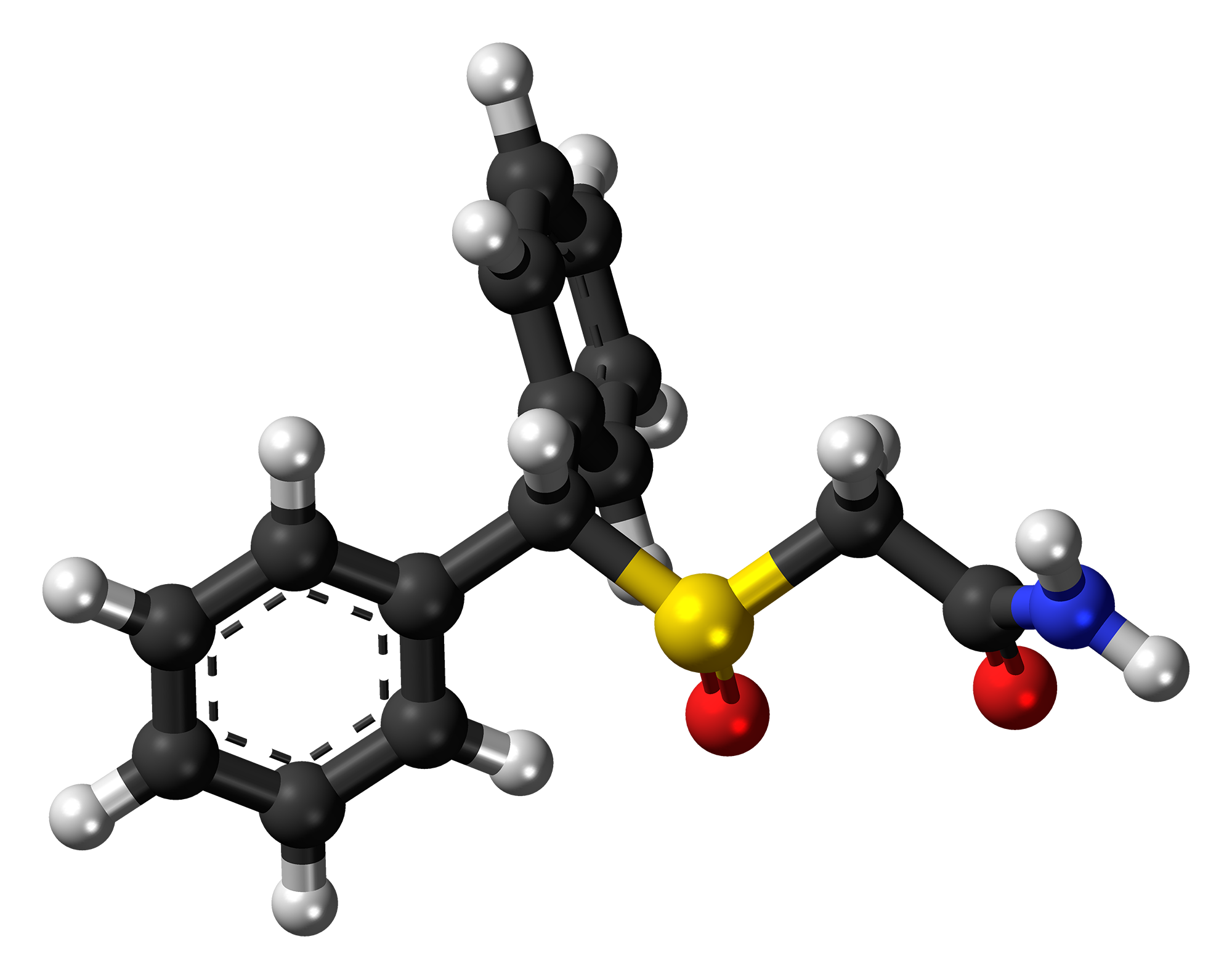
- Esmodafinil ball-and-stick model

Clinical data
- Trade names: Provigil, others
- Other names: CRL-40476; CRL40476; CRC-40476; CRC40476; CEP-1538; CEP1538; DEP-1538; DEP1538; Diphenylmethyl-sulfinylacetamide
- AHFS/Drugs.com: Monograph
- MedlinePlus: a602016
- License data: US DailyMed: Modafinil
- Pregnancy category: AU: D
- Dependence liability: Relatively low
- Addiction liability: Low
- Routes of administration: Oral (tablets)
- Drug class: Stimulant; Dopamine reuptake inhibitor; Wakefulness-promoting agent
- ATC code: N06BA07 (WHO)

Legal status
- Legal status: AU: S4 (Prescription only); BR: Class B1 (Psychoactive drugs); CA: ℞-only; UK: POM (Prescription only); US: Schedule IV; SE: Förteckning IV

Pharmacokinetic data
- Bioavailability: 40%–65% (based on urinary excretion)
- Protein binding: ~60% (mainly to albumin)
- Metabolism: Liver (amide hydrolysis, S-oxidation, aromatic ring hydroxylation, glucuronide conjugation; CYP1A2, CYP2B6, CYP2C9, CYP2C19, CYP3A4, CYP3A5 involved)
- Metabolites: Modafinil acid (35%–65%); Modafinil sulfone
- Onset of action: 2–4 h (peak)
- Elimination half-life: Modafinil: 12–15 h Armodafinil: 10–17 h Esmodafinil: 3–5 h
- Duration of action: 11.5 h
- Excretion: Urine: 80% (≤10% as modafinil, 35%–51% as modafinil acid); Feces: 1.0%

Identifiers
- IUPAC name: 2-(diphenylmethanesulfinyl)acetamide
- CAS Number: 68693-11-8
- PubChem CID: 4236
- IUPHAR/BPS: 7555
- DrugBank: DB00745
- ChemSpider: 4088
- UNII: R3UK8X3U3D
- KEGG: D01832
- ChEBI: CHEBI:31859
- ChEMBL: ChEMBL1373
- CompTox Dashboard (EPA): DTXSID0023329
- ECHA InfoCard: 100.168.719

Chemical and physical data
- Formula: C_{15}H_{15}NO_{2}S
- Molar mass: 273.35 g·mol^{−1}
- 3D model (JSmol): Interactive image
- SMILES: O=S(C(c1ccccc1)c2ccccc2)CC(=O)N
- InChI: InChI=1S/C15H15NO2S/c16-14(17)11-19(18)15(12-7-3-1-4-8-12)13-9-5-2-6-10-13/h1-10,15H,11H2,(H2,16,17); Key:YFGHCGITMMYXAQ-UHFFFAOYSA-N

Modafinil, sold under the brand name Provigil among others, is a central nervous system (CNS) stimulant medication used to treat narcolepsy, sleep apnea, and shift work sleep disorder. It is administered orally. Modafinil is a first-line treatment for narcolepsy in the United States and Europe.

The mechanism of action is not fully understood, but modafinil acts mainly as an atypical dopamine reuptake inhibitor, increasing dopamine levels without the rapid or overt signaling seen with classical stimulants such as amphetamine or cocaine. Unlike these drugs, modafinil has low addiction and dependence potential and does not produce strong euphoria, which contributes to its classification as a Schedule IV controlled substance in the United States. It is a prescription medication in most countries.

Modafinil is generally well-tolerated; common side effects include headache, nausea, anxiety, and insomnia. Rare but serious adverse effects include severe skin reactions such as Stevens–Johnson syndrome. Modafinil is contraindicated during pregnancy due to increased risk of birth defects.

Modafinil is used off-label as a cognitive enhancer by students and professionals seeking improved focus. Research on cognitive effects in non-sleep-deprived individuals has yielded mixed results. Modafinil is banned in competitive sports by the World Anti-Doping Agency.

Modafinil was developed in France in the 1970s by neurophysiologist Michel Jouvet. The drug was approved for medical use in France in 1994 and in the United States in 1998. Generic versions became available in the US in 2012.

== Uses ==
=== Medical ===
==== Sleep disorders ====
Modafinil, a eugeroic or wakefulness-promoting drug, is used for treating narcolepsy, a sleep disorder characterized by excessive daytime sleepiness and sudden sleep attacks. Being a central nervous system (CNS) stimulant itself, modafinil has lower addictive potential than classical stimulants such as amphetamine, cocaine, or methylphenidate, but still produces psychoactive and subjective effects typical of classical stimulants.

Narcolepsy causes a strong urge to sleep during the day and can include symptoms like cataplexy (sudden muscle weakness), sleep paralysis (inability to move or speak while falling asleep or waking up), and hallucinations. Narcolepsy is linked to a lack of the brain chemical hypocretin (orexin), primarily produced in the hypothalamus. Modafinil is not a cure for narcolepsy, but it can help manage the symptoms. While modafinil is used to treat excessive sleepiness, it may also help reduce the frequency and severity of cataplexy attacks in some people. Modafinil is approved for management of narcolepsy with or without cataplexy. However, it is not specifically approved for the treatment of cataplexy.

Modafinil is also prescribed for shift work sleep disorder, a condition affecting people who work rotating or night shifts and experience excessive sleepiness during work hours and difficulty sleeping during the day. The recommended dose for this indication is 200 mg taken approximately one hour before the start of the work shift. In a 12-week randomized controlled trial, modafinil significantly improved nighttime wakefulness as measured by sleep latency testing, reduced attention lapses, and lowered the rate of accidents or near-accidents during the commute home from work. However, residual sleepiness remained substantial even with treatment, and modafinil did not fully normalize alertness to daytime levels. A separate trial found that modafinil also improved patient functioning and mental health-related quality of life in shift workers. A Cochrane review concluded that modafinil and armodafinil increase alertness and reduce sleepiness in shift workers to some extent, but noted that evidence remains limited and the drugs are associated with adverse events including headache and nausea.

Modafinil performs moderately as a drug to overcome excessive daytime sleepiness caused by obstructive sleep apnea. People with apnea should typically use a continuous positive airway pressure apparatus to prevent apnea before starting modafinil. When obstructive sleep apnea is comorbid with narcolepsy, modafinil is an effective drug to reduce the associated excessive daytime sleepiness.

Both the American Academy of Sleep Medicine and European guidelines strongly recommend modafinil as a first-line treatment for narcolepsy. In France, modafinil is the first-line pharmacological treatment for excessive daytime sleepiness in narcolepsy, with methylphenidate designated as second-line.

==== Multiple sclerosis-related fatigue ====
Fatigue is a common and often debilitating symptom experienced by people with multiple sclerosis.

Reviews and meta-analyses of controlled trials have found that modafinil has modest effectiveness in managing MS-related fatigue, though improvements in fatigue severity scores have not consistently reached statistical significance. Optimal dosing and treatment schedules are not well established. Clinical assessments have found that adverse events were common. Most MS organizations are neutral on the off-label use of modafinil to alleviate fatigue associated with MS.

==== Attention deficit hyperactivity disorder ====
Modafinil is occasionally prescribed off-label for individuals with attention deficit hyperactivity disorder (ADHD). It has not consistently shown efficacy in treating adult ADHD, especially when compared to other treatments such as lisdexamfetamine. In children, modafinil shows efficacy for ADHD symptoms in clinical trials, though it is less effective than first-line treatments such as methylphenidate and amphetamines.

Modafinil was investigated for ADHD because of its lower abuse potential than conventional psychostimulants, but evidence for adult ADHD is mixed. A 2016 systematic review did not recommend its use, and a large Phase III trial found modafinil ineffective with a high rate of side effects (86%) and discontinuation (47%), possibly due to high doses (210–510 mg/d). A 2008 US Food and Drug Administration application for pediatric ADHD was denied due to concerns about rare but serious dermatological toxicity.

Modafinil is considered a second-line treatment for comorbid ADHD and bipolar disorder, after psychostimulants and bupropion.

==== Bipolar disorder ====
Modafinil is used off-label as an adjunctive treatment for the acute depressive phase of bipolar disorder. Meta-analyses have found that add-on modafinil and armodafinil are more effective than placebo for treatment response and remission, with low rates of mood switching to mania, but the effect sizes are small and the quality of evidence is low. Modafinil may also have cognitive benefits in people with bipolar disorder who are in remission.

=== Occupational ===
Military forces in several countries, including France, the United States, and the United Kingdom, have used modafinil as an alternative to amphetamines for managing fatigue during combat operations and extended missions. The US Air Force approved modafinil for specific missions as a fatigue countermeasure. Modafinil is also available to astronauts aboard the International Space Station for fatigue management.

=== Non-medical ===
Modafinil has been used non-medically as a "smart drug" by various groups, including students, office workers, and transhumanists.

The reported effect ranges from a significant increase in cognitive abilities to a mild or absent improvement. In some cases, it has been associated with impairments in certain cognitive functions. It has been shown that a positive impact on cognitive abilities is more noticeable on sleep-deprived individuals. Therefore, in people who are not sleep-deprived, the potential of modafinil as a cognitive enhancer may be limited.

=== Sports ===
The regulation of modafinil as a doping agent has been controversial in sport since several American athletes tested positive for the substance. Some athletes who used modafinil protested that it was not on the prohibited list at the time of their offenses. However, the World Anti-Doping Agency (WADA) maintains that modafinil was related to already-banned substances. The Agency added modafinil to its list of prohibited substances on August 3, 2004, ten days before the start of the 2004 Summer Olympics.

Several athletes across track and field, cycling, basketball, and rowing have tested positive for modafinil and faced sanctions, with some cases resulting in stripped medals and bans.

The BALCO scandal brought to light an unsubstantiated (but widely published) account of Major League Baseball's all-time leading home-run hitter Barry Bonds' supplemental chemical regimen that included modafinil in addition to anabolic steroids and human growth hormone.

=== Available forms ===
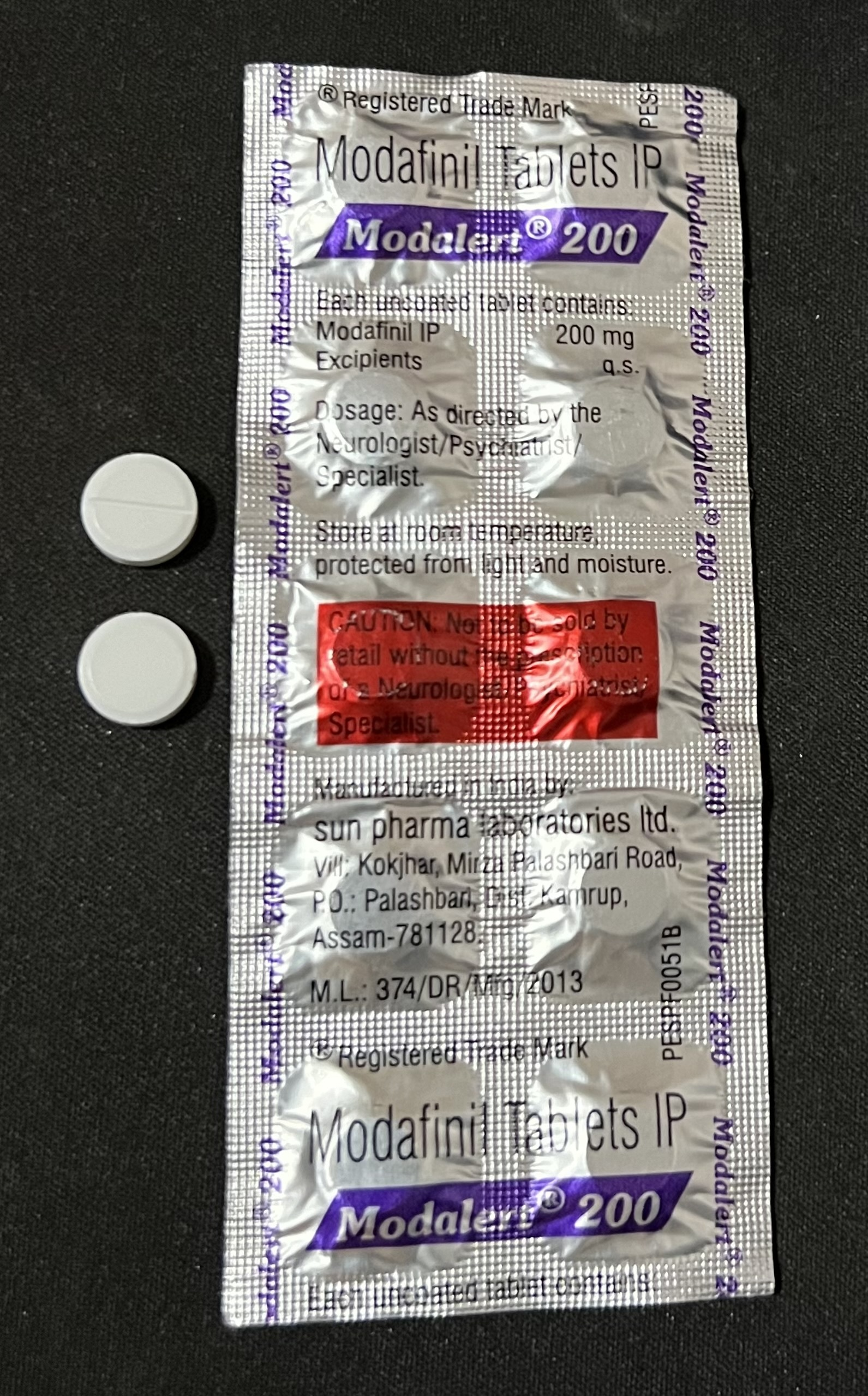
Modafinil tablets – Modalert 200 (Sun Pharma)

Modafinil is commercially available in 100 mg and 200 mg oral tablet forms. Additionally, it is offered as the (R)-enantiomer, known as armodafinil, and as a prodrug named adrafinil. Armodafinil is available in 50, 150, 200, and 250 mg tablets. A 100 mg dose of modafinil has been said to be essentially equivalent to a 50 mg dose of armodafinil in terms of drug levels.

== Contraindications ==
Modafinil is contraindicated (should not be used) during pregnancy and 2 months before getting pregnant. Women who take modafinil should not become pregnant, and, additionally, should be aware that modafinil reduces effectiveness of hormonal contraceptives, increasing chances of getting pregnant. Modafinil therapy during pregnancy increases the risk of birth defects, such as with congenital torticollis (twisted neck), hypospadias (a urethral abnormality), and congenital heart defects.

Modafinil is contraindicated for individuals with known hypersensitivity (allergic reaction) to either modafinil or armodafinil.

Modafinil is also contraindicated in certain cardiac conditions, including uncontrolled moderate to severe hypertension, arrhythmia, cor pulmonale, and in cases with signs of CNS stimulant-induced mitral valve prolapse or left ventricular hypertrophy. These contraindications arise because modafinil elicits sympathomedullary activation, producing notable increases in heart rate and blood pressure that can worsen pre-existing cardiovascular conditions.

Modafinil is also contraindicated in people with galactose intolerance, lactase deficiency, or glucose-galactose malabsorption (inherited conditions affecting the digestion of certain sugars, relevant because modafinil tablets contain lactose monohydrate as an inactive ingredient).

== Adverse effects ==
Modafinil is generally well-tolerated but can have potential risks and side effects. Common adverse effects of modafinil, experienced by less than 10% of users, include headaches, nausea, and reduced appetite. Anxiety, insomnia, dizziness, diarrhea, and rhinitis (nasal congestion) are also reported in 5%–10% of users. Psychiatric reactions have occurred in individuals with and without a preexisting psychiatric history. Urinary retention (difficulty emptying the bladder) and paresthesia (tingling or numbness) have also been reported.

Modafinil has been found to have sympathomimetic effects, including increasing heart rate, blood pressure, and orthostatic elevations in norepinephrine levels. Modafinil can cause a slight increase in aminotransferase enzymes, indicative of liver function, but there is no evidence of serious liver damage when levels are within reference ranges. Case reports of modafinil-associated hypersexuality and spontaneous orgasms and ejaculations exist.

Rare but serious adverse effects include severe skin rashes and allergy-related symptoms. Between December 1998 and January 2007, the US Food and Drug Administration (FDA) received reports of six cases of severe cutaneous adverse reactions, including erythema multiforme (target-shaped skin lesions), Stevens–Johnson syndrome, toxic epidermal necrolysis (widespread skin peeling), and DRESS syndrome (a drug reaction involving rash and organ inflammation). The FDA has issued alerts regarding these risks and also noted reports of angioedema and multi-organ hypersensitivity reactions in postmarketing surveillance. In 2007, the FDA required Cephalon, the manufacturer of Provigil, to modify the Provigil leaflet to include warnings about these serious conditions. The long-term safety and effectiveness of modafinil have not been conclusively established.

The FDA does not endorse modafinil for children's medical conditions due to an increased risk of rare but serious dermatological toxicity, manifested as Stevens–Johnson syndrome which is a type of severe skin reaction. However, in Europe, modafinil may be prescribed for treating narcolepsy in children.

=== Tolerance ===
Clinical research has not demonstrated drug tolerance, a reduction in wakefulness-promoting and anti-fatigue effects, as a common outcome, even with therapeutic use extending up to 40 weeks. However, long-term use can lead to tolerance in some individuals, necessitating higher doses to maintain efficacy. People with current or past substance addictions and those with a family history of addiction are at higher risk. The underlying mechanisms, which may involve dopamine and norepinephrine pathways, are not fully understood. Tolerance appears more likely with off-label use for cognitive enhancement than with therapeutic use for narcolepsy, where effectiveness does not usually diminish with prolonged treatment.

=== Addiction and dependence ===
Although classified as a central nervous system (CNS) stimulant, the addiction and dependence liabilities of modafinil are considered low. The exact mechanisms of action of modafinil are not known, and its pharmacological profile differs from that of the classical stimulants such as cocaine or amphetamine. Although modafinil shares biochemical mechanisms with stimulant drugs, it is less likely to have mood-elevating properties. The similarities in effects with caffeine are not clearly established. Unlike other stimulants, modafinil does not induce a strong subjective feeling of pleasure or reward or euphoria, which contributes to its lower abuse potential. Albeit to a lower degree than classical stimulants, modafinil still can produce psychoactive, euphoric, and subjective effects typical for abused stimulants.

Despite initial assessments of low abuse potential, some evidence indicates modafinil acts on the same neurobiological mechanisms as other addictive stimulants, which is a reason for caution when prescribing. Modafinil scores lower than amphetamine on standardized abuse-potential assessments, suggesting reduced propensity for abuse.

The US Drug Enforcement Administration has classified modafinil as a Schedule IV controlled substance; the medicine is recognized for having valid medical uses with low addiction potential. The International Narcotics Control Board does not classify it as a narcotic or a psychotropic substance.

== Overdose ==
An overdose of modafinil can lead to a range of symptoms and complications. Psychiatric symptoms may include psychosis, mania, hallucinations, and suicidal ideation, which can occur even in individuals without a history of mental illness and may persist after discontinuation of modafinil. Neurological complications, such as seizures, tremors, dystonia (involuntary muscle contractions), and dyskinesia (uncontrolled movements), may arise from modafinil's interaction with various neurotransmitter systems.

Allergic reactions such as rash, angioedema (swelling beneath the skin), anaphylaxis (a severe whole-body allergic reaction), and Stevens–Johnson syndrome (a serious skin and mucous membrane disorder) may rarely be triggered by an immunological response to modafinil or its metabolites. Cardiovascular complications like hypertension, tachycardia (rapid heart rate), chest pain, and arrhythmias may also occur because modafinil stimulates the sympathetic nervous system.

In animal studies, the median lethal dose (LD_{50}) of modafinil varies among species and depends on the route of administration. In mice and rats, the LD_{50} is approximately 1250 mg/kg if administered via an injection, but the oral LD_{50} for rats is 3400 mg/kg. The LD_{50} value for humans have not been established. Human clinical trials have involved total daily doses up to 1200 mg/d for 7–21 days. Acute one-time total overdoses up to 4500 mg have not been life-threatening but resulted in symptoms like agitation, insomnia, tremor, palpitations, and gastrointestinal disturbances.

The management of modafinil overdose involves supportive care, monitoring of vital signs, and treatment of specific complications. In cases of recent consumption, activated charcoal, gastric lavage (stomach pumping), or hemodialysis (blood filtering) may be used. There is no specific antidote for modafinil overdose. The main way to deal with modafinil overdose is supportive care, which includes sedating the patient and stabilizing their blood pressure, and muscle activity in case of manifestations such as agitation or tremor.

== Interactions ==
Some of the drugs that frequently interact with modafinil include aripiprazole (an antipsychotic), amphetamine (including its enantiomers and salts; stimulants), and others.

Modafinil is a weak to moderate inducer of CYP3A4 and a weak inhibitor of CYP2C19, enzymes of the cytochrome P450 system. Modafinil also induces or inhibits other cytochrome P450 enzymes. One in vitro study predicts that modafinil may induce the cytochrome P450 enzymes CYP1A2, CYP3A4, and CYP2B6, as well as may inhibit CYP2C9 and CYP2C19. However, other in-vitro work has shown no significant inhibition of CYP2C9. Modafinil may induce P-glycoprotein, which may affect drugs transported by P-glycoprotein, such as digoxin.

In clinical use, modafinil affects the pharmacokinetics of drugs metabolized by CYP3A4 and other cytochrome P450 enzymes, with these interactions observed in patients. For instance, CYP3A4 induction by modafinil can reduce plasma concentrations of opioids such as methadone, hydrocodone, oxycodone, and fentanyl, potentially causing reduced efficacy or withdrawal symptoms. Modafinil also affects steroid hormones, including estradiol, progesterone, and cortisol, and can reduce the effectiveness of hormonal contraceptives for up to a month after discontinuation. Since modafinil induces the activity of the CYP3A4 enzyme involved in cortisol clearance, modafinil may reduce the bioavailability of hydrocortisone. Therefore, it may be necessary to adjust the steroid substitution dose in people receiving modafinil, which is a CYP3A4-metabolism-inducing drug.

Hypertensive crises have been reported when armodafinil (one of modafinil's enantiomers) has been taken with monoamine oxidase inhibitors like tranylcypromine.

== Pharmacology ==
=== Pharmacodynamics ===
Modafinil activity profile
Site	Potency	Type	Species	Refs
DAT	1.8–2.6 μM; 4.8 μM; 6.4 μM; 4.0 μM	K_{i} K_{i} IC_{50}^{a} IC_{50}^{a}	Human; Rat; Human; Rat	
NET	>10 μM >92 μM; 35.6 μM; 136 μM	K_{i} K_{i} IC_{50}^{a} IC_{50}^{a}	Human; Rat; Human; Rat	
SERT	>10 μM; 46.6 μM >500 μM >50 μM	K_{i} K_{i} IC_{50}^{a} IC_{50}^{a}	Human; Rat; Human; Rat	
D_{2}	>10 μM; 16 μM^{b} 120 μM^{b}	K_{i} K_{i} EC_{50}^{a}	Human; Rat; Rat	
Footnotes: ^{a} = Functional activity, not binding inhibition. ^{b} = Armodafinil at D_{2}^{High}. Notes: No activity at a variety of other assessed targets.

Modafinil's precise mechanism of action in narcolepsy and other sleep disorders remains incompletely understood. Nevertheless, in animals and in humans modafinil acts primarily as an atypical dopamine transporter (DAT) inhibitor or dopamine reuptake inhibitor (DRI), producing a modest increase in extracellular dopamine in cortical and striatal brain regions without inducing the rapid dopamine signaling characteristic of classical stimulants such as amphetamine or cocaine.

This modest dopaminergic effect is accompanied by broader downstream activation of arousal-related neurotransmitter systems. Modafinil increases noradrenergic tone in wakefulness-promoting nuclei and indirectly engages hypothalamic orexin and histamine pathways, which together help stabilize the sleep–wake regulatory network and support sustained alertness. Although modafinil interacts with multiple neurotransmitter systems, its exact mode of action at the molecular level remains uncertain.

At the level of neural circuits, modafinil enhances glutamatergic excitatory transmission and reduces GABAergic inhibitory output within cortical and thalamic pathways, shifting network activity toward excitation and cortical activation while exerting minimal direct effects on classical monoamine receptors. These actions, including weak DAT inhibition combined with secondary catecholaminergic, orexinergic, glutamatergic, and GABAergic modulation, are thought to underlie modafinil's ability to promote wakefulness and cognitive function with a lower risk of euphoria and abuse than traditional amphetamine-like psychostimulants.

From laboratory research, modafinil has little to no affinity for serotonin or norepinephrine transporters and does not directly interact with these systems. However, studies have shown that elevated concentrations of norepinephrine and serotonin can occur as an indirect effect following modafinil administration due to increased extracellular dopamine activity. Unlike traditional psychostimulant drugs, such as cocaine or amphetamine, modafinil shows low potential for causing euphoria due to differences in how it interacts with dopamine transporters at a cellular level.

In addition to its influence on dopaminergic pathways, modafinil may impact other neurotransmitter systems, such as orexin (hypocretin) and histamine. Orexinergic and histaminergic neurons are involved in promoting wakefulness and regulating arousal states. Modafinil may increase signaling within hypothalamic orexin and histamine pathways, potentially contributing to its wake-promoting effects. In animal models, modafinil-induced increases in hypothalamic histamine release require intact orexinergic neurons.

The wake-promoting effects of modafinil do not appear to depend on the orexin system. Modafinil promotes wakefulness in narcoleptic dogs with non-functional orexin 2 receptors and in humans with type 1 narcolepsy, which is characterized by a marked loss of orexin-producing neurons. In contrast, the wake-promoting effects of modafinil are abolished in dopamine transporter knockout mice. The effects of modafinil on histamine, orexin, and other non-catecholaminergic systems may be secondary to its catecholaminergic effects.

=== Pharmacokinetics ===
==== Absorption ====
Modafinil is readily absorbed with oral administration. The oral bioavailability of modafinil is unknown. No value is established because modafinil is water-insoluble and cannot be administered intravenously. However, based on excretion studies, at least 40 to 65% of a dose of modafinil is absorbed. The pharmacokinetics of modafinil are linear or dose-proportional over a range of 200 to 800 mg orally.

The time to peak levels of modafinil is typically 2 to 4 hours. Food slightly slows the absorption of modafinil, by 0.5 to 1 hour, but does not affect the total area under the curve (AUC). Modafinil reached steady-state levels after 2 to 4 days of once-daily administration. There is 1.5-fold accumulation of modafinil with continuous administration.

Modafinil and armodafinil show similar peak levels and times to peak levels in directly comparative studies. Due to armodafinil having a longer elimination half-life than esmodafinil however, armodafinil constitutes 90% of modafinil levels at steady state with modafinil therapy.

==== Distribution ====
The apparent volume of distribution of modafinil is 0.326 to 0.8 L/kg body weight. The plasma protein binding of modafinil is approximately 60%. It is mostly (90%) bound to albumin. Both armodafinil and esmodafinil are substrates of P-glycoprotein, but the clinical significance of this is unknown.

==== Metabolism ====
Modafinil is metabolized mainly in the liver. It is metabolized mainly via amide hydrolysis into modafinil acid by esterases and/or amidases. In addition, modafinil is metabolized to a lesser extent by sulfoxidation via cytochrome P450 CYP3A4 and CYP3A5 into modafinil sulfone. The drug is also metabolized via aromatic ring hydroxylation and by subsequent conjugation via glucuronidation.

The two major circulating metabolites of modafinil are modafinil acid and modafinil sulfone. Both of these metabolites have been described as inactive, and neither appears to contribute to the wakefulness-promoting effects of modafinil. However, modafinil sulfone does appear to possess anticonvulsant effects, a property that it shares with modafinil.

==== Elimination ====
Modafinil is eliminated 90% via metabolism and 10% via renal excretion. Modafinil, given as a single dose in radiolabeled form, is excreted 80% in urine and 1% in feces by 11 days post-administration. Urinary recovery as the major metabolite modafinil acid has been found to be 35 to 51% of a dose. Less than 10% of modafinil is excreted unchanged in urine.

The elimination half-life of modafinil is in the range of 12 to 15 hours There is individual variation in this parameter depending on sex, cytochrome P450 genotypes, liver function, and renal function.

The individual enantiomers of modafinil, armodafinil and esmodafinil, have substantially different pharmacokinetics due to differing elimination profiles. Both armodafinil and esmodafinil are eliminated in a monophasic manner. However, armodafinil has a half-life of 10 to 17 hours, while esmodafinil has a half-life of 3 to 5 hours (3–4 times shorter). Consequently, modafinil has a biphasic elimination profile, with esmodafinil being eliminated much more rapidly than armodafinil. Armodafinil and modafinil have shown virtually identical elimination half-lives of approximately 12 to 16 hours in directly comparative studies. However, due to the biphasic elimination profile of modafinil, armodafinil shows higher levels than modafinil from 4 to 6 hours after administration and about 40% higher area-under-the-curve (AUC) levels than modafinil. Moreover, armodafinil showed 42% lower peak-to-trough variation than modafinil with once-daily administration at steady state. Because of the preceding, modafinil has a shorter duration and less stable levels than armodafinil.

==== Specific populations ====
Modafinil exhibits sex-specific pharmacokinetic differences. It demonstrates higher bioavailability in women compared to men. The mean C_{max} is higher in women than in men, 5.2 mg/L vs. 4.2 mg/L (p < 0.05), following a single 200 mg oral dose of modafinil. This difference persists even after adjusting for body weight (0.88 ml/min/kg vs. 0.72 ml/min/kg). The clearance of modafinil is 30% higher in men than in women, and plasma concentrations after a single dose are significantly higher in women than in men. These sex-specific pharmacokinetic differences may have implications for the efficacy and safety of modafinil.

== Chemistry ==
=== Enantiomers ===
Armodafinil ((R)-(-)-modafinil)

Esmodafinil ((S)-(+)-modafinil)

Modafinil is a racemic mixture of two enantiomers, armodafinil ((R)-modafinil) and esmodafinil ((S)-modafinil).

=== Detection in body fluids ===
Modafinil and/or its major metabolite, modafinil acid, may be quantified in plasma, serum, or urine to monitor dosage in those receiving modafinil therapeutically, to confirm a diagnosis of poisoning in hospitalized patients, or to assist in the forensic investigation of a vehicular traffic violation. Instrumental techniques involving gas or liquid chromatography are usually employed for these purposes. In 2011, modafinil was not tested for by common drug screens (except for anti-doping screens) and is unlikely to cause false positives for other chemically unrelated drugs such as substituted amphetamines.

Reagent testing can screen for the presence of modafinil in samples.

=== Structural analogues ===
Many derivatives and structural analogs of modafinil have been synthesized. Examples include adrafinil, CE-123, fladrafinil (CRL-40941; fluorafinil), flmodafinil (CRL-40940; bisfluoromodafinil, lauflumide), RDS03-94, JJC8-088, modafiendz and modafinil sulfone.

== History ==
Modafinil was developed in France by neurophysiology professor Michel Jouvet and Lafon Laboratories in the 1970s. Modafinil is the primary metabolite of adrafinil, an earlier compound in the benzhydryl sulfinyl series. Modafinil has been prescribed in France since 1994 under the name Modiodal, and in the United States since 1998 as Provigil.

The US Food and Drug Administration approved modafinil in 1998 for narcolepsy treatment, and later for shift work sleep disorder and obstructive sleep apnea in 2003. It was approved in the UK in December 2002. In the United States, modafinil is marketed by Cephalon, a biopharmaceutical company acquired by Teva Pharmaceutical Industries in 2011, who acquired the rights from Lafon and purchased the company in 2001.

Cephalon introduced armodafinil, the (R)-enantiomer of modafinil, in the United States in 2007. Generic versions of modafinil became available in the US in 2012 after extensive patent litigation.

== Society and culture ==
Modafinil's use varies by region. In the US, it is approved for adult narcolepsy, shift work sleep disorder, and obstructive sleep apnea, but not for children. In the UK and the EU, since 2014, it is approved solely for narcolepsy, including in children (pediatric narcolepsy), with its use for other conditions restricted by the European Medicines Agency. Modafinil is not approved for use by children in multiple jurisdictions.

=== Legal status ===
Legal status of modafinil by country
Country	Legal status
Australia	Schedule 4 prescription-only medicine
Canada	Schedule F prescription drug; not a controlled substance under the Controlled Drugs and Substances Act; importing without permit may result in seizure
China	Class I psychotropic drug; prescription required; non-medical use prohibited
Denmark	Prescription drug; not a controlled substance; import without prescription illegal
Finland	Prescription drug; not a controlled substance; EU import restrictions apply
Japan	Schedule I psychotropic drug; prescription required; strict import controls
Mexico	Not a controlled substance; available without prescription
Moldova	Psychotropic drug; prescription only; importation illegal with severe penalties
Romania	Controlled substance; importation or sale is a felony (3-7 years); personal possession may result in fine
Russia	Schedule II controlled substance since 2012; not approved for medical use; possession can lead to 3-10 years imprisonment
South Africa	Schedule V substance; prescription required
Sweden	Schedule IV substance; prescription required; possession without prescription illegal
United Kingdom	Not listed in Misuse of Drugs Act; possession legal but prescription required
United States	Schedule IV controlled substance; prescription required; import requires DEA-registered importer; personal import limited to 50 doses with prescription

In 2008, Cephalon, the manufacturer of Provigil, pleaded guilty to a federal criminal charge related to its promotion of off-label uses of Provigil and two other drugs, paying $425 million in fines and settlements.

=== Brand names ===
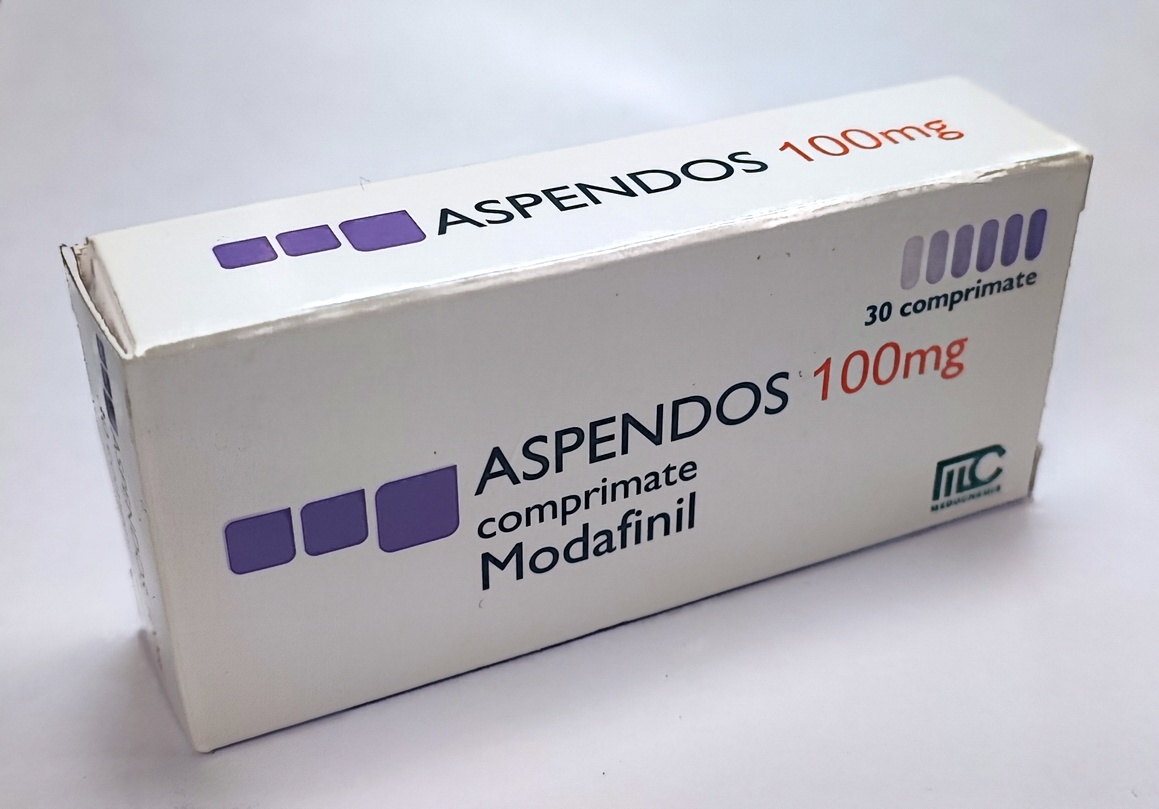
A generic formulation of modafinil marketed under the Aspendos brand name.

Modafinil is marketed under numerous brand names worldwide.

Selected brand names and markets
Brand name	Countries	Notes
Provigil	United States, United Kingdom, Ireland	Original brand by Cephalon
Alertec	Canada	Prescription drug (Schedule F)
Modiodal	France, Japan	Licensed to Mitsubishi Tanabe Pharma in Japan
Modalert	India and international	Manufactured by Sun Pharma
Modvigil	India and international	Manufactured by HAB Pharma
Vigil	Germany, Austria	Prescription required
Modasomil	Switzerland	Prescription required
Modiwake	Turkey	Prescription required
Stavigile	Brazil	Prescription required
Other names	Various countries	Alertex, Altasomil, Aspendos, Bravamax, Forcilin, Intensit, Karim, Mentix, Modafinilo, Modanil, Movigil, Resotyl, Vigia, Vigicer, Vigimax, Waklert, Zalux

=== Economics ===
Concerns have been raised about the growing use of modafinil as a "smart drug" or cognitive enhancer among healthy individuals who use it with the aim to improve concentration and memory. In 2003, modafinil sales rose sharply amid concern that it was being used as a stimulant by people seeking an extra edge. The cost of modafinil has decreased substantially since generic versions became available in the US in 2012; retail prices for generic modafinil (30 tablets of 200 mg) range approximately $20–45 with discount programs, compared to over $120 per month for brand-name Provigil in 2004.

Global sales figures for modafinil have not been publicly disclosed. Modafinil sold under the brand name Provigil accounted for over 40% of Cephalon's global turnover for several years, according to data published in 2020.

=== Patent protection and litigation ===
The original patent, U.S. patent 4,927,855, was granted to Laboratoire L. Lafon in 1990, covering the chemical compound of modafinil. This patent expired in 2010. In 1994, Cephalon filed a patent for modafinil in the form of particles of a defined size, represented by U.S. patent 5,618,845, which expired in 2015.

Following the nearing expiration of marketing rights in 2002, generic manufacturers, including Mylan and Teva, applied for US Food and Drug Administration approval to market a generic form of modafinil, leading to legal challenges by Cephalon regarding the particle size patent. The patent RE 37,516 was declared invalid and unenforceable in 2011.

In addition, Cephalon entered agreements with several generic drug manufacturers to delay the sale of generic modafinil in the US. These agreements were subject to legal scrutiny and antitrust investigations, culminating in a ruling by the Court of Appeals in 2016, which found that the settlements did not violate antitrust laws.

=== Social views ===
The use of modafinil as a supposed cognitive enhancer may be considered as cheating, unnatural, or risky. The University of Sussex explained that it is a prescription drug and the decision should be made by the doctor on whether to prescribe modafinil to a student. As a matter of bioethics, the US President's Council on Bioethics argued that excellence achieved through the use of drugs like modafinil is "cheap" as it obviates the need for hard work and study, and is not fully authentic because the excellence is partly attributable to the drug, not the individual. Alternately, people in Wall Street trading may consider it a tool for a competitive edge in a high-intensity environment. Due to such varying views, modafinil users for narcolepsy may cope with stigma by hiding, denying, or justifying their use, or by seeking support from others who share their views or experiences.

== Research ==
=== Psychiatric conditions ===
==== Major depressive disorder ====
Modafinil has been studied as an adjunctive treatment for major depressive disorder. While some individual trials have reported benefits, systematic reviews and meta-analyses have found the evidence limited, the quality of evidence low, and the results inconclusive; modafinil did not significantly improve depression in network meta-analysis, though there was some evidence for reduced fatigue and sleepiness.

==== Substance dependence ====
Modafinil has been studied as a potential treatment for stimulant dependence and cocaine addiction, but clinical trials have failed to show that it helps reduce drug use or maintain abstinence; 2024 reviews found it ineffective for amphetamine-type stimulant use disorder, methamphetamine use disorder, and cocaine dependence.

==== Schizophrenia ====
Modafinil and armodafinil were studied as a complement to antipsychotic medications in the treatment of schizophrenia. They showed no effect on positive symptoms or cognitive performance. A 2015 meta-analysis found that modafinil and armodafinil may slightly reduce negative symptoms in people with acute schizophrenia, though they do not appear useful for people with stable schizophrenia who have prominent negative symptoms (such as reduced motivation or social withdrawal). Among medications demonstrated to be effective for reducing negative symptoms in combination with antipsychotics, modafinil, and armodafinil are among the smallest effect sizes.

==== Motivational disorders ====
In animal studies, modafinil has been found to reverse tetrabenazine-induced motivational deficits, suggesting potential pro-motivational effects. Novel modafinil analogs are being developed as potential treatments for motivational disorders in humans.

=== Cognitive enhancement ===
Systematic reviews have found limited evidence for modafinil as a cognitive enhancer in healthy, non-sleep-deprived individuals. A 2019 review found small enhancements in attention, executive functions, and learning, but impairments in divergent creative thinking in some studies. A 2020 review reported only a modest effect on memory updating, concluding there is insufficient evidence to support the perception that modafinil is a useful cognitive enhancer.

=== Postural orthostatic tachycardia syndrome ===
Modafinil has been studied and used in the treatment of postural orthostatic tachycardia syndrome (POTS).

=== Other conditions ===
Modafinil has been investigated for several other conditions with inconclusive or preliminary results. Preliminary research is examining modafinil for excessive daytime sleepiness in myotonic dystrophy, though it is not approved for this use and results are debated. Modafinil has also been studied for disorders of consciousness, but observational reports have produced mixed results.
