= Modafinil acid =

Names
- Preferred IUPAC name (Diphenylmethanesulfinyl)acetic acid
- Other names Modafinilic acid; Modafinil carboxylate; CRL-40467

Identifiers
CAS Number	63547-24-0
3D model (JSmol)	Interactive image
ChemSpider	2342211
ECHA InfoCard	100.219.633
PubChem CID	3085267
UNII	54N37HN7N4
CompTox Dashboard (EPA)	DTXSID60979768
- InChI: InChI=1S/C15H14O3S/c16-14(17)11-19(18)15(12-7-3-1-4-8-12)13-9-5-2-6-10-13/h1-10,15H,11H2,(H,16,17) Key: QARQPIWTMBRJFX-UHFFFAOYSA-N
- SMILES: C1=CC=C(C=C1)C(C2=CC=CC=C2)S(=O)CC(=O)O

Properties
Chemical formula	C_{15}H_{14}O_{3}S
Molar mass	274.33 g·mol^{−1}
- Except where otherwise noted, data are given for materials in their standard state (at 25 °C [77 °F], 100 kPa). Infobox references

Modafinil acid (code name CRL-40467), also known as modafinilic acid or modafinil carboxylate, is one of the two major metabolites of modafinil – the other being modafinil sulfone. Modafinil acid is also a metabolite of the modafinil prodrug, adrafinil, and the (R)-(–)-enantiomer is a metabolite of armodafinil, the (R)-(–)-enantiomer of modafinil. Between 30 - 60% of modafinil is converted to modafinil acid and its half life is roughly half that of modafinil (about 7 hours). Modafinil acid seems to be inactive, and similarly to modafinil sulfone, does not appear to contribute to the wakefulness-promoting/psychostimulant effects of modafinil.

In the breakdown process of modafinil, modafinil is primarily hydrolyzed by an esterase or amidase enzyme into modafinil acid. The apparent clearance of modafinil acid is significantly higher than that of modafinil, following the hypothesis that metabolism increases the polarity and the clearance of modafinil.

== See also ==
- List of modafinil analogues and derivatives
