= Armodafinil =

Wakefulness-promoting medication

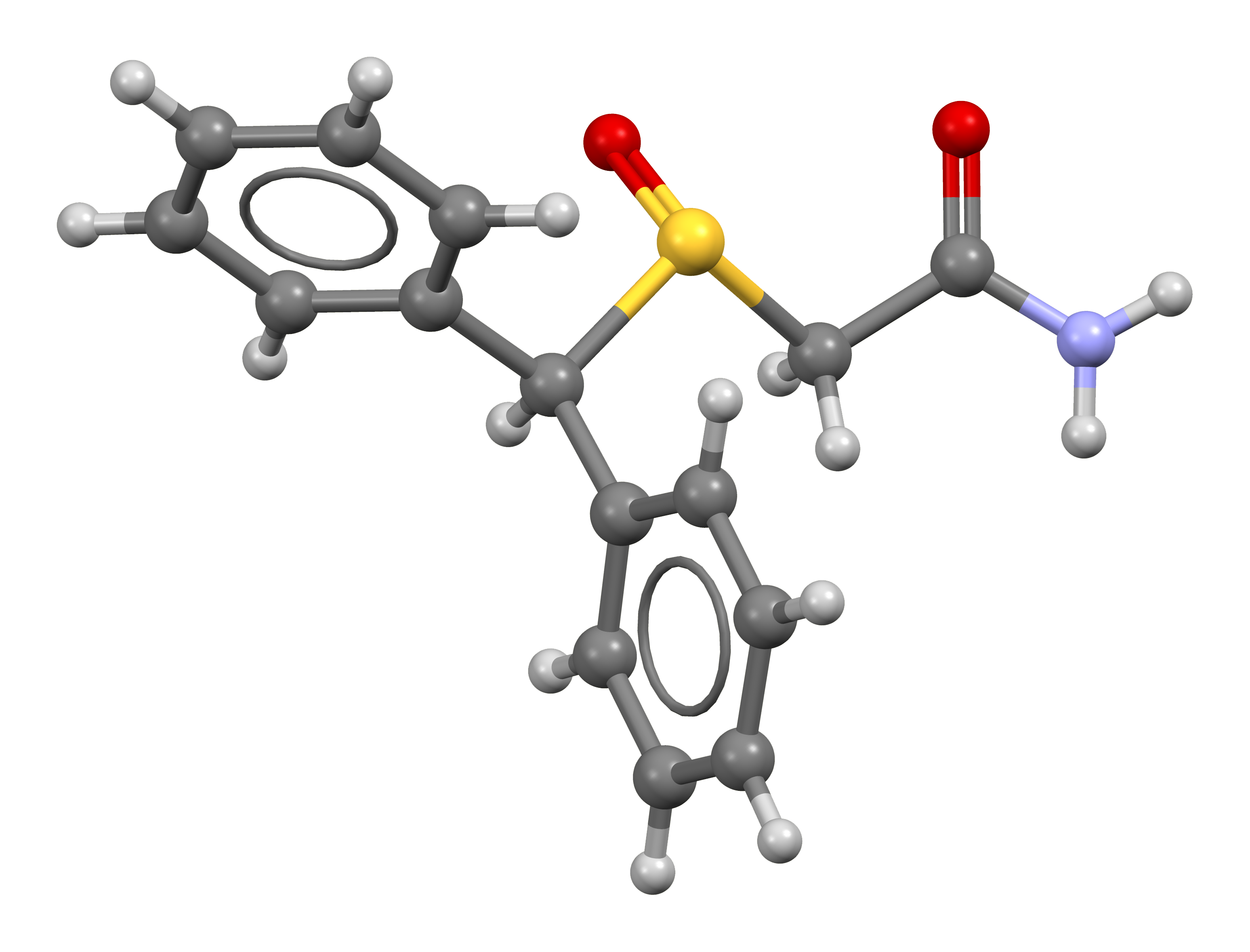

Clinical data
- Trade names: Nuvigil, others
- Other names: (R)-Modafinil; R-Modafinil; (R)-(–)-Modafinil; (–)-Modafinil; CRL-40982; CEP-10952
- AHFS/Drugs.com: Monograph
- MedlinePlus: a602016
- Pregnancy category: C
- Dependence liability: Low
- Routes of administration: Oral (tablets)
- Drug class: Atypical dopamine reuptake inhibitor; wakefulness-promoting agent
- ATC code: N06BA13 (WHO)

Legal status
- Legal status: AU: S4 (Prescription only); BR: Class B1 (Psychoactive drugs); US: Schedule IV

Pharmacokinetic data
- Bioavailability: Unknown (due to poor aqueous solubility; but modafinil is 40–65% based on urinary excretion)
- Protein binding: Unknown (but for modafinil is moderate, primarily to albumin)
- Metabolism: Liver, including CYP3A4 and other enzymes (hydrolytic amidation, sulfoxidation, aromatic ring hydroxylation, and glucuronide conjugation)
- Metabolites: • Armodafinil acid • Modafinil sulfone
- Onset of action: 1.5–6.5 h (range 0.5–11 h) (peak)
- Elimination half-life: 10–17 hours
- Duration of action: Up to 13.5 hours
- Excretion: Unknown (but modafinil is excreted 80% in urine and 1.0% in feces)

Identifiers
- IUPAC name: (–)-2-[(R)-(diphenylmethyl)sulfinyl]acetamide
- CAS Number: 112111-43-0
- PubChem CID: 9690109
- IUPHAR/BPS: 7555
- DrugBank: DB06413
- ChemSpider: 7962943
- UNII: V63XWA605I
- KEGG: D03215
- ChEBI: CHEBI:77590
- ChEMBL: ChEMBL1201192
- CompTox Dashboard (EPA): DTXSID90920667
- ECHA InfoCard: 100.207.833

Chemical and physical data
- Formula: C_{15}H_{15}NO_{2}S
- Molar mass: 273.35 g·mol^{−1}
- 3D model (JSmol): Interactive image
- SMILES: C1=CC=C(C=C1)C(C2=CC=CC=C2)[S@](=O)CC(=O)N
- InChI: InChI=1S/C15H15NO2S/c16-14(17)11-19(18)15(12-7-3-1-4-8-12)13-9-5-2-6-10-13/h1-10,15H,11H2,(H2,16,17)/t19-/m1/s1; Key:YFGHCGITMMYXAQ-LJQANCHMSA-N

Armodafinil, sold under the brand name Nuvigil, is a wakefulness-promoting medication that is used to treat excessive daytime sleepiness associated with obstructive sleep apnea, narcolepsy, and shift work disorder. It is also used off-label for certain other indications. The drug is taken by mouth.

Side effects of armodafinil include headache, nausea, dizziness, and insomnia. Armodafinil acts as a selective atypical dopamine reuptake inhibitor (DRI) and hence as an indirect dopamine receptor agonist. Nonetheless, other mechanisms might also be involved in its effects. Chemically, armodafinil is the enantiopure (R)-(–)-enantiomer of the racemic mixture modafinil (brand name Provigil). Both enantiomers of modafinil are active as DRIs and wakefulness-promoting agents, but armodafinil is more potent and has a much longer half-life and duration.

Armodafinil is produced by the pharmaceutical company Cephalon and was approved by the United States Food and Drug Administration (FDA) in 2007. In 2016, the FDA granted Mylan rights for the first generic version of armodafinil to be marketed in the United States.

== Medical uses ==
Armodafinil is currently FDA-approved to treat excessive daytime sleepiness (EDS) associated with obstructive sleep apnea (OSA), narcolepsy, and shift work sleep disorder (SWSD). It is commonly used off-label to treat attention deficit hyperactivity disorder (ADHD), chronic fatigue syndrome (CFS), and major depressive disorder (MDD), and has been repurposed as an adjunctive treatment for bipolar disorder. It has been shown to improve vigilance in air traffic controllers; in the United States, however, wakefulness-promoting medications such as modafinil (Provigil) and armodafinil (Nuvigil) are not approved by the Federal Aviation Administration (FAA) for civilian controllers or pilots.

=== Psychiatry ===
==== Bipolar disorder ====
Armodafinil, along with racemic modafinil, has been repurposed as an adjunctive treatment for acute depression in people with bipolar disorder. Meta-analytic evidence showed that add-on modafinil and armodafinil were more effective than placebo on response to treatment, clinical remission, and reduction in depressive symptoms, with only minor side effects, but the effect sizes are small and the quality of evidence has to be considered low, limiting the clinical relevance of current evidence. Current dosage for bipolar disorder is 150 mg once daily. Paradoxical tiredness and sleeping is observed in some cases.

==== Schizophrenia ====
In June 2010, it was revealed that a phase II study of armodafinil as an adjunctive therapy in adults with schizophrenia had failed to meet the primary endpoints, and the clinical program was subsequently terminated. By contrast, a study published later that year showed that patients with schizophrenia treated with armodafinil showed fewer of the negative symptoms of schizophrenia.

==== Jet lag ====
On March 30, 2010, the FDA declined to approve use of Nuvigil to treat jet lag.

==== Attention deficit hyperactivity disorder ====
A 2024 review by Mexican researchers brought up the potential utility of armodafinil as a treatment of ADHD based upon its known effects and similarity to modafinil, however it is still not considered a mainline treatment. Like modafinil, it is sometimes used off-label for ADHD treatment.

=== Available forms ===
Armodafinil is available in the form of 50, 150, 200, and 250 mg oral tablets. A 50 mg dose of armodafinil has been said to be essentially equivalent to a 100 mg dose of modafinil in terms of drug levels.

== Adverse effects ==
In placebo-controlled studies, the most commonly observed side effects were headache, xerostomia (dry mouth), nausea, dizziness, and insomnia. Possible side effects also include depression, anxiety, hallucinations, euphoria, extreme increase in activity and talking, anorexia, tremor, thirst, rash, suicidal thoughts, and aggression. Symptoms of an overdose on armodafinil include trouble sleeping, restlessness, confusion, disorientation, feeling excited, mania, hallucinations, nausea, diarrhea, severely increased or decreased heart beat, chest pain, and increased blood pressure. Serious rashes can develop in rare cases, and require immediate medical attention due to the possibility of Stevens–Johnson syndrome, or other hypersensitivities to armodafinil.

=== Misuse potential ===
Armodafinil has a low misuse potential similar to modafinil.

== Interactions ==
Hypertensive crises have been reported when armodafinil has been taken with monoamine oxidase inhibitors (MAOIs) like tranylcypromine.

== Pharmacology ==
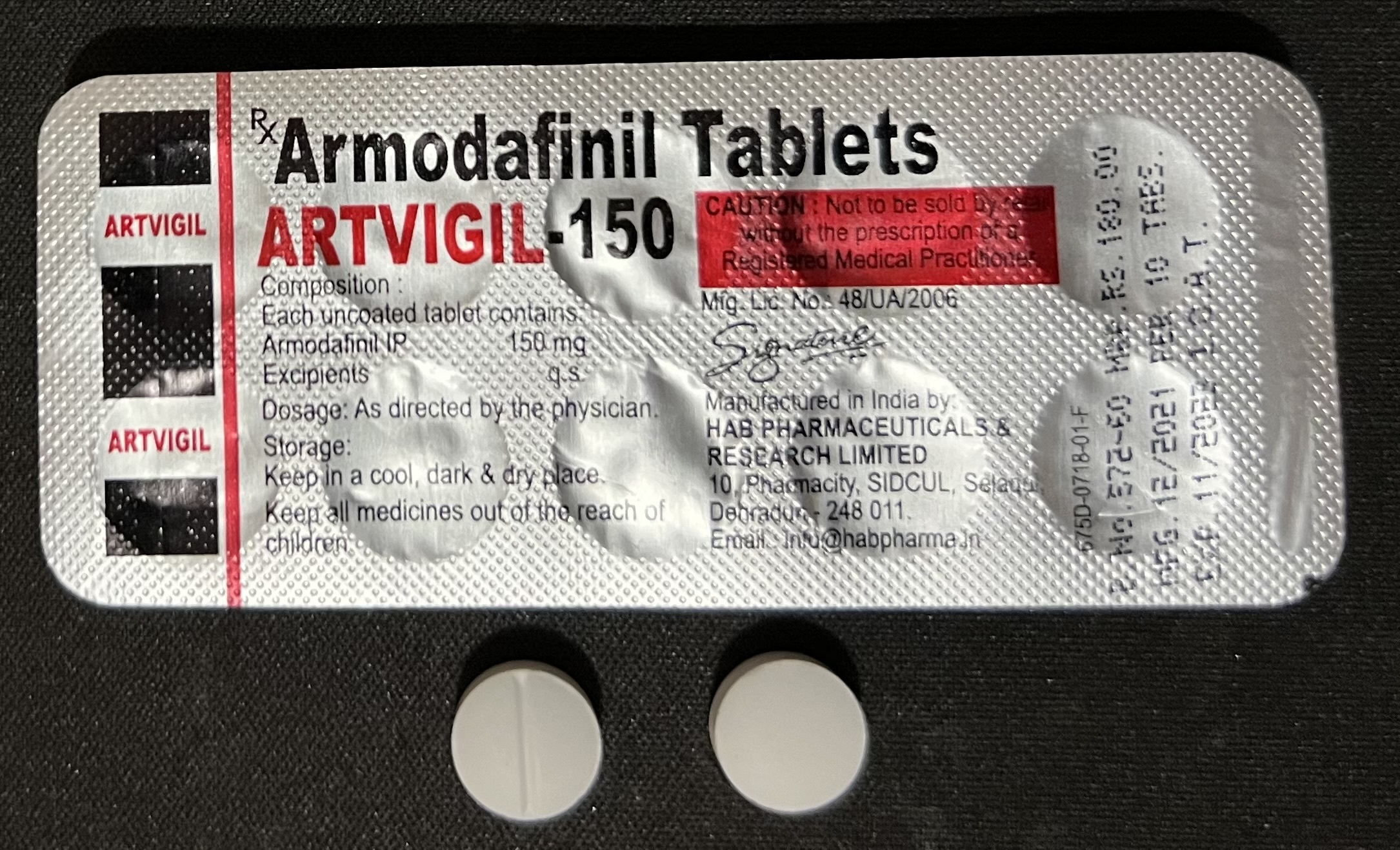
Armodafinil 150mg blister

=== Pharmacodynamics ===
The mechanism of action of armodafinil is not fully known. It has wake-promoting actions similar to sympathomimetic agents including amphetamine and methylphenidate, although its pharmacologic profile is not identical to that of the sympathomimetic amines. Armodafinil binds in vitro to the dopamine transporter (DAT) and inhibits dopamine reuptake. For modafinil, this activity has been associated in vivo with increased extracellular dopamine levels. In genetically engineered mice lacking the DAT, modafinil lacked wake-promoting activity, suggesting that this activity was DAT-dependent. The wake-promoting effects of modafinil, unlike those of amphetamine, were not antagonized by the dopamine receptor antagonist haloperidol in rats. In addition, α-methyl-p-tyrosine (AMPT), a dopamine synthesis inhibitor, blocks the action of amphetamine but does not block locomotor activity induced by modafinil.

In addition to its wake-promoting effects and ability to increase locomotor activity in animals, according to Nuvigil prescribing information from manufacturer Cephalon, armodafinil produces psychoactive and euphoric effects, alterations in mood, perception, thinking, and feelings typical of other central nervous system (CNS) stimulants in humans. Armodafinil, like racemic modafinil, may also possess reinforcing properties, as evidenced by its self-administration in monkeys previously trained to administer cocaine; armodafinil was also partially discriminated as stimulant-like. A Cephalon-founded study in which patients were administered modafinil, methylphenidate, and a placebo found that modafinil produces "psychoactive and euphoric effects and feelings consistent with [methylphenidate]."

Armodafinil (R-(−)-modafinil) has pharmacological properties almost identical to those of modafinil, a mixture of armodafinil and esmodafinil ((S)-(+)-modafinil). The (R)- and (S)-enantiomers have similar pharmacological action in animals. In humans however, armodafinil has a lower therapeutic dose range than modafinil, suggesting greater clinical potency, and also has a longer duration.

Like modafinil, armodafinil is an inhibitor and/or inducer of certain cytochrome P450 enzymes. It moderately induces CYP3A4 and moderately inhibits CYP2C19. In contrast to modafinil, however, armodafinil does not induce CYP1A2.

=== Pharmacokinetics ===
==== Absorption ====
Armodafinil is rapidly absorbed with oral administration. The oral bioavailability of armodafinil is not known as the drug is water-insoluble and hence cannot be administered intravenously for comparison studies. In any case, the bioavailability of modafinil is estimated to be between 45% and 65% based on excretion studies. The time to peak levels of armodafinil when fasted has been reported be median 1.5 to 2 hours (range 0.5–6 hours). In one study however, the time to peak levels was median 6.5 hours (range 3–11 hours). Taking armodafinil with food does not affect its overall bioavailability but has been found to delay time to peak levels by 2 to 4 hours. As a result, food may affect the onset and duration of armodafinil.

Armodafinil shows linear or dose-proportional pharmacokinetics over a dose range of 50 to 400 mg orally. Steady state levels are reached within 3 to 7 days of once-daily continuous administration. Steady-state levels of armodafinil are 1.8-fold higher than after a single dose. No time-dependent changes in armodafinil's pharmacokinetics have been observed over 12 weeks of administration.

Modafinil and armodafinil show similar peak levels and times to peak levels in directly comparative studies. Due to armodafinil having a longer elimination half-life than esmodafinil however, armodafinil constitutes 90% of modafinil levels at steady state with modafinil therapy.

==== Distribution ====
The apparent volume of distribution of armodafinil is approximately 42 L or 0.5 to 0.8 L/kg body weight. Data on the plasma protein binding of armodafinil are not available, but modafinil is known to be 60% bound to plasma proteins, with it being bound primarily to albumin. Both armodafinil and esmodafinil are known to be P-glycoprotein substrates, but the clinical significance of this is unknown.

==== Metabolism ====
The metabolism of armodafinil is via hydrolytic deamidation, S-oxidation, and aromatic ring hydroxylation. Subsequently, its hydroxylated metabolites undergo conjugation via glucuronidation. The major metabolic pathway is amide hydrolysis into armodafinil acid, with the second most major pathway being sulfone formation into modafinil sulfone. The sulfonation of armodafinil is catalyzed by the cytochrome P450 enzymes CYP3A4 and CYP3A5, whereas hydroxylation is mediated by CYP2C9. Two armodafinil metabolites, armodafinil acid and modafinil sulfone, reach appreciable concentrations in the circulation. Both of these metabolites have been said to be pharmacologically inactive. However, modafinil sulfone is known to produce anticonvulsant effects in animals, a property that it shares with modafinil.

==== Elimination ====
More appears to be known about the elimination of modafinil than armodafinil. Modafinil is eliminated mainly via metabolism (90%), with less than 10% of a dose being excreted unchanged in urine. Modafinil, given as a single dose in radiolabeled form, is excreted 80% in urine and 1% in feces by 11 days post-administration. Urinary recovery as the major metabolite modafinil acid has been found to be 35 to 51% of a dose.

The apparent terminal elimination half-life of armodafinil is approximately 15 hours, with a range of 10 to 17 hours in different studies. Its oral clearance at steady state is approximately 33 mL/min.

The individual enantiomers of modafinil, armodafinil and esmodafinil, have substantially different pharmacokinetics due to differing elimination profiles. Both armodafinil and esmodafinil are eliminated in a monophasic manner. However, armodafinil has a half-life of 10 to 17 hours, while esmodafinil has a half-life of 3 to 5 hours (3–4 times shorter). Consequently, modafinil, a racemic mixture (1:1) of armodafinil and esmodafinil, has a biphasic elimination profile, with esmodafinil being eliminated much more rapidly than armodafinil. Armodafinil and modafinil have shown virtually identical elimination half-lives of approximately 12 to 16 hours in directly comparative studies. However, due to the biphasic elimination profile of modafinil, armodafinil shows higher levels than modafinil from 4 to 6 hours after administration and about 40% higher area-under-the-curve (AUC) levels than modafinil. Moreover, armodafinil showed 42% lower peak-to-trough variation than modafinil with once-daily administration at steady state. Because of the preceding, armodafinil has a longer duration and more stable levels than modafinil.

== Chemistry ==
Armodafinil, or (R)-(–)-modafinil, is the enantiopure (R)-(–)-enantiomer of the racemic mixture modafinil, while esmodafinil is the (S)-(+)-enantiomer.

=== Synthesis ===
The chemical synthesis of armodafinil has been described.

=== Analogues ===
A number of analogues of armodafinil are known, including adrafinil, flmodafinil, fladrafinil, and others.

== History ==
Adrafinil was discovered by the pharmaceutical company Lafon in France in 1974. Subsequently, it was found that adrafinil is a prodrug of modafinil in 1976. Modafinil was then patented in 1979. Adrafinil was introduced for medical use in France in 1981. It was registered for medical use in France in 1992 and became available in 1994. Cephalin leased the rights for modafinil in the United States in 1993 and eventually purchased Lafon in 2001. Modafinil was approved for medical use in the United States in 1998.

Armodafinil was patented in 1987. It was introduced for medical use in the United States in 2007. Teva Pharmaceuticals took over Cephalon and all of its products, including modafinil and armodafinil, in 2011.

Modafinil was originally thought to act as an α_{1}-adrenergic receptor agonist, but this hypothesis was later found to be incorrect. Subsequently, modafinil was identified as an atypical dopamine reuptake inhibitor (DRI). Modafinil and armodafinil were respectively shown to occupy the dopamine transporter (DAT) and increase brain dopamine levels at clinical therapeutic doses in humans in 2009 and 2010, which is said to have put an end to the debate about their mechanism of action, though not excluding the possibility of other actions also being involved in its effects.

== Society and culture ==
=== Brand names ===
Armodafinil is sold under a wide variety of brand names worldwide:

- Acronite (by Consern Pharma): India
- Armoda: ACI Pharmaceuticals (Symbiota), Bangladesh
- Armod: India (by Emcure Pharmaceuticals Ltd)
- Artvigil: India (by HAB Pharma)
- Neoresotyl: Chile, Colombia
- Nuvigil: USA, Chile, Ukraine, Israel, Mexico, Australia
- R-Modawake: India
- Waklert: India (by Sun Pharma)
- Modavital: El Salvador (Farmaceutica INHOSPI (by Laboratorios Marceli)
- Nodement: Syrian Arab republic (by hama pharma)
- Armowake: Egypt (by EVA Pharma)

=== Legal status ===
In Australia and the United States, Armodafinil is considered to be a Schedule 4 prescription-only medicine or prescription animal remedy. Schedule 4 is defined as "Substances, the use or supply of which should be by or on the order of persons permitted by State or Territory legislation to prescribe and should be available from a pharmacist on prescription."

==== Romania ====
As of 2021, new laws do not directly include Armodafinil as a doping agent, but they do include Modafinil, as Armodafinil is an enantiomer of Modafinil it will show up on lab tests, but it can be debated if it is or not the same substance.

New laws state that simple possession is not a criminal offence and is punished with a fine and confiscation. Importing into Romania and exporting from Romania of the substance, without a valid medical prescription, is a criminal offence and is punished with jail time between two and seven years.

== Research ==
Besides hypersomnia, armodafinil was under development for the treatment of fatigue, bipolar depression, and schizophrenia. Nonetheless, development for these indications was discontinued. The drug reached phase 3 clinical trials for treatment of fatigue prior to the discontinuation of its development for this use in January 2024. Aside from the preceding indications, armodafinil is currently under development for the treatment of eating disorders and, as of January 2024, is in phase 3 trials for this use.
