= Flmodafinil =

Wakefulness-promoting drug/Dopamine reuptake inhibitor

Clinical data
- Other names: CRL-40,941; CRL-40941; NLS-4; JBG01-41; JBG1-41; JBG1-041; Bisfluoromodafinil; Lauflumide; JBG1-048/JBG1-049; JBG01-048/JBG01-049
- Drug class: Dopamine reuptake inhibitor; Wakefulness-promoting agent
- ATC code: None

Identifiers
- IUPAC name: (2-Amino-2-oxoethyl)[bis(4-fluorophenyl)methyl]sulfoniumolate
- CAS Number: 90280-13-0
- PubChem CID: 13271852
- ChemSpider: 26386803
- UNII: 174R2IG4T0
- CompTox Dashboard (EPA): DTXSID00533646

Chemical and physical data
- Formula: C_{15}H_{13}F_{2}NO_{2}S
- Molar mass: 309.33 g·mol^{−1}
- 3D model (JSmol): Interactive image
- SMILES: C1=CC(=CC=C1C(C2=CC=C(C=C2)F)S(=O)CC(=O)N)F
- InChI: InChI=1S/C15H13F2NO2S/c16-12-5-1-10(2-6-12)15(21(20)9-14(18)19)11-3-7-13(17)8-4-11/h1-8,15H,9H2,(H2,18,19); Key:YEAQNUMCWMRYMU-UHFFFAOYSA-N

Flmodafinil (developmental code names CRL-40,940, NLS-4, JBG01-41), also known as bisfluoromodafinil and lauflumide, is a wakefulness-promoting agent related to modafinil which has been developed for treatment of a variety of different medical conditions. These include chronic fatigue syndrome, idiopathic hypersomnia, narcolepsy, attention deficit hyperactivity disorder (ADHD), and Alzheimer's disease. Aside from its development as a potential pharmaceutical drug, flmodafinil is sold online and used non-medically as a nootropic (cognitive enhancer).

The drug has been found to act as a selective atypical dopamine reuptake inhibitor. It produces wakefulness-promoting effects in animals. Unlike modafinil, flmodafinil does not induce cytochrome P450 enzymes. Chemically, flmodafinil is an enantiopure derivative of modafinil and is also known as bisfluoromodafinil (it is the (R)-bis(4-fluoro) phenyl ring-substituted derivative of modafinil).

Flmodafinil was developed by NLS Pharma. As of January 2024, it is in preclinical development for treatment of chronic fatigue syndrome. No recent development has been reported for idiopathic hypersomnia and development has been discontinued for narcolepsy, ADHD, and Alzheimer's disease.

== Pharmacology ==
=== Pharmacodynamics ===
Flmodafinil is a selective dopamine reuptake inhibitor (DRI). Its affinity (K_{i}) for the DAT is 4,090 nM. At the serotonin transporter (SERT), its affinity (K_{i}) was 48,700 nM (12-fold lower than for the DAT), and it had negligible affinity for the sigma σ_{1} receptor (K_{i} > 100,000 nM). The drug has been found to block the dopamine transporter (DAT) by 83%, to a greater extent than methylphenidate without unfavorable concomitant adrenergic effects. The drug is an atypical DRI similarly to modafinil.

The affinities for the DAT of flmodafinil's enantiomers and modafinil have also been studied. The affinities (K_{i}) were 5,480 nM for armodafinil ((R)-modafinil), 2,970 nM for (S)-(+)-flmodafinil (JBG1-048), and 4,830 nM for (R)-(–)-flmodafinil (JBG1-049). Their affinities for the SERT and σ_{1} receptor have also been reported. Similarly to modafinil, (S)-(+)-flmodafinil and (R)-(–)-flmodafinil increase dopamine levels in the nucleus accumbens in animals. They have been found to increase dopamine levels by up to 150 to 200% of baseline at the highest assessed dose. These increases are much smaller than those elicited by amphetamine or cocaine.

In a study comparing the wake-promoting effects of flmodafinil and modafinil, flmodafinil was found to maintain wakefulness over a significantly longer timeframe than modafinil. While the administration of neither compound resulted in sleep rebound, flmodafinil perturbed sleep architecture to a lesser degree than modafinil. This difference was characterised by an attenuated EEG power density within slow frequencies (<4 Hz) following flmodafinil treatment, though both compounds increased power density relative to placebo.

In contrast to modafinil, flmodafinil is not an inducer of the cytochrome P450 CYP3A4 or CYP3A5 enzymes.

=== Pharmacokinetics ===
The pharmacokinetics of flmodafinil are being studied.

== Chemistry ==
Flmodafinil is a racemic mixture of (S)-(+)- and (R)-(–)-enantiomers. The (S)-(+) enantiomer has been referred to as JBG1-048 and the (R)-(–) enantiomer has been referred to as JBG1-049.

=== Analogues ===
Analogues of flmodafinil include modafinil, armodafinil ((R)-modafinil), esmodafinil ((S)-modafinil), adrafinil (CRL-40,028; N-hydroxymodafinil), fladrafinil (CRL-40,941; bisfluoroadrafinil), and CE-123, among others.

== History ==
Flmodafinil was patented in 2013, and preclinical research has been underway since December 2015. It appears to have first been patented in the 1980s.

== See also ==
- List of investigational narcolepsy and hypersomnia drugs
