= Fladrafinil =

Wakefulness-promoting drug

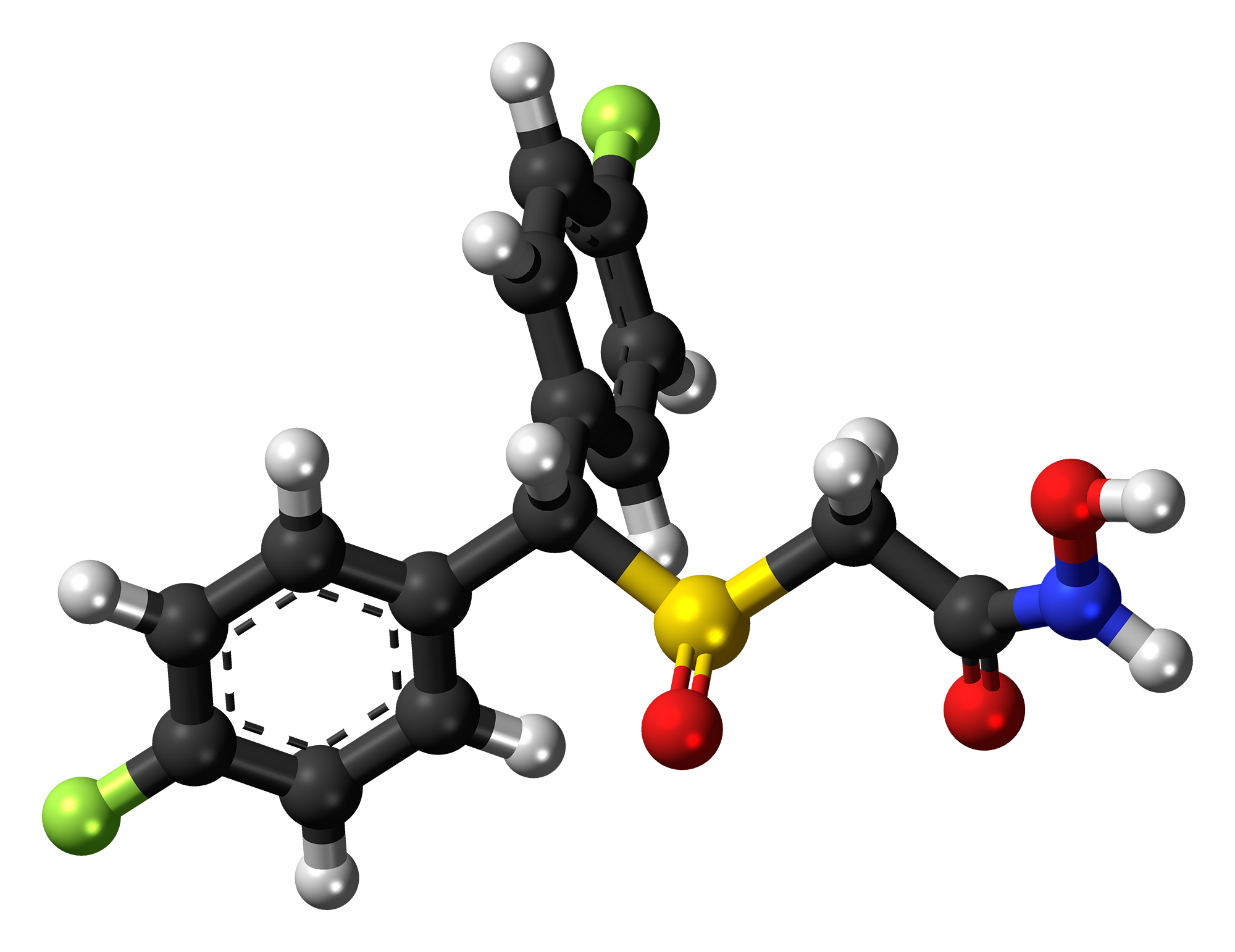

Clinical data
- Other names: CRL-40,941; Fluorafinil; Bisfluoroadrafinil
- Routes of administration: By mouth
- ATC code: None

Legal status
- Legal status: US: Not approved

Identifiers
- IUPAC name: 2-{[Bis(4-fluorophenyl)methyl]sulfinyl}-N-hydroxyacetamide
- CAS Number: 90212-80-9
- PubChem CID: 13316557
- ChemSpider: 29785194
- UNII: 5RT6X0M01F
- CompTox Dashboard (EPA): DTXSID40536590

Chemical and physical data
- Formula: C_{15}H_{13}F_{2}NO_{3}S
- Molar mass: 325.33 g·mol^{−1}
- 3D model (JSmol): Interactive image
- SMILES: C1=CC(=CC=C1C(C2=CC=C(C=C2)F)S(=O)CC(=O)NO)F
- InChI: InChI=1S/C15H13F2NO3S/c16-12-5-1-10(2-6-12)15(22(21)9-14(19)18-20)11-3-7-13(17)8-4-11/h1-8,15,20H,9H2,(H,18,19); Key:VKGUUSVYPXTWMA-UHFFFAOYSA-N

Fladrafinil (developmental code name CRL-40,941), also known as fluorafinil or as bisfluoroadrafinil, is a wakefulness-promoting agent related to modafinil that was never marketed. It is sold online and used non-medically as a nootropic (cognitive enhancer).

Modafinil and its analogues are known to act as dopamine reuptake inhibitors and this is thought to be involved in their wakefulness-promoting effects. Chemically, fladrafinil is a derivative of adrafinil (N-hydroxymodafinil) and is also known as bisfluoroadrafinil (it is the bis(4-fluoro) phenyl ring-substituted derivative of adrafinil). It is closely related to flmodafinil (CRL-40,940; bisfluoromodafinil).

== Pharmacology ==
=== Pharmacodynamics ===
Fladrafinil has been found to produce antiaggressive effects in animals, which adrafinil does not produce. Fladrafinil is purportedly 3 to 4 times more potent than adrafinil in this action.

== Chemistry ==
=== Analogues ===
Analogues of fladrafinil include modafinil, armodafinil ((R)-modafinil), esmodafinil ((S)-modafinil), adrafinil (CRL-40,028; N-hydroxymodafinil), flmodafinil (CRL-40,940; bisfluoromodafinil), and CE-123, among others.

== History ==
Fladrafinil appears to have first been patented in the 1980s.

== Research ==
The pharmacokinetics of fladrafinil are being studied.
