= Esmodafinil =

Unmarketed enantiomer of modafinil

- (S)-(+)-Modafinil

Clinical data
- Other names: CRL-40983; (S)-Modafinil; S-Modafinil; (S)-(+)-Modafinil; (+)-Modafinil; NH-02D
- Drug class: Atypical dopamine reuptake inhibitor; wakefulness-promoting agent

Pharmacokinetic data
- Elimination half-life: 3–5 hours

Identifiers
- IUPAC name: 2-[(S)-benzhydrylsulfinyl]acetamide
- CAS Number: 112111-47-4
- PubChem CID: 11173366
- ChemSpider: 9348458
- UNII: 152JRG3T0U
- ChEBI: CHEBI:77591
- ChEMBL: ChEMBL1672355
- CompTox Dashboard (EPA): DTXSID70457709
- ECHA InfoCard: 100.234.492

Chemical and physical data
- Formula: C_{15}H_{15}NO_{2}S
- Molar mass: 273.35 g·mol^{−1}
- 3D model (JSmol): Interactive image
- SMILES: C1=CC=C(C=C1)C(C2=CC=CC=C2)[S@@](=O)CC(=O)N
- InChI: InChI=1S/C15H15NO2S/c16-14(17)11-19(18)15(12-7-3-1-4-8-12)13-9-5-2-6-10-13/h1-10,15H,11H2,(H2,16,17)/t19-/m0/s1; Key:YFGHCGITMMYXAQ-IBGZPJMESA-N

Esmodafinil (also known as (S)-modafinil or (+)-modafinil; developmental code name CRL-40983) is the enantiopure (S)-(+)-enantiomer of modafinil. Unlike armodafinil ((R)-(−)-modafinil), esmodafinil has never been marketed on its own.

Esmodafinil is suspected to be less clinically useful for treating conditions that modafinil and armodafinil are marketed for, such as narcolepsy, shift work sleep disorder, and obstructive sleep apnea.

== Pharmacology ==
=== Pharmacodynamics ===
Esmodafinil has about 3-fold lower affinity for the dopamine transporter (DAT) compared to armodafinil or modafinil (K_{i} = 780 nM, 2,500 nM, and 2,300 nM, respectively). It showed about 2-fold lower potency than armodafinil and about 1.5-fold higher potency than modafinil as a dopamine reuptake inhibitor (DRI) in vitro (IC_{50} = 8,700 nM, 4,000 nM, and 13,000 nM, respectively). Both enantiomers of modafinil preferentially bind to the DAT in an inward facing conformation that is associated with atypical DRI profiles. Esmodafinil was about 1.4- to 1.5-fold more potent than modafinil or armodafinil in substituting for cocaine in rodents. Esmodafinil and armodafinil have been said to have approximately equipotent pharmacological effects but differing pharmacokinetics.

Esmodafinil has been researched for the treatment of cocaine addiction. Like armodafinil, esmodafinil attenuates the effects of cocaine by occupying the dopamine transporter. While doing so, esmodafinil increases dopamine levels in the nucleus accumbens to a lesser extent than cocaine. However, the short elimination half-life of esmodafinil has been cited as reason to investigate armodafinil as a cocaine addiction treatment instead.

=== Pharmacokinetics ===
Esmodafinil possesses a substantially shorter elimination half-life (3–5 hours) compared to armodafinil (10–17 hours) or modafinil (12–15 hours).

== Chemistry ==
Esmodafinil, or (S)-(+)-modafinil, is the enantiopure (S)-(+)-enantiomer of the racemic mixture modafinil, while armodafinil is the (R)-(−)-enantiomer.

=== Analogues ===
A number of analogues of esmodafinil are known, including adrafinil, flmodafinil, fladrafinil, and others.

=== Detection ===
Modafinil is considered a stimulant doping agent and as such is prohibited by World Anti-Doping Agency in sports competitions. Modafinil enantiomers can be separately quantified in biological samples.
