= Modafinil sulfone =

Names
- Preferred IUPAC name 2-(Diphenylmethanesulfonyl)acetamide
- Other names CRL-41056; Diphenylmethylsulfonylacetamide

Identifiers
CAS Number	118779-53-6
3D model (JSmol)	Interactive image
ChemSpider	4962374
PubChem CID	6460146
UNII	946LME1J4S
CompTox Dashboard (EPA)	DTXSID10424213
- InChI: InChI=1S/C15H15NO3S/c16-14(17)11-20(18,19)15(12-7-3-1-4-8-12)13-9-5-2-6-10-13/h1-10,15H,11H2,(H2,16,17) Key: ZESNOWZYHYRSRY-UHFFFAOYSA-N
- SMILES: C1=CC=C(C=C1)C(C2=CC=CC=C2)S(=O)(=O)CC(=O)N

Properties
Chemical formula	C_{15}H_{15}NO_{3}S
Molar mass	289.35 g·mol^{−1}
- Except where otherwise noted, data are given for materials in their standard state (at 25 °C [77 °F], 100 kPa). Infobox references

Modafinil sulfone (code name CRL-41056) is an achiral, oxidized metabolite of modafinil, a wakefulness-promoting agent. It is one of two major circulating metabolites of modafinil, the other being modafinil acid. Modafinil sulfone is also a metabolite of the modafinil prodrug, adrafinil. Modafinil sulfone is also a metabolite of armodafinil, the (R)-(–)-enantiomer of modafinil, as oxidation to the sulfone removes the chiral center at the sulfur atom. Modafinil sulfone has been described as inactive, and similarly to modafinil acid, does not appear to contribute to the wakefulness-promoting effects of modafinil. However, like modafinil, modafinil sulfone was found to show anticonvulsant properties in animals, indicating that it does possess some biological activity.

== See also ==
- List of modafinil analogues and derivatives
