= Pediatric narcolepsy =

Sleep disorder in children

Pediatric narcolepsy refers to conditions of narcolepsy during childhood and adolescence (during the ages 18 years and younger). In a pediatric setting, people with narcolepsy still exhibit the classical tetrad symptoms of narcolepsy, and thus is possible for both type 1 and type 2 narcolepsy to develop in adolescence.

== Pediatric population characteristics ==
Pediatric narcolepsy cases are cases when patients are diagnosed or experience symptoms onset for narcolepsy before the age of 18. Of patients who obtain a formal diagnosis for narcolepsy, more than 50% report first experiencing symptoms of narcolepsy more than 10 years before their formal diagnosis, with an average age of symptom onset being at age 15 and symptom onset most likely to occur during a person's second decade. The overall prevalence of narcolepsy in a population is around 0.05% and is not impacted by population age. The most common symptom that occurs with symptom onset is excessive daytime sleepiness (EDS). There is currently no known difference in the prevalence of narcolepsy across sex, race, or ethnicity. Like in adult populations, type 1 narcolepsy is more common than type 2 narcolepsy; however, pediatric populations have a greater ratio of type 2 narcolepsy to type 1 narcolepsy when compared to adult populations.

== Pathophysiology ==
=== Type 1 narcolepsy ===
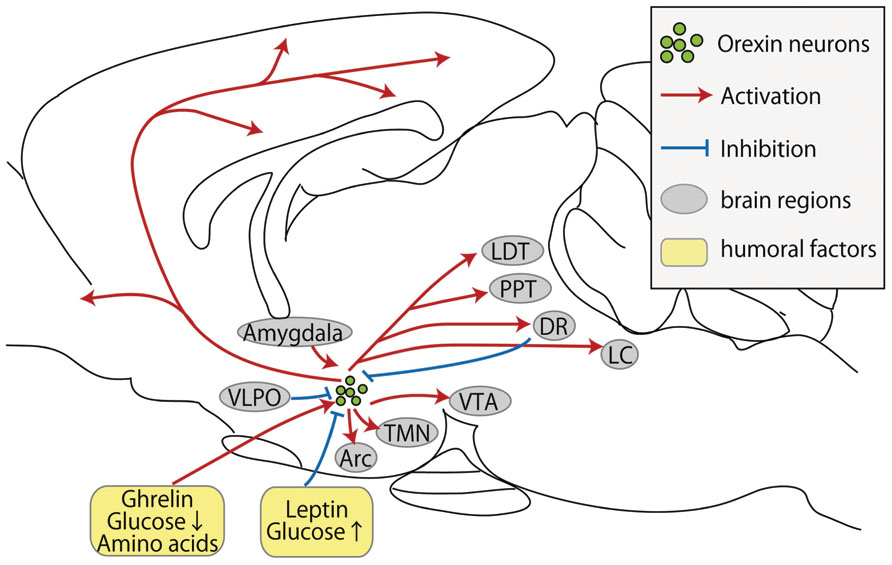
A Diagram of Projections to and from the orexin producing cells in the lateral hypothalamus. Abbreviations: LDT, laterodorsal tegmental nucleus; PPT, pedunculopontine tegmental nucleus; DR, dorsal raphe nucleus; LC, locus coeruleus; VTA, ventral tegmental area; TMN, tuberomammillary nucleus; Arc, arcuate nucleus; VLPO, ventrolateral preoptic nucleus.

Type 1 narcolepsy, also known as narcolepsy with cataplexy, can have various causes and factors, but ultimately culminates in death of neuronal orexin producing cells located in the lateral hypothalamus and a decrease in orexin concentrations in the cerebral spinal fluid. Normally, orexin acts as a neurotransmitter and is projected to various areas brain through its interaction with orexin receptors, a type of G protein-coupled receptor. Importantly, the dorsal raphe nucleus, locus coeruleus, and tuberomammillary nucleus contain orexin receptors, are projected to by orexin cells and are known to be involved in wakefulness.

The orexin cells in the lateral hypothalamus also receive signals from various areas of the brain, including the limbic system, infralimbic cortex, nucleus accumbens, and other cells in the hypothalamus (such as the preoptic area). The limbic system is responsible for emotional state regulation, it is suspected that interruption of the projections between the limbic system and orexin cells is involved with cataplexy, the second hallmark symptom of type 1 narcolepsy.

Orexin cells are also impacted by factors associated with diet and nutrition. It has been shown that ghrelin, a hormone involved with initiation of a hunger state, depolarizes and activates orexin cells. In contrast, leptin, a hormone that monitors energy availability, hyperpolarizes and inhibits orexin cell activity. This, in addition to studies that demonstrate that the destruction of orexin cells is associated with obesity, support the idea of orexin playing a role in nutrition sensing in addition to its role in promoting wakefulness.

The primary genetic risk factor associated with the development of narcolepsy is a variant of the human leukocyte antigen complex (HLA) known as HLA DQB1*06:02 and supports a potential autoimmune hypothesis for the development of type 1 narcolepsy.

=== Type 2 narcolepsy ===
The pathophysiology of type 2 narcolepsy is not fully understood and is difficult to study. This is because, by definition, type 2 narcolepsy is narcolepsy without the symptom of cataplexy. This means that while type 1 narcolepsy (narcolepsy with cataplexy) has a defined pathophysiology, type 2 narcolepsy is a term to describe narcolepsy arising from other means.

== Signs and symptoms ==
=== Clinical signs and symptoms ===
==== Classic tetrad ====
The Classic tetrad of symptoms include Excessive Daytime Sleepiness (EDS), Cataplexy, hypnogogic and/or hypnopompic hallucinations, and Sleep paralysis. While patients with narcolepsy don't necessarily experience all symptoms of the classic tetrad, it is unlikely for a patient with narcolepsy to not have at least one of these symptoms.

==== Excessive daytime sleepiness ====
Excessive daytime sleepiness, also known as hypersomnolence, is often the primary, if not only, symptom experienced at symptom onset. EDS is often masked as a person having low energy and may not be considered significant by doctors in comparison to other symptoms experienced by patients with narcolepsy. Despite being the primary symptom of narcolepsy, EDS is also a common symptom resulting from sleep apnea and other sleep related conditions, potentially complicating the ability for doctors to link a patient's EDS to narcolepsy. Determination of EDS is usually done through surveys like the Epworth Sleepiness Scale.

==== Cataplexy ====
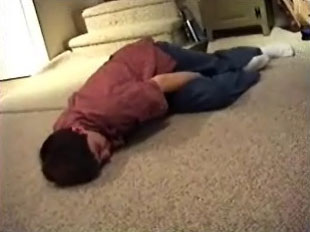
An instance of cataplexy resulting in loss of motor control.

Cataplectic attacks are episodes of lost muscle tone that are initiated by bouts of intense emotions. These events are known to cause a phenomenon known as cataplectic facies, a distinct facial expression that involves a slackened mouth and a drooping tongue. which is Emotions that can trigger a cataplectic attack include laughter, excitement, anger, fear, and frustration. Cataplexy is indicative of Type 1 narcolepsy, and usually becomes present one to three years after the onset of EDS. Because of this delay in onset, cataplexy is thought to be developed over time and results in a decreased prevalence in pediatric populations compared to adult populations.

==== Hypnogogic/hypnopompic hallucinations ====
Hypnogogic and hypnopompic hallucinations are hallucinations that occur upon waking up or when a person is about to fall asleep respectively. These hallucinations often accompany sleep paralysis, another symptom of the classic tetrad. While still being investigated, several studies report that hypnogogic hallucinations are prevalent in roughly 50% of pediatric narcolepsy cases, but prevalence of hallucinations has varied widely in several studies.

===== Sleep paralysis =====
Sleep paralysis is phenomena when a person is unable to move and speak after waking up. Due to difficulty in pediatric populations being able to properly describe the experience of sleep paralysis, there has been difficulty in determining potential differences in the prevalence and severity of sleep paralysis between pediatric and adult populations.

Clinical Signs and Symptoms of Narcolepsy
Classic tetrad	Other clinical symptoms associated with narcolepsy
Excessive daytime sleepiness	REM behavior disorder
Cataplexy	Periodic limb movements
Sleep paralysis	Precocious puberty
Hypnogogic/Hypnopompic hallucinations	Sudden weight gain
	Polyendocrine metabolic ovarian syndrome (PMOS)
	Disturbed nocturnal sleep
	Autonomic actions

=== "Behavioral" signs ===
Children with narcolepsy may develop depressive feelings, hyperactivity, irritability, brain fog, and dullness. These behaviors are thought to be attributed to downstream effects of disturbed nighttime sleep patterns and EDS. EDS has been shown to have a strong impact on academic standing, with a strong correlation between narcolepsy and worsening academic performance. In addition, other symptoms of narcolepsy, such as weight gain, can lead patients becoming withdrawn, introverted, and other features that can indicate depression.

== Diagnosis ==
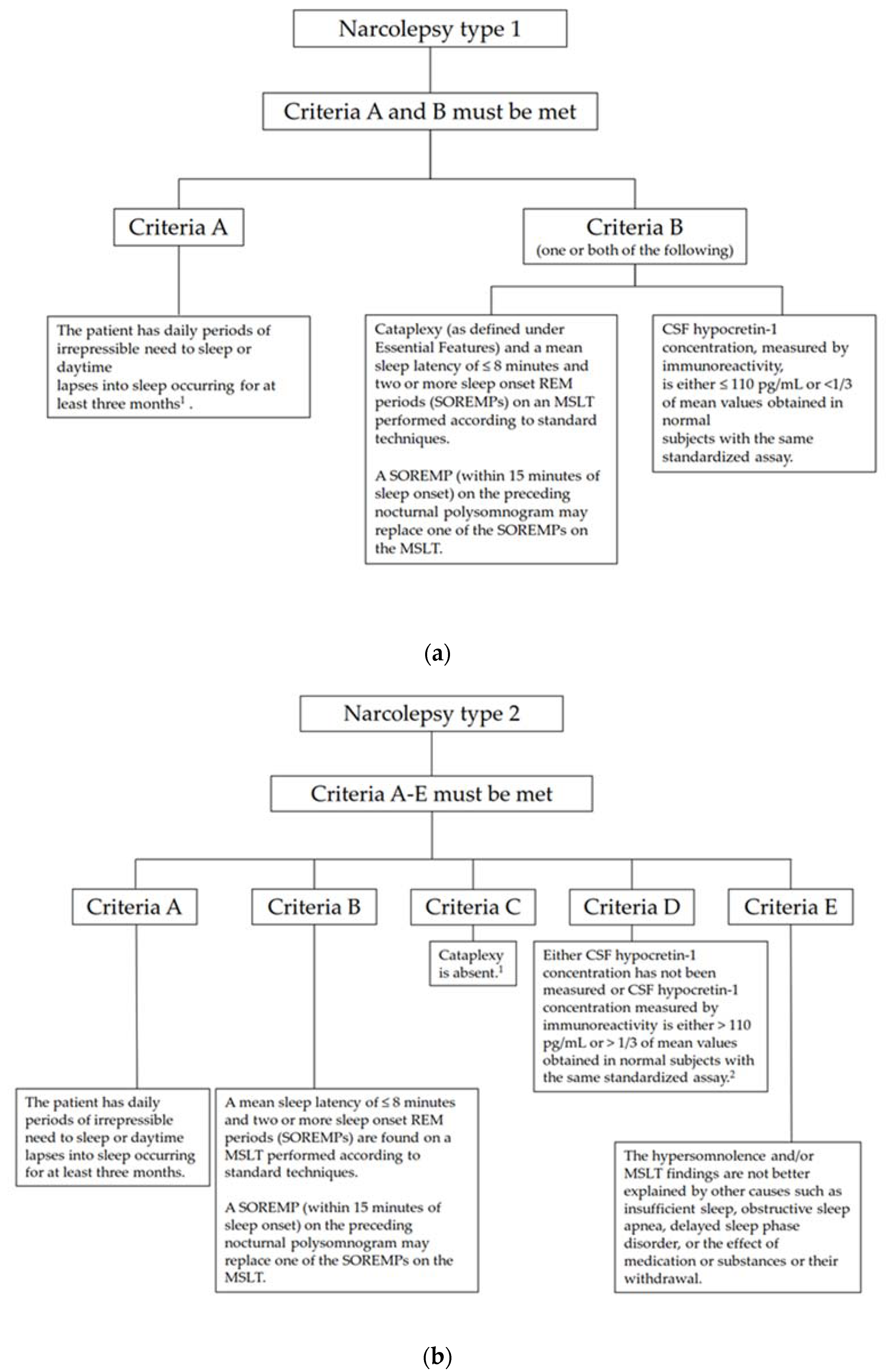
Diagnostic Criteria for Narcolepsy type I and II according to the third edition of the International Classification of Sleep Disorders.

As per the third edition of International Classification of Sleep Disorders (ICSD-3), Narcolepsy can be diagnosed after several criteria have been met. The first criteria is for the presence of EDS. A formal diagnosis of narcolepsy can then be given if the diagnostic criteria for the Multiple Sleep Latency Test (MSLT) post polysomnogram (PSG) are met. Diagnosis can be further classified into narcolepsy type 1 or narcolepsy type 2 based on the presence of cataplectic symptoms or cerebrospinal hypocretin-1 deficiency. The presence of cataplectic symptoms or hypocretin deficiency favors a narcolepsy type 1 diagnosis. While not mentioned in the ICSD-3, the second edition has the added criteria of not being able to explain EDS with another condition or medication and expands on experiencing EDS for at least 3 months. While not necessary for a diagnosis of narcolepsy, certain survey questionnaires like the Epworth sleepiness scale can be useful in determining the presence and absence of symptoms associated with narcolepsy.

If type 1 narcolepsy is suspected, it is possible to obtain a diagnosis through testing for orexin concentrations in the cerebrospinal fluid. Patients with type 1 narcolepsy typically have measured orexin concentrations of 110 pg/mL or lower. Cases of type 2 narcolepsy will be unable to be determined through this measurement due to type 2 narcolepsy patients typically having normal concentrations of orexin.

MSLT diagnostic criteria for narcolepsy
Parameter	Threshold
Maximum mean sleep latency (minutes)	8
Minimum number of sleep-onset rapid eye movement periods (SOREPs)	2

== Treatment ==
=== Non-medication based interventions ===
Nonpharmacological measures to assist in the management of symptoms of narcolepsy focus on regulating and maintaining healthy sleep habits. In addition to having set periods for nocturnal sleep, scheduled naps may be incorporated into a person's lifestyle in order to stave off the impacts of EDS. Regular physical activity and healthy diets, in addition to improve alertness and combat EDS, can also provide benefits in improving potential weight gain resulting from narcolepsy as well as improve depressive and other mood symptoms associated with EDS and narcolepsy.

=== Medication-based interventions ===
Commonly prescribed medications for the treatment of symptoms of narcolepsy
Medication	Medication type	Treated symptom(s)	Approval status for the treatment of narcolepsy
Modafinil	Wake promoting agent	EDS	FDA approved for ages 18 and above
Sodium oxybate	Central nervous system depressant	Cataplexy, Hallucinations, sleep paralysis	FDA approved for ages 7 and above
Pitolisant	histamine 3 (H_{3}) receptor antagonist	EDS/Cataplexy	PDA approved for adults, in trials for use in a pediatric setting
Methylphenidate	Traditional stimulant	EDS	FDA approved for ages 6 and above
Dextroamphetamine	Traditional stimulant	EDS	FDA approved for Ages 6 and above
Clomipramine	Tricyclic antidepressant (TCA)	Cataplexy	Not approved for pediatric patients
Desipramine	Tricyclic antidepressant (TCA)	Cataplexy	Not approved for pediatric patients
Imipramine	Tricyclic antidepressant (TCA)	Cataplexy	Not approved for pediatric patients
Protryptylin	Tricyclic antidepressant (TCA)	Cataplexy	Not approved for pediatric patients
Fluoxetine	SSRI	Cataplexy	Not approved for pediatric patients
Venlafaxine	SNRI	Cataplexy	Not approved for pediatric patients

== Stigma and diagnostic complications ==
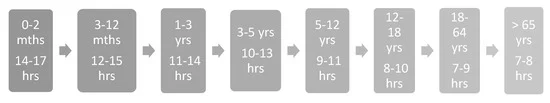
Expected healthy ranges of sleep separated by age range. As depicted, expect healthy ranges of obtained sleep decreases with age and allow for easier identification of EDS.

Complications in diagnosis narcolepsy can delay an official diagnosis for more than 10 years. Various factors are known to contribute to the diagnostic delay. Before a formal diagnosis of narcolepsy, there is often a misdiagnosis for an alternative, more common condition that could be attributed to the experienced symptoms. Conditions like Attention deficit hyperactive disorder (ADHD), depression, and schizophrenia have been known to be potential misdiagnosis for narcolepsy. Economic barriers may also delay diagnosis, as an official diagnosis may involve visiting multiple to either one doctor or multiple doctors. Diagnosis of narcolepsy may also be delayed as a result of symptoms of narcolepsy potentially being attributed to normal behaviors of certain age groups. Napping as a result of EDS is often confused with naps taken by younger children, EDS may be harder to identify at younger ages due to greater sleep requirements, and many behavioral signs stemming from the impacts of EDS could be seen as "rebellious" teen behaviors. Additionally, the inability of younger children to properly describe their symptoms may impact the suspected average age of onset.

=== Common comorbidities ===
==== Attention deficit hyperactive disorder ====
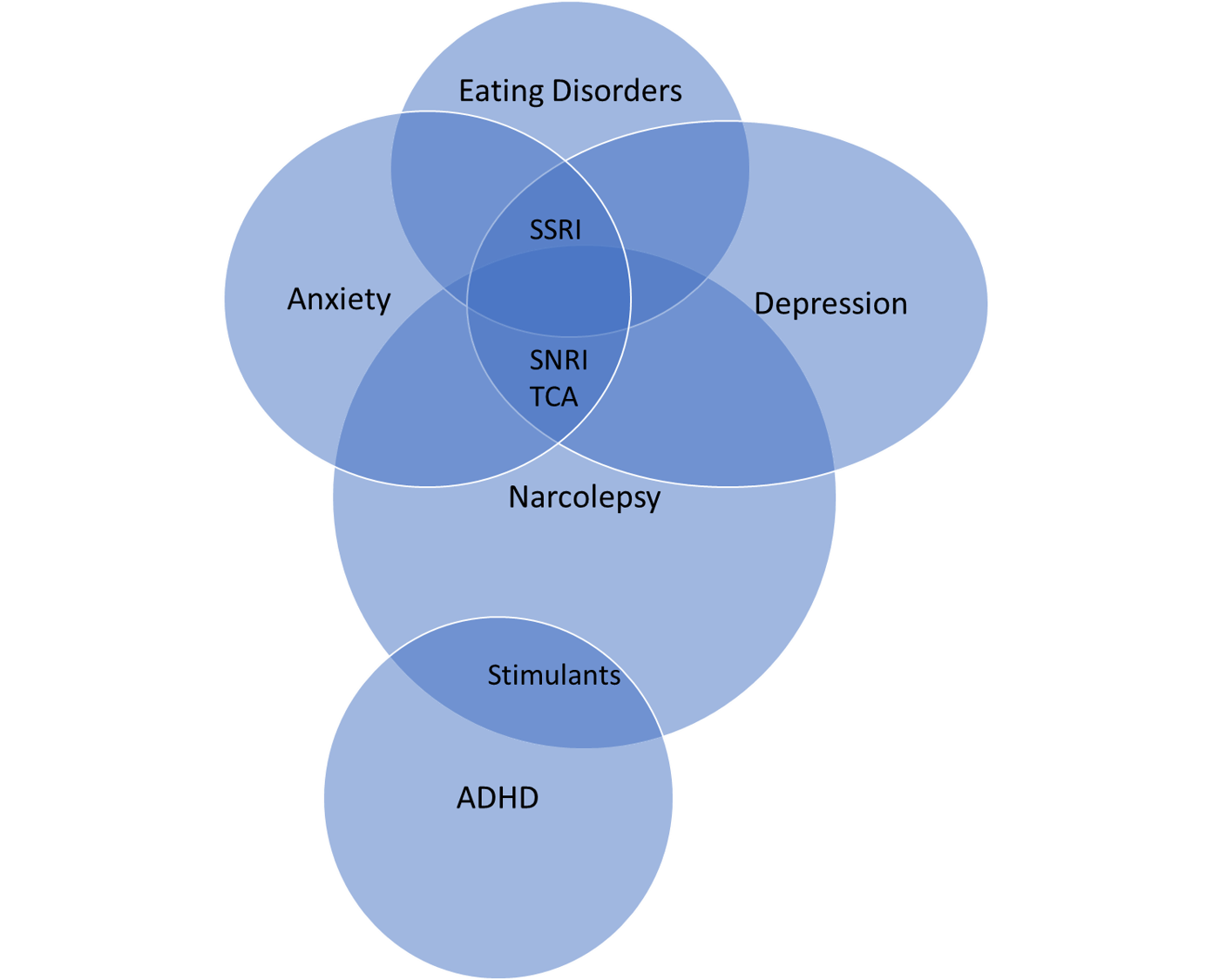
A Venn Diagram depicting psychiatric conditions associated with narcolepsy as well as medication interventions common between these conditions. Figure was adapted from doi:10.3390/medsci6010016.

Attention Deficit Hyperactive Disorder (ADHD) is a psychiatric disorder that can often present in similar manners to narcolepsy and is a common comorbidity given to people with narcolepsy. However, due to prescribed medications for ADHD (serotonin reuptake inhibitors and serotonin-norepinephrine reuptake inhibitors) also being effective for the treatment of EDS, it is likely that diagnosis of ADHD can delay and hide the presence of narcolepsy. Not only is the expected age of onset of ADHD similar to that of narcolepsy, but several symptoms of ADHD overlap with those experienced by those with narcolepsy. Not only do they both share the potential for sleep disturbances and periodic limb movements during sleep, but ADHD may also present as mental fog, another symptom potentially resulting from the disturbed sleep experienced by those with narcolepsy. Disturbed sleep and overall sleepiness experienced by those with narcolepsy may contribute to the potential development of ADHD in addition to narcolepsy, making ADHD a common comorbidity with narcolepsy in addition to being a potential misdiagnosis altogether.

==== Depression ====
Depression is the most commonly experienced psychiatric symptom reported by people with narcolepsy, as studies have shown that more than 50% of patients with narcolepsy suffer from depression. Various symptoms of depression may also be experienced by people with narcolepsy. This is either as a direct result of narcolepsy, such as disturbed sleep and other parasomnias, or as a result of the person living life with a debilitating condition like narcolepsy, such as in cases of social withdrawal. In addition to the possibility of living with a debilitating condition contributes to the development of depression, deficiencies in hypocretin, such as in cases of type I narcolepsy, may also have an impact on emotional processing. However, this claim needs further investigation, as while studies have claimed that people with both narcolepsy and depression have developed depression before their diagnosis of narcolepsy, it may be influenced by the known delays in narcolepsy diagnosis. While more research needs to be done, current research fails to find differences in the prevalence of depression between people with type 1 and type 2 narcolepsy.

==== Anxiety disorders ====
Anxiety disorders are condition that led to elevated levels of anxiety and fear during normal life. Attention towards a potential comorbidity connection between anxiety disorders and narcolepsy has been increasing, as studies have come out to suggest that around half of patients with narcolepsy experience a form of anxiety disorder. Whether or not a person has been diagnosed with narcolepsy may also impact the kind of anxiety disorder they may develop, as panic disorders become more prevalent after official diagnosis. One potential rational may be the result of patients learning they have an incurable, life-altering condition, and may develop anxiety over triggering symptoms of narcolepsy like cataplexy. In addition to this, the prevalence of anxiety disorders was not impacted by whether the person had type 1 or type 2 narcolepsy, suggesting that the development of an anxiety disorder is likely in response to experienced symptoms, such as EDS and cataplexy, rather than the direct pathophysiology of narcolepsy. This does not rule out the possibility of direct pathophysiology leading to anxiety, as orexin cells are interconnected with areas of the brain responsible for stress responses.

==== Eating disorders ====
Eating disorders, like anorexia and bulimia, are known comorbidities of narcolepsy. The presence of these eating disorders have been attributed as a response to sudden weight gains experienced by people with narcolepsy. Due to the relationship between orexin and hunger related hormones, like leptin and ghrelin, it is also possible for a pathophysiological cause for the development of eating disorders rather than in response to experienced symptoms, but more research is needed in this area.
