= Sympathoadrenal system =

Connection of the sympathetic nervous system and adrenal medulla

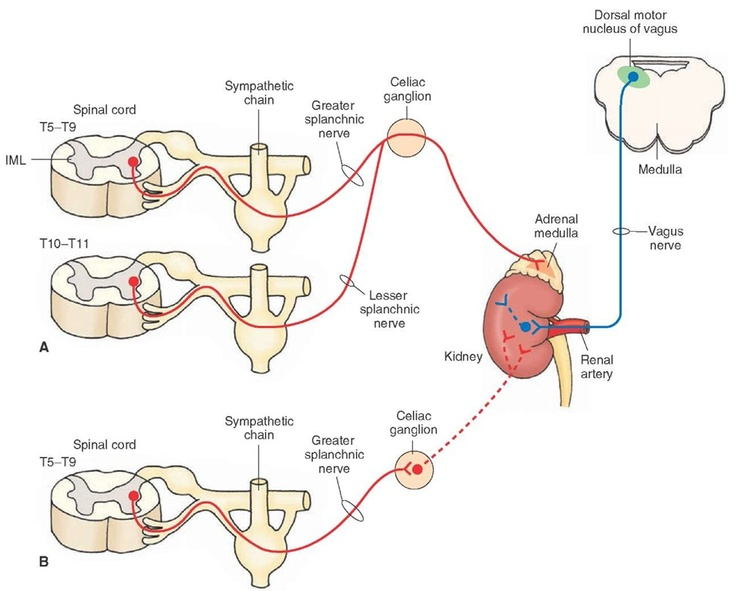
Schematic illustration of the structure of the sympathoadrenal system. Beginning in the sympathetic nervous system, an external stimulus affects the adrenal medulla and causes a release of catecholamines.

The sympathoadrenal system is a physiological connection between the sympathetic nervous system and the adrenal medulla and is crucial in an organism's physiological response to outside stimuli. When the body receives sensory information, the sympathetic nervous system sends a signal to preganglionic nerve fibers, which activate the adrenal medulla through acetylcholine. Once activated, norepinephrine and epinephrine are released directly into the blood by adrenomedullary cells where they act as the bodily mechanism for "fight-or-flight" responses. Because of this, the sympathoadrenal system plays a large role in maintaining glucose levels, sodium levels, blood pressure, and various other metabolic pathways that couple with bodily responses to the environment. During numerous diseased states, such as hypoglycemia or even stress, the body's metabolic processes are skewed. The sympathoadrenal system works to return the body to homeostasis through the activation or inactivation of the adrenal gland. However, more severe disorders of the sympathoadrenal system such as pheochromocytoma (a tumor on the adrenal medulla) can affect the body's ability to maintain a homeostatic state. In these cases, curative agents such as adrenergic agonists and antagonists are used to modify epinephrine and norepinephrine levels released by the adrenal medulla.

== Function ==
The normal function of the sympathoadrenal system is to help the body regulate responses to environmental stimuli. These stimuli travel through the sympathetic nervous system by means of preganglionic nerve fibers that emerge from the thoracic spinal cord. Electrical impulses carried by the sympathetic nervous system are converted to a chemical response in the adrenal gland. Chromaffin cells contained in the adrenal medulla act as postganglionic nerve fibers that release this chemical response into the blood as a circulating messenger. The sympathoadrenal system can activate and discharge chemical messengers as a single unit to activate an organism's “fight or flight” response. This “sympathoadrenal discharge” causes an increase in heart rate, cardiac output, blood pressure, triglyceride and glucose levels. These sympathoadrenal functions show the combined responses of the central nervous system on a multitude of external stimuli.

=== Chemical messengers ===
The two main chemical messengers of the sympathoadrenal system are norepinephrine and epinephrine (also called noradrenaline and adrenaline respectively). These chemicals are created by the adrenal glands after receiving neuronal signals from the sympathetic nervous system. The different physiological effects of these chemicals depend on the particular tissue that it innervates. As part of the sympathoadrenal system, these chemicals act rapidly and dispel quickly as opposed to the longer-lasting effect of hormones.

== Stress ==
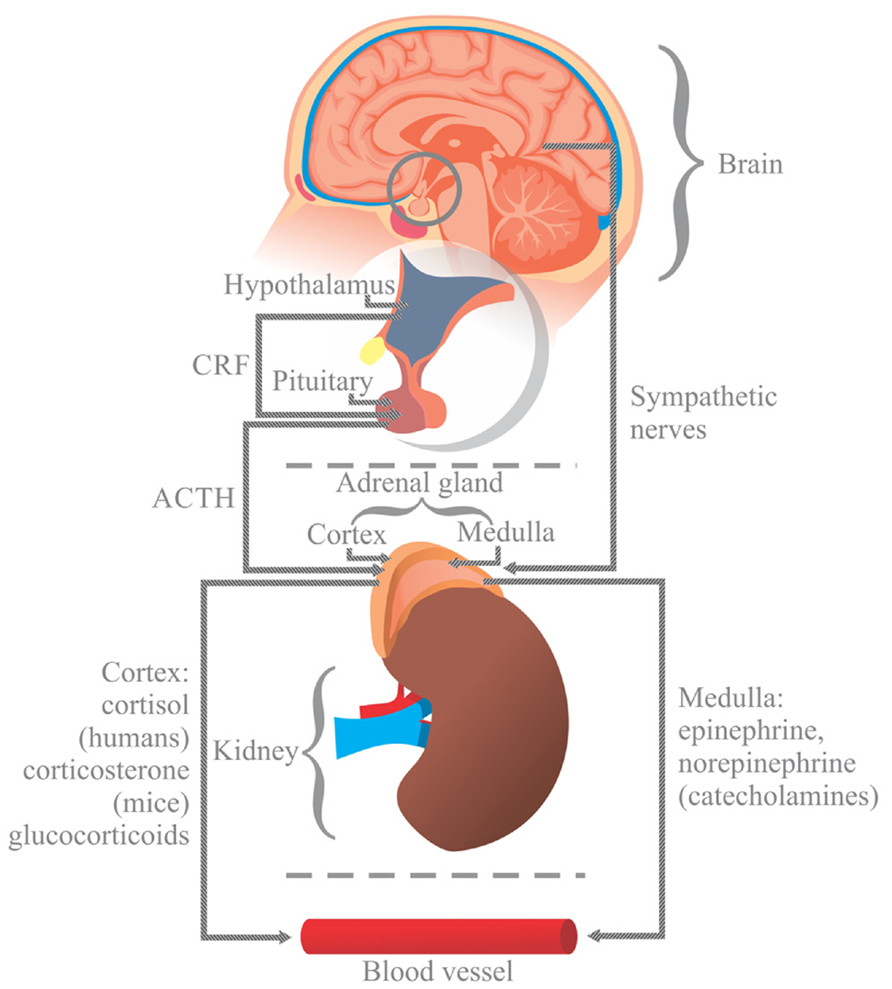
Schematic illustration of the sympathoadrenal response to stress.

In the brain, reception of a signal for a stressor by the hypothalamus leads to an increase in activity of the sympathoadrenal system, essentially within the nerves that send signals to the adrenal glands. This is done through the activation by the corticotropin-releasing factor (CRF), also known as the corticotropin-releasing hormone (CRH). Increased activity of the adrenal nerves is done through the receptors for the corticotropin-releasing factor within the ganglia within the sympathetic nervous system. Corticotropin-releasing factors travel to the pituitary gland, where they activate the release of adrenocorticotropic hormone (ACTH). The release of the adrenocorticotropic hormone is determined by the release of the corticotropin-releasing factor as the interruption of the corticotropin-releasing factor causes a weakening of the adrenocorticotropic hormone response.

Adrenocorticotropic hormones bind to ACTH receptors on the cells within the adrenal medulla and adrenal cortex, causing a signal cascade within the adrenomedullary cell, ultimately releasing catecholamines like epinephrine and norepinephrine. Concomitantly, adrenocortical cells secrete corticosteroids. These hormones (i.e., catecholamines and corticosteroids) affect a variety of organs like skeletal muscles along with the muscles surrounding certain bodily systems such as the cardiovascular system and respiratory system, causing an increase in force production by the skeletal muscles along with accelerated heart rate and breathing rate. Glucocorticoids also are in effect during times of stress for the sympathoadrenal system, but provide an inhibitory function for the protection of the body from its own immune system. The glucocorticoids work to inhibit reactions produced from the immune system during times of stress that could cause damage within the body. Glucocorticoids work to inhibit the uptake of catecholamines, like norepinephrine and epinephrine, by the nerves. The increase in activity of synthesis of norepinephrine and epinephrine within the medulla is done from glucocorticoids through the increase in reaction rate of certain enzymes, such as: tyrosine hydroxylase, aromatic L-amino acid decarboxylase, dopamine-β-hydroxylase, and phenylethanolamine N-methyltransferase.

== Hypertension and obesity ==
The release of adrenocorticotropic hormone is usually regulated within the sympathoadrenal system as it is tasked with maintenance of homeostasis; however, there are certain cases in which the levels of adrenocorticotropic hormones may be in excess, causing hypertension, or even Cushing's syndrome. Hypertension, or high blood pressure, has a multitude of possible causes, one of which being the elevated levels of ACTH. Hypertension also causes an increase in catecholamine release during experiments of stress-induced situations. While hypertension and Cushing's syndrome are not correlational, roughly 80% of individuals diagnosed with Cushing's syndrome also have hypertension. Both Cushing's syndrome, termed Cushing's disease in this case, and hypertension involve the excess production and release of adrenocorticotropic hormone. Hypertension can also be caused by the overproduction of molecules released from the sympathoadrenal system besides ACTH, such as mineralocorticoids and glucocorticoids. Overproduction of these molecules causes an increase in the production and release of the catecholamines, leading the cardiovascular system to become elevated in the systolic blood pressure and the diastolic blood pressure, along with the increase in the heart rate of the individual.

Weight gain can be accomplished through the ingestion of and storage of carbohydrates and fat. Under normal conditions, adrenal hormone receptors, type I and type II, mediate the storage of carbohydrates and fats during eating. In some cases, obesity in individuals is due to the overproduction of corticoids leads to the over-activation of receptor type I and type II, causing the deposition of fat and the storage of carbohydrates, respectively; furthermore, activation of either receptor causes the individual to sustain eating.

== Exercise and Metabolism ==
During exercise, the body undergoes an acute stress response in which more oxygen and energy is needed for physical activity. The stress induced during exercise results in an increase in the hormones, epinephrine and norepinephrine, which are known for the body's "fight or flight" response. Increased secretion of catecholamines are a hormone response regulated by the sympathoadrenal system (SAS) and the hypothalamic-pituitary-adrenal axis (HPAA). The "fight or flight" response causes the secretion of hormones such as cortisol and adrenaline which stimulate additional physiological needs to increase respiratory, cardiac, thermoregulatory, and metabolic functions in the body. As a result of specific exercise demands, the body's heart rate also increases, allowing for more blood to pump through the body, therefore carrying more oxygen needed for the enhanced cardiorespiratory ventilation and skeletal muscular functions. In exercise trained individuals, a phenomenon known as the "sport adrenal medulla" may explain the higher levels of catecholamines, epinephrine, and norepinephrine compared to those who do not actively train as much. This indicates a relationship between competition performance and sympathetic activity, or those with a higher basal catecholamine secretion on average. Increased catecholamine secretion through the sympathoadrenal response provides direct input on the hypertrophy process of the heart, which causes increased vasodilation and vasoconstriction to meet the increased cardiorespiratory demands. Therefore trained individuals become accustomed to utilizing less oxygen when performing anaerobic exercises. Increased plasma concentrations of epinephrine, norepinephrine, corticotropin hormone (ACTH), have been shown to be strong predictors of performance during high intensity exercise in regards to maximum aerobic power (MAP), and reaction time (RT). Additionally the acute hormone response results in an increase in glycogen hydrolysis which ultimately increases glucose release needed for energy.

Metabolism, or the processes within living cells or organisms to maintain life, is affected by the sympathoadrenal system, especially glucose and fat metabolism. Glucose, a necessary source of energy for cells, can undergo an increase in production due to elevated secretion of epinephrine in the body. The mechanism lies in epinephrine being secreted by the adrenal medulla and activating glycogenolysis (the breakdown of glycogen into glucose, or promoting gluconeogenesis (glucose formation). While epinephrine has a greater effect in glucose production, norepinephrine can also increase glucose levels but at high concentrations. It has even been found that norepinephrine may play a role in enhancing the uptake of glucose in skeletal muscle and adipose tissues. As for fat metabolism, the catecholamines (epinephrine and norepinephrine) help stimulate lipolysis (the breakdown of fat) resulting in an increase in energy and a decrease in fat. This explains the need for exercise to help increase the body's metabolism.

== Diseases ==
=== Hypoglycemia ===
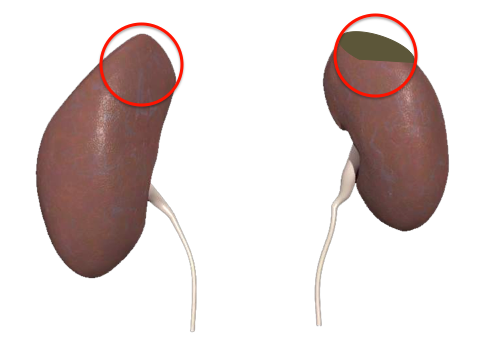
This is a representation of the kidneys in the human body. The left kidney depicted is healthy with normal functioning. The right kidney depicted has a tumor (shown inside the red circle). This disease is called pheochromocytoma and causes an increased level of adrenaline to be released into the circulatory system.

Hypoglycemia, or low blood glucose, causes cardiovascular physiological effects as a result of the sympathoadrenal system. These physiological changes include an increased heart rate, increased heart contractility, and decreased peripheral arterial resistance. Together, the effects increase peripheral blood pressure, but decrease central blood pressure. This can have larger effects on those with diabetes. Hypoglycemia may cause greater arterial wall stiffness and less elasticity, which in turn decreases blood pressure and increases the heart's workload. Symptoms of hypoglycemia related to the symapthoadrenal system include anxiety, tremors, irregular heartbeat, sweating, hunger, and paresthesia. Hypothermia and neurological deficits can also occur. Permanent brain damage is uncommon but have been seen in some who suffer from hypoglycemia. The activation of the system is assisted by norepinephrine, acetylcholine, and epinephrine. Hypoglycemia unawareness can occur because the symapthoadrenal system response is reduced, in turn, the symptoms are reduced. Since the symptoms go unnoticed, this may lead to a dangerous cycle of hypoglycemia and an increased risk of severe hypoglycemia, which can have serious consequences.

Insulin is essential in triggering the sympathoadrenal system (the release of norepinephrine and epinephrine) to respond to hypoglycemia, which then raises glucagon levels. The insulin present in the brain acts on the central nervous system by crossing the blood-brain barrier and affecting the sympathetic nervous system. Thereby, helping to initiate a response to hypoglycemia through the sympathoadrenal system. Individuals with hypoglycemia should self-monitor their blood glucose level and can take glucose in the forms of tablets or foods high in glucose. Parenteral therapy may be necessary for severe hypoglycemia. Hypoglycemia-associated autonomic failure (HAAF) can occur if left untreated. The sympathoadrenal system activity is significantly reduced because the changed glycemic threshold allows for lower glucose concentrations. Glucose cannot effectively regulate itself, decreasing epinephrine responses.

=== Pheochromocytoma ===
Pheochromocytoma are rare tumors that secrete catecholamines and affect the sympathoadrenal system. They are typically found inside the adrenal medulla, but can also be present right outside the adrenal medulla in tissue. Symptoms include headaches, sweating, palpitations, hypertension, hypoglycemia, anxiety, weight loss, fever, nausea, and cardiovascular complications. Pheochromocytoma can be treated through blocking the effects of the secreted catecholamines. Ideally, removal of the tumor is the preferred treatment and should be done in a timely manner for the best prognosis. On average, there is a delay of three years between initial symptoms and diagnosis because the tumors are hard to find. Diagnosis is also difficult because the symptoms are highly variable and very common in other diseases. If pheochromocytoma remains untreated, it may lead to fatal consequences especially to the cardiovascular system.
