= Cephalon (company) =

American biopharmaceutical company

Cephalon, Inc.
- Type: Subsidiary
- Traded as: Nasdaq: CEPH
- Industry: Biotechnology, Biopharmaceutical
- Founded: 1987; 39 years ago
- Founder: Frank Baldino Michael Lewis James C. Kauer
- Headquarters: Frazer, Pennsylvania
- Key people: J. Kevin Buchi (CEO)
- Products: alertness drug Provigil, the painkiller Actiq, seizure medication Gabitril
- Number of employees: 3,726 (December 31, 2010)
- Parent: Teva Pharmaceutical Industries
- Website: www.cephalon.com

Cephalon, Inc. was an American biopharmaceutical company co-founded in 1987 by pharmacologist Frank Baldino, Jr., neuroscientist Michael Lewis, and organic chemist James C. Kauer—all three former scientists with the DuPont Company. Baldino served as Cephalon's chairman and chief executive officer, until his death in December 2010. The company's name comes from the adjective "cephalic" meaning "related to the head or brain", as it was established primarily to pursue treatments for neurodegenerative diseases.

As noted by fundinguniverse.com:

Cephalon initially avoided involving itself in activities that would require maintaining a sales staff, managing clinical trials, and shepherding new drugs through the Food and Drug Administration (FDA) approval process. With no product to sell, Cephalon's only asset was its scientific expertise. That expertise proved sufficient to attract investors, and the company managed to fund its operations through research grants and contracts with larger pharmaceutical firms.

Cephalon was first included in the Fortune 1000 list of U.S. companies based upon annual revenues for 2006. Sales revenues reached $2.8 billion in 2010, ranking Cephalon among the leading biopharmaceutical companies in the world at that time.

On May 2, 2011, Teva Pharmaceutical Industries announced it would acquire Cephalon. The deal was completed on October 11, 2011.

== Product development and acquisition history ==
The company's early research efforts were focused on the development of IGF-1, an insulin-like growth factor, in collaboration with Chiron Corporation, toward the development of a treatment for amyotrophic lateral sclerosis (Lou Gehrig's Disease), a candidate that was never approved.

Thereafter, the company developed and commercialized products for the treatment of sleep disorders, pain, addiction and cancer, establishing the "wake franchise" on the basis of Provigil (modafinil) and later, Nuvigil, the R-enantiomer of modafinil. In addition to conducting research on kinase inhibitors and other small molecules, Cephalon licensed other compounds, purchased other products, and acquired entire companies, in the latter case, including CIMA Labs, Anesta, and Laboratoire Lafon. It was from Lafon that Cephalon obtained the rights to modafinil, which it marketed under the trade name Provigil, for the treatment of excessive daytime sleepiness associated with narcolepsy, sleep apnea, and shift work sleep disorder. Sales of Provigil reached nearly one billion dollars in 2008.

In February 2009, Cephalon acquired the Australian biotechnology firm, Arana Therapeutics, which brought Cephalon its lead biologic candidate, ART621, a candidate for inflammatory diseases, and biologics for the treatment of cancers. Then, as infogrok.com noted in February 2010, "Cephalon... exercised its option to acquire Ception Therapeutics, following receipt of positive data from a clinical study in adults with eosinophilic asthma." Commenting on this, Frank Baldino Jr., CEO of Cephalon, said, "The acquisition of Ception is consistent with our strategy to diversify into biologics and provides us with an important phase three asset for further development."

At the time of Baldino's death in 2010, the company he had co-founded in 1987 was best known for the alertness drug Provigil, the painkiller Actiq, and the seizure disorder medication Gabitril. In 2011, Cephalon agreed to acquire ChemGenex Pharmaceuticals, which would provided Cephalon with marketing rights to Omapro, a therapeutic agent for a drug-resistant leukemia, in the oncology therapeutic area.

== Management and locations ==
Longtime chief financial officer J. Kevin Buchi succeeded Baldino as CEO in 2011. Members of the board included: venture capitalist William Egan, former COR Therapeutics CEO Vaughan Kailian, prominent healthcare economist Dr. Gail Wilensky, former SmithKline Beecham executive Dr. Martyn Greenacre, former Harvard physician and Glaxo USA head Dr. Charles Sanders and former Ambassador Kevin Moley.

The company was headquartered west of Philadelphia, in Frazer, Pennsylvania, and had research operations in nearby West Chester and manufacturing and other operations in suburban Minneapolis, Minnesota and Salt Lake City, Utah. European operations were based near Paris, France. After the acquisition of Arana, Research and Development operations continued in Sydney, Australia.

== Legal issues ==
In 1999 Cephalon settled a lawsuit for $17 million in which it had faced claims that Baldino and other company executives had overstated the potential for a drug aimed at treating amyotrophic lateral sclerosis (Lou Gehrig's disease). In addition, the Federal Trade Commission filed suit against Cephalon, stating that it had made "illegal deals with generic drug companies to delay generic competition to Provigil", an accusation that Cephalon has reportedly disputed. In September 2008, Cephalon paid $425 million to the federal government to settle four whistleblower lawsuits and a criminal charge alleging Cephalon had marketed Actiq, Gabitril and Provigil for “off-label” (unapproved) uses.

In May 2015 the US Federal Trade Commission announced a $1.2 billion settlement of its “pay-for-delay” case concerning Provigil, with funds to be returned to purchasers affected by anticompetitive conduct.

== Products ==
Select products that Cephalon manufactured and marketed included:

- Actiq (fentanyl citrate)
- Amrix (cyclobenzaprine)
- Fentora (fentanyl)
- Gabitril (tiagabine)
- Nuvigil (armodafinil)
- Provigil (modafinil)
- Treanda (bendamustine HCl)
- Trisenox (arsenic trioxide)

== See also ==
- Teva Pharmaceutical Industries
- Modafinil
