= Peak-to-trough ratio =

Pharmacokinetic metrics

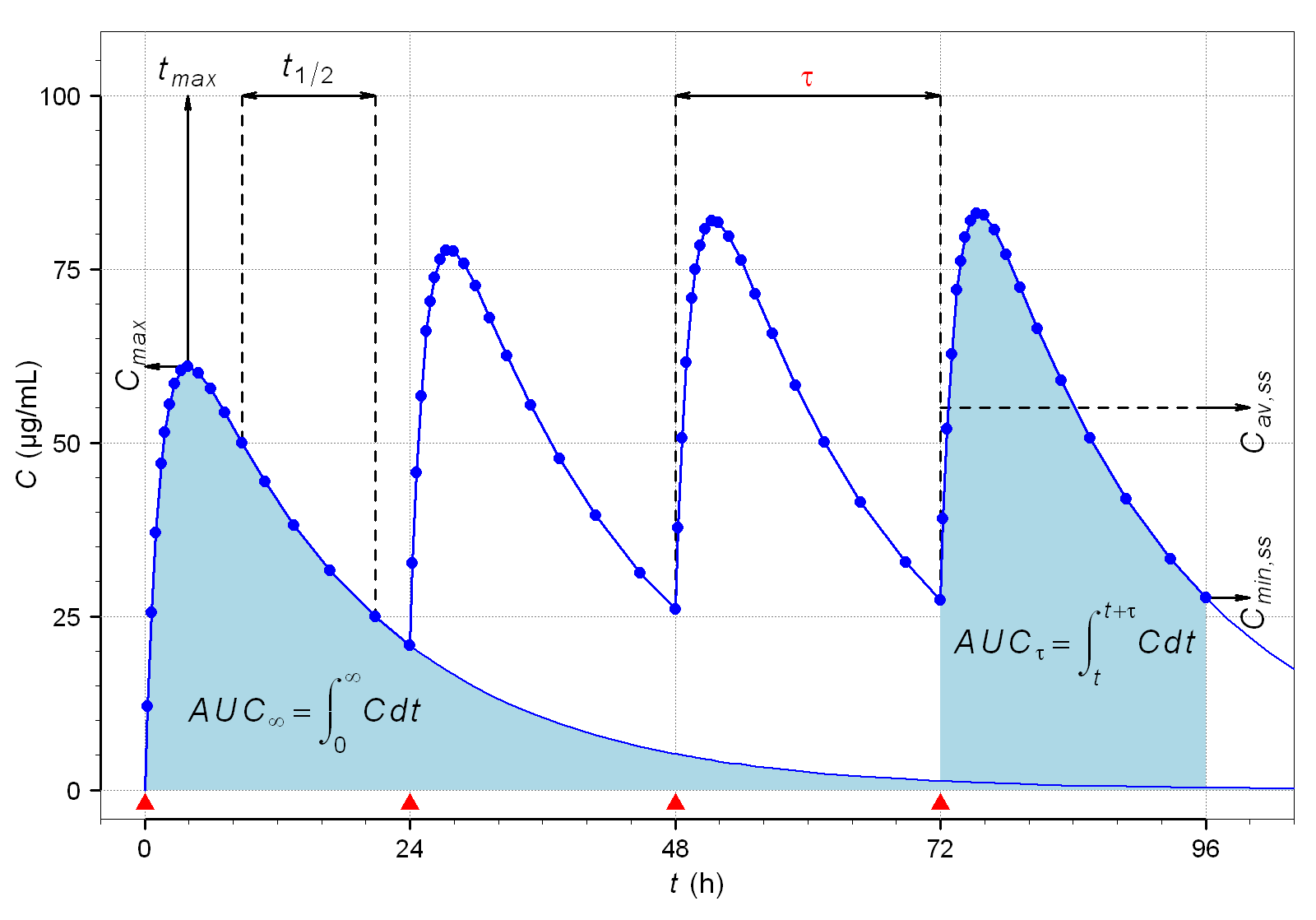
Peak-to-trough ratio in pharmacokinetics is the ratio of peak (C_{max}) and trough (C_{min}) levels of a drug over its dosing interval (τ) at steady state.

Peak-to-trough ratio (PTR), also known as peak-to-trough variation or peak-to-trough fluctuation, is a parameter in pharmacokinetics which is defined as the ratio of C_{max} (peak) concentration and C_{min} (trough) concentration over a dosing interval for a given drug. A drug with an elimination half-life of 24 hours taken once per day will have a peak-to-trough ratio of approximately 2. Peak-to-trough ratio depends on half-life and dosing interval, with longer half-lives and shorter dosing intervals giving smaller ratios.
