= C23H23ClN6O2 =

The molecular formula C_{23}H_{23}ClN_{6}O_{2} (molar mass: 450.921 g/mol) may refer to:

- Daridorexant, formerly known as nemorexant
- Suvorexant
