= Insomnia =

Disorder causing trouble with sleeping

- Other names: Sleeplessness, trouble sleeping
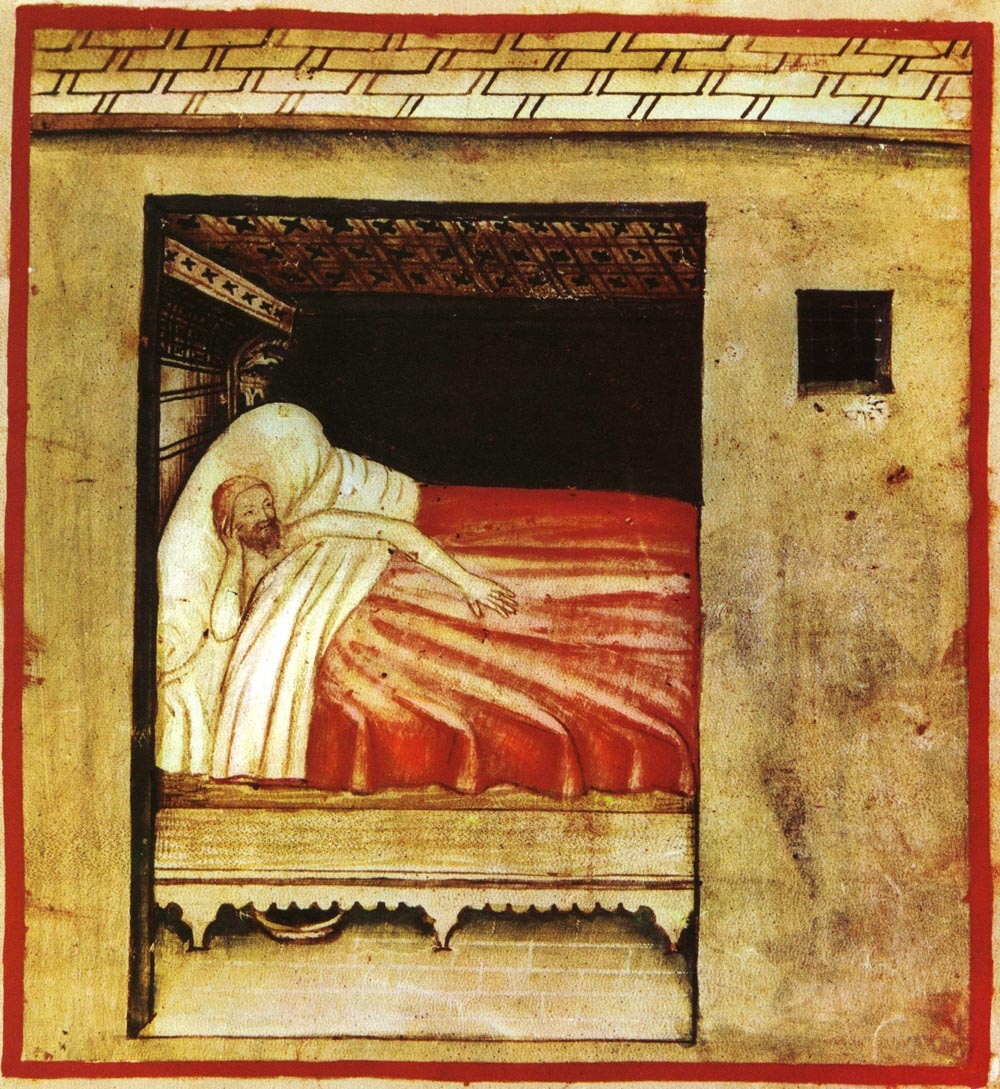
- Depiction of insomnia from the 14th century medical manuscript Tacuinum Sanitatis
- Pronunciation: /ɪnˈsɒmniə/
- Specialty: Psychiatry, clinical psychology, sleep medicine
- Symptoms: Trouble sleeping, daytime sleepiness, low energy, irritability, depressed mood
- Causes: Unknown, psychological stress, chronic pain, heart failure, hyperthyroidism, heartburn, restless legs syndrome, autism spectrum disorder, obstructive sleep apnea, others
- Diagnostic method: Based on symptoms, sleep study
- Differential diagnosis: Delayed sleep phase disorder, restless legs syndrome, sleep apnea, psychiatric disorder
- Treatment: Sleep hygiene, cognitive behavioral therapy, hypnotics
- Frequency: ~20%

Insomnia, also known as sleeplessness, is a sleep disorder causing difficulty falling asleep or staying asleep for as long as desired. Insomnia is typically followed by daytime sleepiness, low energy, irritability, and a depressed mood. It may result in an increased risk of accidents as well as problems focusing and learning. Insomnia can be short-term, lasting for days or weeks, or long-term, lasting more than a month. The concept of the word insomnia has two distinct possibilities: insomnia disorder or insomnia symptoms. Symptoms associated with chronic insomnia involve at least three episodes per week for at least a three month period.

Insomnia can occur independently or as a result of another problem. Conditions that can result in insomnia include psychological stress, chronic pain, heart failure, hyperthyroidism, heartburn, restless leg syndrome, perimenopause, menopause, certain medications, and use of drugs such as caffeine, nicotine, and alcohol. Risk factors include working night shifts and sleep apnea. Diagnosis is based on sleep habits and an examination to look for underlying causes. A sleep study may be done to look for underlying sleep disorders. Screening may be done with questions like "Do you experience difficulty sleeping?" or "Do you have difficulty falling or staying asleep?"

Cognitive behavioral therapy is considered the first-line treatment. Sleep hygiene and lifestyle changes are also recommended for insomnia, though more research is being conducted to determine the efficacy of cognitive behavioral therapy treatments for insomnia. Sleep hygiene includes a consistent bedtime, a quiet and dark room, exposure to sunlight during the day and regular exercise. Sleeping pills can improve sleep, though some are associated with falls, cognitive impairment, and dependence. These medications are not recommended for more than four or five weeks but can be used longer in certain instances. Among these, lemborexant and eszopiclone have the most favorable efficacy and safety profiles. The efficacy and safety of alternative medicine treatments are unclear.

Between 10% and 30% of adults have insomnia at any given point in time, and up to half of people have insomnia in a given year. About 6% of people have insomnia that is not due to another problem and lasts for more than a month. People over the age of 65 are affected more often than younger people. Women are more often affected than men. Descriptions of insomnia occur at least as far back as ancient Greece.

== Signs and symptoms ==
Potential complications of insomnia

Symptoms of insomnia:

- Difficulty falling asleep, including difficulty finding a comfortable sleeping position
- Waking during the night, being unable to return to sleep, and waking up early
- Not able to focus on daily tasks, difficulty in remembering
- Daytime sleepiness, irritability, depression or anxiety
- Feeling tired or having low energy during the day
- Trouble concentrating
- Being irritable, acting aggressive, or impulsive
- Memory impairment

Sleep onset insomnia is difficulty falling asleep at the beginning of the night, often a symptom of anxiety disorders. Delayed sleep phase disorder can be misdiagnosed as insomnia, as sleep onset is delayed much later than normal, while awakening spills over into daylight hours.

It is common for people who have difficulty falling asleep to also have nocturnal awakenings with difficulty returning to sleep. Two-thirds of these people wake up in the middle of the night, with more than half having trouble falling back to sleep after a middle-of-the-night awakening.

Early morning awakening occurs earlier (more than 30 minutes) than desired, with an inability to go back to sleep and before total sleep time reaches 6.5 hours. Early morning awakening is often a characteristic of depression. Anxiety symptoms may well lead to insomnia. Some of these symptoms include psychological stress, compulsive worrying about the future, feeling overstimulated, and overanalyzing past events.

Chronic insomnia may take a mental toll, affecting social interactions, work, and lifestyle.

=== Poor sleep quality ===
Poor sleep quality can occur as a result of, for example, restless legs, sleep apnea, or major depression. Poor sleep quality is defined as the individual not reaching stage 3 or delta sleep, which has restorative properties.

Major depression leads to alterations in the function of the hypothalamic–pituitary–adrenal axis, causing excessive release of cortisol, which can lead to poor sleep quality.

Nocturnal polyuria, excessive night-time urination, can also result in a poor quality of sleep.

=== Subjectivity ===
Sleep state misperception is a condition where people believe that they have been awake all night even though sleep tests prove that they have slept for hours. Also called paradoxical insomnia or subjective insomnia, paradoxical insomnia may affect only about 5% of people with insomnia.

Despite sleeping for multiple hours each night and typically not experiencing significant daytime sleepiness or other symptoms of sleep loss, patients feel like they have not slept very much, if at all. They incorrectly believe it takes them an abnormally long time to fall asleep, and they underestimate how long they stay asleep.

=== Problematic digital media use ===
Sleep quality and screen time or digital media use have been linked, including studies looking at media type, time of day, and age of person. Various sleep challenges or outcomes have been studied including a reduction in sleep duration, increased sleep onset latency, modifications to rapid eye movement sleep and slow-wave sleep, increased sleepiness and self-perceived fatigue, and impaired post-sleep attention span and verbal memory.

== Causes ==
While insomnia can be caused by many conditions, it can also occur without any identifiable cause, which is referred to as primary insomnia. Primary insomnia may also have an initial identifiable cause but continues after the cause is no longer present. For example, a bout of insomnia may be triggered by a stressful work or life event. However, the condition may continue after the stressful event has been resolved. In such cases, the insomnia is usually perpetuated by the anxiety or fear caused by the sleeplessness itself, rather than any external factors.

Symptoms of insomnia can be caused by or associated with:

- Sleep breathing disorders, such as sleep apnea or upper airway resistance syndrome
- Use of psychoactive drugs (such as stimulants), including certain medications, herbs, caffeine, nicotine, cocaine, amphetamines, methylphenidate, aripiprazole, MDMA, modafinil, or excessive alcohol intake
- Use of or withdrawal from alcohol and other sedatives, such as anti-anxiety and sleep drugs like benzodiazepines
- Use of or withdrawal from pain-relievers such as opioids
- Heart disease
- Restless legs syndrome, which can cause sleep onset insomnia due to the discomforting sensations felt and the need to move the legs or other body parts to relieve these sensations
- Periodic limb movement disorder (PLMD), which occurs during sleep and can cause arousals of which the sleeper is unaware
- Pain: an injury or condition that causes pain can preclude an individual from finding a comfortable position in which to fall asleep, and can also cause awakening.
- Hormone shifts such as those that precede menstruation and those during perimenopause and menopause
- Life events such as fear, stress, anxiety, emotional or mental tension, work problems, financial stress, birth of a child, and bereavement
- Gastrointestinal issues such as heartburn or constipation
- Mental, neurobehavioral, or neurodevelopmental disorders such as bipolar disorder, clinical depression, generalized anxiety disorder, post-traumatic stress disorder, schizophrenia, obsessive–compulsive disorder, autism, dementia, ADHD, and fetal alcohol spectrum disorder
- Disturbances of the circadian rhythm, such as shift work and jet lag, can cause an inability to sleep at some times of the day and excessive sleepiness at other times of the day. Chronic circadian rhythm disorders are characterized by similar symptoms.
- Certain neurological disorders such as brain lesions, or a history of traumatic brain injury
- Medical conditions such as hyperthyroidism
- Abuse of over-the-counter or prescription sleep aids (sedative or depressant drugs) can produce rebound insomnia
- Poor sleep hygiene, e.g., noise or over-consumption of caffeine
- A rare genetic condition can cause a prion-based, permanent, and eventually fatal form of insomnia called fatal familial insomnia
- Physical exercise: exercise-induced insomnia is common in athletes in the form of prolonged sleep onset latency
- Increased exposure to the blue light from artificial sources, such as phones or computers
- Chronic pain
- Lower back pain
- Asthma
- Parkinson's disease

Sleep studies using polysomnography have suggested that people who have sleep disruption have elevated night-time levels of circulating cortisol and adrenocorticotropic hormone. They also have an elevated metabolic rate, which does not occur in people who do not have insomnia but whose sleep is intentionally disrupted during a sleep study. Studies of brain metabolism using positron emission tomography (PET) scans indicate that people with insomnia have higher metabolic rates by night and by day. The question remains whether these changes are the causes or consequences of long-term insomnia.

=== Genetics ===
Heritability estimates of insomnia vary between 38% in males to 59% in females. A genome-wide association study (GWAS) identified 3 genomic loci and 7 genes that influence the risk of insomnia and showed that insomnia is highly polygenic. In particular, a strong positive association was observed for the MEIS1 gene in both males and females. This study showed that the genetic architecture of insomnia strongly overlaps with psychiatric disorders and metabolic traits.

It has been hypothesized that epigenetics might also influence insomnia through a controlling process of both sleep regulation and brain-stress response, having an impact as well on brain plasticity.

=== Substance-induced ===
==== Alcohol-induced ====
Alcohol is often used as a form of self-treatment for insomnia to induce sleep. However, alcohol use to induce sleep can be a cause of insomnia. Long-term use of alcohol is associated with a decrease in NREM stage 3 and 4 sleep as well as suppression of REM sleep and REM sleep fragmentation. Frequent moving between sleep stages occurs with awakenings due to headaches, the need to urinate, dehydration, and excessive sweating. Glutamine rebound also plays a role when someone is drinking; alcohol inhibits glutamine, one of the body's natural stimulants. When the person stops drinking, the body tries to make up for lost time by producing more glutamine than it needs.

The increase in glutamine levels stimulates the brain while the drinker is trying to sleep, keeping them from reaching the deepest levels of sleep. Stopping chronic alcohol use can also lead to severe insomnia with vivid dreams. During withdrawal, REM sleep is typically exaggerated as part of a rebound effect.

==== Caffeine ====
Some people experience sleep disruption or anxiety if they consume caffeine. Doses as low as 100 mg/day, such as a 6 oz (170 g) cup of coffee or two to three 12 oz (340 g) servings of caffeinated soft-drink, may continue to cause sleep disruption, among other intolerances. Non-regular caffeine users have the least caffeine tolerance for sleep disruption. Some coffee drinkers develop tolerance to its undesired sleep-disrupting effects, but others apparently do not.

==== Benzodiazepine-induced ====
Like alcohol, benzodiazepines, such as alprazolam, clonazepam, lorazepam, and diazepam, are commonly used to treat insomnia in the short-term (both prescribed and self-medicated), but worsen sleep in the long-term. While benzodiazepines can put people to sleep (i.e., inhibit NREM stage 1 and 2 sleep), while asleep, the drugs disrupt sleep architecture: decreasing sleep time, delaying time to REM sleep, and decreasing deep slow-wave sleep (the most restorative part of sleep for both energy and mood).

==== Opioid-induced ====
Opioid medications such as hydrocodone, oxycodone, and morphine are used for insomnia that is associated with pain due to their analgesic properties and hypnotic effects. Opioids can fragment sleep and decrease REM and stage 2 sleep. By producing analgesia and sedation, opioids may be appropriate in carefully selected patients with pain-associated insomnia. However, dependence on opioids can lead to long-term sleep disturbances.

=== Risk factors ===
Insomnia affects people of all age groups, but people in the following groups have a higher chance of acquiring insomnia:

- Individuals older than 60
- History of mental health disorders, including depression, etc.
- Emotional stress
- Working late-night shifts
- Traveling through different time zones
- Having chronic diseases such as diabetes, kidney disease, lung disease, Alzheimer's, or heart disease
- Alcohol or drug use disorders
- Gastrointestinal reflux disease
- Heavy smoking
- Work stress
- Individuals of low socioeconomic status
- Urban neighborhoods
- Household stress

== Mechanism ==
Two main models exist regarding the mechanism of insomnia: cognitive and physiological. The cognitive model suggests that rumination and hyperarousal contribute to preventing a person from falling asleep and might lead to an episode of insomnia.

The physiological model is based upon three major findings in people with insomnia; firstly, increased urinary cortisol and catecholamines have been found suggesting increased activity of the HPA axis and arousal; second, increased global cerebral glucose utilization during wakefulness and NREM sleep in people with insomnia; and lastly, increased full body metabolism and heart rate in those with insomnia. All these findings taken together suggest a deregulation of the arousal system, cognitive system, and HPA axis, all contributing to insomnia. However, it is unknown if the hyperarousal is a result of, or cause of insomnia. Altered levels of the inhibitory neurotransmitter GABA have been found, but the results have been inconsistent, and the implications of altered levels of such a ubiquitous neurotransmitter are unknown. Studies on whether insomnia is driven by circadian control over sleep or a wake-dependent process have shown inconsistent results, but some literature suggests a deregulation of the circadian rhythm based on core temperature. Increased beta activity and decreased delta wave activity has been observed on electroencephalograms; however, the implication of this is unknown.

Around half of post-menopausal women experience sleep disturbances, and generally, sleep disturbance is about twice as common in women as men; this appears to be due in part, but not completely, to changes in hormone levels, especially in post-menopause.

Changes in sex hormones in both men and women as they age may account in part for an increased prevalence of sleep disorders in older people.

== Diagnosis ==
In medicine, insomnia is measured using the Athens Insomnia Scale (AIS). It measures eight parameters related to sleep, represented as an overall scale which assesses an individual's sleep quality. It has excellent internal consistency and re-test reliability. The Athens Insomnia Scale for Non-Clinical Populations (AIS-NCA) has been developed and validated in English, Chinese, and German to identify subclinical manifestations of insomnia in a language simpler than the Athens Insomnia Scale and more suitable for self-report. It uses four items to assess sleep problems and three items to assess impaired daytime functioning.

A medical history and a physical examination can identify other conditions that could be the cause of insomnia. A comprehensive sleep history should include sleep habits and sleep environment, medications (prescription and non-prescription, including supplements), alcohol, nicotine, and caffeine intake, and co-morbid illnesses. A sleep diary can be used to track time to bed, total sleep time, time to sleep onset, number of awakenings, use of medications, time of awakening, and subjective feelings in the morning. The sleep diary can be replaced or validated by the use of out-patient actigraphy for a week or more, using a non-invasive device that measures movement.

Not everyone who suffers from insomnia should routinely have a polysomnography study to screen for sleep disorders, but it may be indicated for those with risk factors for sleep apnea, including obesity, a thick neck diameter, or fullness of the flesh in the oropharynx. For most people, the test is not needed to make a diagnosis, and insomnia can often be treated by changing their schedule to make time for sufficient sleep and by improving sleep hygiene.

Some patients may need an overnight sleep study in a sleep lab. Such a study will commonly involve assessment tools including a polysomnogram and the multiple sleep latency test. Specialists in sleep medicine are qualified to diagnose disorders according to the ICSD, 81 major sleep disorder diagnostic categories. Patients with some disorders, including delayed sleep phase disorder, are often misdiagnosed with primary insomnia; when a person has trouble getting to sleep and awakening at desired times, but has a normal sleep pattern once asleep, a circadian rhythm disorder is a likely cause.

In many cases, insomnia is co-morbid with another disease, side effects from medications, or a psychological problem. Approximately half of all diagnosed insomnia is related to psychiatric disorders. For those who have depression, "insomnia should be regarded as a co-morbid condition, rather than as a secondary one;" insomnia typically predates psychiatric symptoms. "In fact, it is possible that insomnia represents a significant risk for the development of a subsequent psychiatric disorder." Insomnia occurs in between 60% and 80% of people with depression and can be a side effect of medications that treat depression.

The determination of causation is not necessary for a diagnosis.

=== Types ===
Insomnia can be classified as transient, acute, or chronic.

- Transient insomnia lasts for less than a week. It can be caused by another disorder, by changes in the sleep environment, by the timing of sleep, severe depression, or by stress. Its consequences – sleepiness and impaired psychomotor performance – are similar to those of sleep deprivation.
- Acute insomnia is the inability to consistently sleep well for less than a month. Insomnia is present when there is difficulty initiating or maintaining sleep or when the sleep that is obtained is non-refreshing or of poor quality. These problems occur despite adequate opportunity and circumstances for sleep, and they must result in problems with daytime function. Hyperarousal can be linked to acute insomnia since it activates the body's fight-or-flight response. When we encounter stress or danger, our bodies naturally become more alert, which can interfere with our capacity to both fall asleep and remain asleep. This heightened state of arousal can be useful in the short term during threatening situations, but if it continues over an extended period, it can result in acute insomnia. Acute insomnia is also known as short term insomnia or stress related insomnia.
- Chronic insomnia lasts for longer than a month. It can be caused by another disorder, or it can be a primary disorder. Common causes of chronic insomnia include persistent stress, trauma, work schedules, poor sleep habits, medications, and other mental health disorders. When an individual consistently engages in behaviors that disrupt their sleep, such as irregular sleep schedules, spending excessive time awake in bed, or engaging in stimulating activities close to bedtime, it can lead to conditioned wakefulness contributing to chronic insomnia. People with high levels of stress hormones or shifts in the levels of cytokines are more likely than others to have chronic insomnia. Its effects can vary according to its causes. They might include muscular weariness, hallucinations, and/or mental fatigue.

== Prevention ==
Prevention and treatment of insomnia may require a combination of cognitive behavioral therapy, medications, and lifestyle changes.

Among lifestyle practices, going to sleep and waking up at the same time each day can create a steady pattern which may help to prevent insomnia. Avoidance of vigorous exercise and caffeinated drinks a few hours before going to sleep is recommended, while exercise earlier in the day may be beneficial. Other practices to improve sleep hygiene may include:

- Avoiding or limiting naps
- Treating pain at bedtime
- Avoiding large meals, beverages, alcohol, and nicotine before bedtime
- Finding soothing ways to relax into sleep, including the use of white noise
- Making the bedroom suitable for sleep by keeping it dark, cool, and free of devices, such as clocks, cell phones, or televisions
- Maintain regular exercise
- Try relaxing activities before sleeping
- Reading before sleep should preferably be done in a chair or another room

== Management ==
It is recommended to rule out medical and psychological causes before deciding on the treatment for insomnia. Cognitive behavioral therapy is an effective first-line treatment for chronic insomnia. The beneficial effects, in contrast to those produced by medications, may last well beyond the stopping of therapy.

Medications have been used mainly to reduce symptoms in insomnia of short duration; their role in the management of chronic insomnia remains unclear. Several different types of medications may be used. Many doctors do not recommend relying on prescription sleeping pills for long-term use. These medications are not recommended for more than four or five weeks, although they can be used longer in certain instances. It is also important to identify and treat other medical conditions that may be contributing to insomnia, such as depression, breathing problems, and chronic pain. As of 2022, many people with insomnia were reported as not receiving overall sufficient sleep or treatment for insomnia.

=== Non-medication based ===
Non-medication-based strategies have comparable efficacy to hypnotic medication for insomnia, and they may have longer-lasting effects. Hypnotic medication is only recommended for short-term use because dependence with rebound withdrawal effects upon discontinuation or tolerance can develop.

Non-medication-based strategies provide long-lasting improvements to insomnia and are recommended as a first-line and long-term strategy of management. Behavioral sleep medicine offers non-medication strategies to address chronic insomnia including sleep hygiene, stimulus control, behavioral interventions, sleep-restriction therapy, paradoxical intention, patient education, and relaxation therapy. Some examples are keeping a journal, restricting the time spent awake in bed, practicing relaxation techniques, and maintaining a regular sleep schedule and a wake-up time. Behavioral therapy can assist a patient in developing new sleep behaviors to improve sleep quality and consolidation. Behavioral therapy may include learning healthy sleep habits to promote sleep relaxation, undergoing light therapy to regulate the circadian rhythm, and regulating the circadian clock.

Music may improve insomnia in adults (see music and sleep). EEG biofeedback has demonstrated effectiveness in the treatment of insomnia with improvements in duration as well as the quality of sleep. Self-help therapy (defined as a psychological therapy that can be worked through on one's own) may improve sleep quality for adults with insomnia to a small or moderate degree.

Stimulus control therapy is a treatment for patients who have conditioned themselves to associate the bed or sleep in general with a negative response. As stimulus control therapy involves taking steps to control the sleep environment, it is sometimes referred to interchangeably with the concept of sleep hygiene. Examples of such environmental modifications include using the bed for sleep and sex only, not for activities such as reading or watching television; waking up at the same time every morning, including on weekends; going to bed only when sleepy and when there is a high likelihood that sleep will occur; leaving the bed and beginning an activity in another location if sleep does not occur in a reasonably brief period after getting into bed (commonly ~20 min); reducing the subjective effort and energy expended trying to fall asleep; avoiding exposure to bright light during night-time hours, and eliminating daytime naps.

A component of stimulus control therapy is sleep restriction, a technique that aims to match the time spent in bed with the actual time spent asleep. This technique involves maintaining a strict sleep-wake schedule, sleeping only at certain times of the day and for specific amounts of time to induce mild sleep deprivation. Complete treatment usually lasts up to 3 weeks and involves making oneself sleep for only a minimum amount of time that they are actually capable of on average, and then, if capable (i.e. when sleep efficiency improves), slowly increasing this amount (~15 min) by going to bed earlier as the body attempts to reset its internal sleep clock. Bright light therapy may be effective for insomnia.

Paradoxical intention is a cognitive reframing technique where the insomniac, instead of attempting to fall asleep at night, makes every effort to stay awake (i.e., essentially stops trying to fall asleep). One theory that may explain the effectiveness of this method is that by not voluntarily making oneself go to sleep, it relieves the performance anxiety that arises from the need or requirement to fall asleep, which is meant to be a passive act. This technique has been shown to reduce sleep effort and performance anxiety and also lower subjective assessment of sleep-onset latency and overestimation of the sleep deficit (a quality found in many insomniacs).

==== Sleep Hygiene ====
Sleep hygiene is a common term for all of the behaviors that relate to the promotion of good sleep. They include habits that provide a good foundation for sleep and help to prevent insomnia. However, sleep hygiene alone may not be adequate to address chronic insomnia. Sleep hygiene recommendations are typically included as one component of cognitive behavioral therapy for insomnia (CBT-I). Recommendations include reducing caffeine, nicotine, and alcohol consumption, maximizing the regularity and efficiency of sleep episodes, minimizing medication usage and daytime napping, the promotion of regular exercise, and the facilitation of a positive sleep environment. The creation of a positive sleep environment may also help reduce the symptoms of insomnia. On the other hand, a systematic review by the AASM concluded that clinicians should not prescribe sleep hygiene for insomnia due to the evidence of absence of its efficacy and potential delaying of adequate treatment, recommending instead that effective therapies such as CBT-i should be preferred.

==== Cognitive behavioral therapy ====
There is some evidence that cognitive behavioral therapy for insomnia (CBT-I) is superior not only in the long-term, but also in the short-term (2 months) to benzodiazepines and the nonbenzodiazepines in the treatment and management of insomnia. In this therapy, patients are taught improved sleep habits and relieved of counter-productive assumptions about sleep. The beliefs addressed in this therapy fall into four domains, as measured by the Dysfunctional Beliefs and Attitudes about Sleep scale:

- Unrealistic expectations of sleep.
- Beliefs about the consequences of insomnia.
- Worry and helplessness about sleeping badly.
- Beliefs about sleep medication.

Numerous studies have reported positive outcomes of combining cognitive behavioral therapy for insomnia treatment with treatments such as stimulus control and relaxation therapies. Hypnotic medications are equally effective in the short-term treatment of insomnia, but their effects wear off over time due to tolerance. The effects of CBT-I have sustained and lasting effects on treating insomnia long after therapy has been discontinued. The addition of hypnotic medications with CBT-I adds no benefit in insomnia. The long-lasting benefits of a course of CBT-I shows superiority over pharmacological hypnotic drugs. Even in the short term, when compared to short-term hypnotic medication such as zolpidem, CBT-I still shows significant superiority. Thus, CBT-I is recommended as a first-line treatment for insomnia.

Common forms of CBT-I treatments include stimulus control therapy, sleep restriction, sleep hygiene, improved sleeping environments, relaxation training, paradoxical intention, and biofeedback. Sleep restriction (also called "time-in-bed restriction"), stimulus control and cognitive restructuring are key components.

CBT is a well-accepted form of therapy for insomnia since it has no known adverse effects, whereas taking medications to alleviate insomnia symptoms has been shown to have adverse side effects. Nevertheless, the downside of CBT is that it may take a lot of time and motivation.

==== Acceptance and commitment therapy ====
Treatments based on the principles of acceptance and commitment therapy (ACT) and metacognition have emerged as alternative approaches to treating insomnia. ACT rejects the idea that behavioral changes can help insomniacs achieve better sleep since they require "sleep efforts" - actions which create more "struggle" and arouse the nervous system, leading to hyperarousal. The ACT approach posits that acceptance of the negative feelings associated with insomnia can, in time, create the right conditions for sleep. Mindfulness practice is a key feature of this approach, although mindfulness is not practiced to induce sleep (this in itself is a sleep effort to be avoided) but rather as a longer-term activity to help calm the nervous system and create the internal conditions from which sleep can emerge.

A key distinction between CBT-I and ACT lies in the divergent approaches to time spent awake in bed. Proponents of CBT-i advocate minimizing time spent awake in bed, on the basis that this creates a cognitive association between being in bed and wakefulness. The ACT approach proposes that avoiding time in bed may increase the pressure to sleep and arouse the nervous system further.

Research has shown that "ACT has a significant effect on primary and comorbid insomnia and sleep quality, and ... can be used as an appropriate treatment method to control and improve insomnia".

==== Internet Interventions ====
Despite the therapeutic effectiveness and proven success of CBT, treatment availability is significantly limited by a lack of trained clinicians, poor geographical distribution of knowledgeable professionals, and expense. One way to potentially overcome these barriers is to use the Internet to deliver treatment, making this effective intervention more accessible and less costly. The Internet has already become a critical source of health care and medical information. Although the vast majority of health websites provide general information, there is growing research literature on the development and evaluation of Internet interventions.

These online programs are typically behaviorally based treatments that have been operationalized and transformed for delivery via the Internet. They are usually highly structured, automated, or human-supported, based on effective face-to-face treatment; personalized to the user; interactive; enhanced by graphics, animations, audio, and possibly video; and tailored to provide follow-up and feedback.

There is good evidence for the use of computer-based CBT for insomnia.

=== Medications ===
Many people with insomnia use sleeping tablets and other sedatives. In some places, medications are prescribed in over 95% of cases. They, however, are a second line treatment. In 2019, the US Food and Drug Administration (FDA) stated it is going to require warnings for eszopiclone, zaleplon, and zolpidem, due to concerns about serious injuries resulting from abnormal sleep behaviors, including sleepwalking or driving a vehicle while asleep.

The percentage of adults using a prescription sleep aid increases with age. During 2005–2010, about 4% of US adults aged 20 and over reported that they took prescription sleep aids in the past 30 days. Rates of use were lowest among the youngest age group (those aged 20–39) at about 2%, increased to 6% among those aged 50–59, and reached 7% among those aged 80 and over. More adult women (5%) reported using prescription sleep aids than adult men (3%). Non-Hispanic white adults reported higher use of sleep aids (5%) than non-Hispanic black (3%) and Mexican-American (2%) adults. No difference was shown between non-Hispanic black adults and Mexican-American adults in use of prescription sleep aids.

==== Antihistamines ====
As an alternative to taking prescription drugs, some evidence shows that an average person seeking short-term help may find relief by taking over-the-counter antihistamines such as diphenhydramine or doxylamine. Diphenhydramine and doxylamine are widely used in nonprescription sleep aids. They are the most effective over-the-counter sedatives currently available, at least in much of Europe, Canada, Australia, and the United States, and are more sedating than some prescription hypnotics. Antihistamine effectiveness for sleep may decrease over time, and anticholinergic side-effects (such as dry mouth) may also be a drawback with these particular drugs. While addiction does not seem to be an issue with this class of drugs, they can induce dependence and rebound effects upon abrupt cessation of use. However, people whose insomnia is caused by restless legs syndrome may have worsened symptoms with antihistamines.

==== Antidepressants ====
While insomnia is a common symptom of depression, antidepressants are effective for treating sleep problems whether or not they are associated with depression. While all antidepressants help regulate sleep, some antidepressants, such as amitriptyline, doxepin, mirtazapine, trazodone, and trimipramine, can have an immediate sedative effect and are prescribed to treat insomnia. Trazodone was at the beginning of the 2020s the most prescribed drug for sleep in the United States despite not being indicated for sleep.

Amitriptyline, doxepin, and trimipramine all have antihistaminergic, anticholinergic, antiadrenergic, and antiserotonergic properties, which contribute to both their therapeutic effects and side effect profiles, while mirtazapine's actions are primarily antihistaminergic and antiserotonergic and trazodone's effects are primarily antiadrenergic and antiserotonergic. Mirtazapine is known to decrease sleep latency (i.e., the time it takes to fall asleep), promoting sleep efficiency and increasing the total amount of sleeping time in people with both depression and insomnia.

Agomelatine, a melatonergic antidepressant with claimed sleep-improving qualities that does not cause daytime drowsiness, is approved for the treatment of depression though not sleep conditions in the European Union and Australia. After trials in the United States, its development for use there was discontinued in October 2011 by Novartis, who had bought the rights to market it there from the European pharmaceutical company Servier.

A 2018 Cochrane review found the safety of taking antidepressants for insomnia to be uncertain with no evidence supporting long term use.

==== Melatonin agonists ====
Melatonin receptor agonists such as melatonin and ramelteon are used in the treatment of insomnia. Prolonged-release melatonin improves insomnia mainly in adults ≥55, and ramelteon improves sleep generally, with both effective versus placebo but less effective than most licensed insomnia drugs and showing limited long-term benefits.

The usage of melatonin as a treatment for insomnia in adults has increased from 0.4% between 1999 and 2000 to nearly 2.1% between 2017 and 2018.

While the use of melatonin in the short term has been proven to be generally safe and is shown not to be a dependent medication, side effects can still occur.

Most common side effects of melatonin include:

- Headache
- Dizziness
- Nausea
- Daytime drowsiness

Studies have also shown that children who have an autism spectrum disorder or a learning disability, such as attention deficit hyperactivity disorder (ADHD) or related neurological diseases, can benefit from the use of melatonin. This is because they often have trouble sleeping due to their disorders. For example, children with ADHD tend to have trouble falling asleep because of their hyperactivity and, as a result, tend to be tired during most of the day. Another cause of insomnia in children with ADHD is the use of stimulants to treat their disorder. Children who have ADHD, as well as the other disorders mentioned, may be given melatonin before bedtime to help them sleep.

==== Benzodiazepines ====
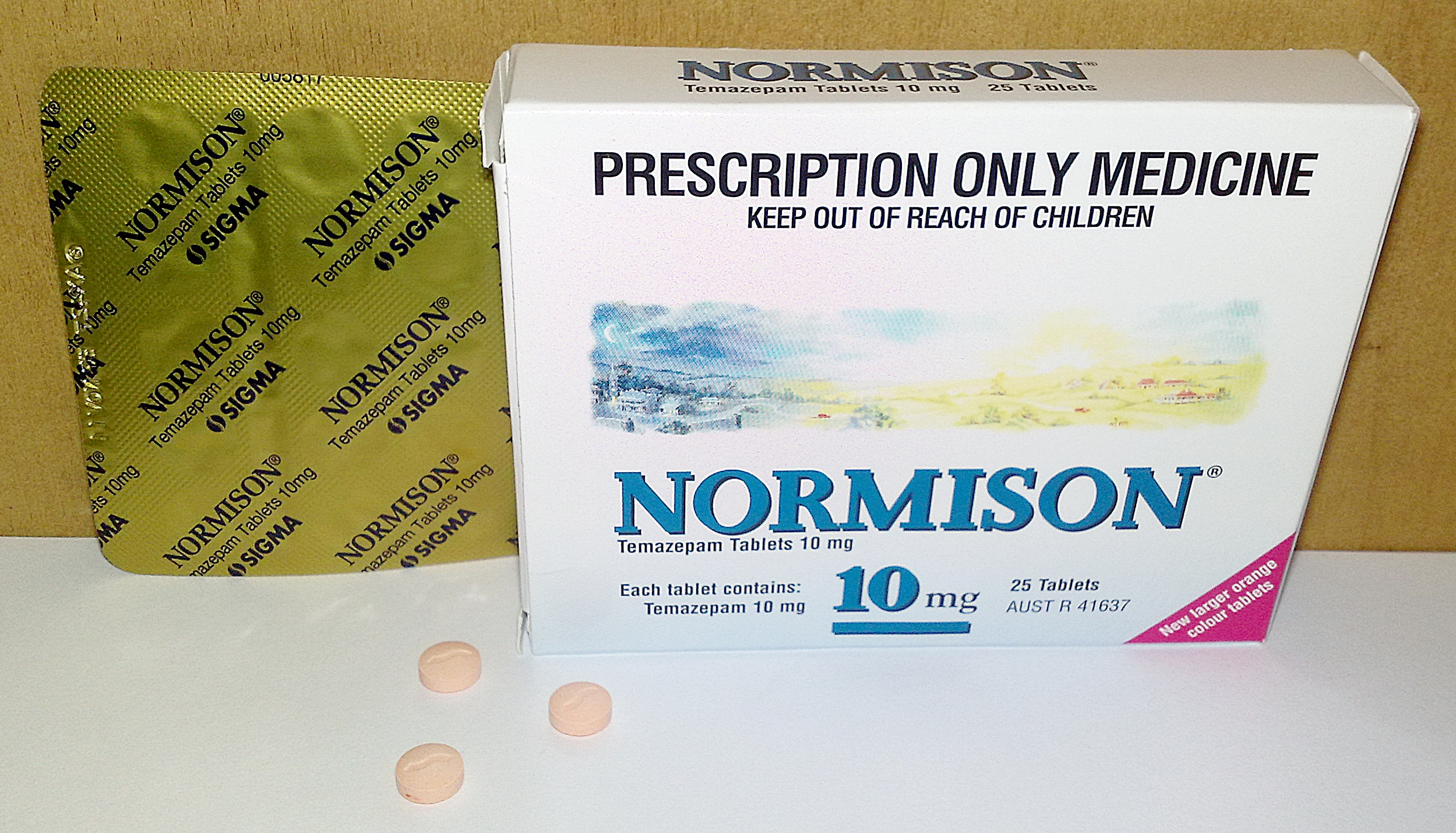
Normison (temazepam) is a benzodiazepine commonly prescribed for insomnia and other sleep disorders.

The most commonly used class of hypnotics for insomnia are the benzodiazepines. Benzodiazepines are not significantly better for insomnia than antidepressants. Chronic users of hypnotic medications for insomnia do not have better sleep than chronic insomniacs not taking medications. In fact, chronic users of hypnotic medications have more regular night-time awakenings than insomniacs not taking hypnotic medications. Many have concluded that these drugs cause an unjustifiable risk to the individual and to public health and lack evidence of long-term effectiveness. It is preferred that hypnotics be prescribed for only a few days at the lowest effective dose and avoided altogether wherever possible, especially in the elderly. Between 1993 and 2010, the prescribing of benzodiazepines to individuals with sleep disorders has decreased from 24% to 11% in the US, coinciding with the first release of nonbenzodiazepines.

The benzodiazepine and nonbenzodiazepine hypnotic medications also have several side effects, such as daytime fatigue, motor vehicle crashes and other accidents, cognitive impairments, and falls and fractures. Elderly people are more sensitive to these side effects. Some benzodiazepines have demonstrated effectiveness in sleep maintenance in the short term but in the longer term benzodiazepines can lead to tolerance, physical dependence, benzodiazepine withdrawal syndrome upon discontinuation, and long-term worsening of sleep, especially after consistent usage over long periods. Benzodiazepines, while inducing unconsciousness, actually worsen sleep as – like alcohol – they promote light sleep while decreasing time spent in deep sleep. A further problem is, with regular use of short-acting sleep aids for insomnia, daytime rebound anxiety can emerge. Although there is little evidence for benefit of benzodiazepines in insomnia compared to other treatments and evidence of major harm, prescriptions have continued to increase. This is likely due to their addictive nature, both due to misuse and because – through their rapid action, tolerance and withdrawal they can "trick" insomniacs into thinking they are helping with sleep. There is a general awareness that long-term use of benzodiazepines for insomnia in most people is inappropriate and that a gradual withdrawal is usually beneficial due to the adverse effects associated with the long-term use of benzodiazepines and is recommended whenever possible.

Benzodiazepines all bind unselectively to the GABA_{A} receptor. Some theorize that certain benzodiazepines (hypnotic benzodiazepines) have significantly higher activity at the α_{1} subunit of the GABA_{A} receptor compared to other benzodiazepines (for example, triazolam and temazepam have significantly higher activity at the α_{1} subunit compared to alprazolam and diazepam, making them superior sedative–hypnotics – alprazolam and diazepam, in turn, have higher activity at the α_{2} subunit compared to triazolam and temazepam, making them superior anxiolytic agents). Modulation of the α_{1} subunit is associated with sedation, motor impairment, respiratory depression, amnesia, ataxia, and reinforcing behavior (drug-seeking behavior). Modulation of the α_{2} subunit is associated with anxiolytic activity and disinhibition. For this reason, certain benzodiazepines may be better suited to treat insomnia than others.

==== Z-Drugs ====
Nonbenzodiazepine or Z-drug sedative–hypnotic drugs, such as zolpidem, zaleplon, zopiclone, and eszopiclone, are a class of hypnotic medications that are similar to benzodiazepines in their mechanism of action, and indicated for mild to moderate insomnia. Their effectiveness at improving time to sleeping is slight, and they have similar – though potentially less severe – side effect profiles compared to benzodiazepines. Prescribing of nonbenzodiazepines has seen a general increase since their initial release on the US market in 1992, from 2.3% in 1993 among individuals with sleep disorders to 13.7% in 2010.

==== Orexin antagonists ====
Orexin receptor antagonists are a more recently introduced class of sleep medications and include suvorexant, lemborexant, and daridorexant, all of which are FDA-approved for treatment of insomnia characterized by difficulties with sleep onset and/or sleep maintenance. They are oriented towards blocking signals in the brain that stimulate wakefulness, therefore claiming to address insomnia without creating dependence. There are three dual orexin receptor antagonist (DORA) drugs on the market: Belsomra (Merck), Dayvigo (Eisai) and Quviviq (Idorsia).

==== Antipsychotics ====
Certain atypical antipsychotics, particularly quetiapine, olanzapine, and risperidone, are used in the treatment of insomnia. However, while common, the use of antipsychotics for this indication is not recommended as the evidence does not demonstrate a benefit, and the risk of adverse effects is significant. A major 2022 systematic review and network meta-analysis of medications for insomnia in adults found that quetiapine did not demonstrate any short-term benefits for insomnia. Some of the more serious adverse effects may also occur at the low doses used, such as dyslipidemia and neutropenia. Such concerns of risks at low doses are supported by Danish observational studies that showed an association of use of low-dose quetiapine (excluding prescriptions filled for tablet strengths >50 mg) with an increased risk of major cardiovascular events as compared to use of Z-drugs, with most of the risk being driven by cardiovascular death. Laboratory data from an unpublished analysis of the same cohort also support the lack of dose-dependency of metabolic side effects, as new use of low-dose quetiapine was associated with a risk of increased fasting triglycerides at one-year follow-up. Concerns regarding side effects are greater in the elderly.

==== Other sedatives ====
Gabapentinoids like gabapentin and pregabalin have sleep-promoting effects, but are not commonly used for the treatment of insomnia. Gabapentin is not effective in helping alcohol-related insomnia.

Barbiturates, while once used, are no longer recommended for insomnia due to the risk of addiction and other side effects.

==== Comparative effectiveness ====
Medications for the treatment of insomnia have a wide range of effect sizes. When comparing drugs such as benzodiazepines, Z-drugs, sedative antidepressants and antihistamines, quetiapine, orexin receptor antagonists, and melatonin receptor agonists, the orexin antagonist lemborexant and the Z-drug eszopiclone had the best profiles overall in terms of efficacy, tolerability, and acceptability.

=== Alternative medicine ===
Herbal products, such as valerian, kava, chamomile, and lavender, have been used to treat insomnia. However, there is no quality evidence that they are effective and safe. The same is true for cannabis and cannabinoids.

Acupuncture is often promoted for insomnia, but evidence for its effectiveness is mixed. It is unclear whether acupuncture is helpful for treating insomnia in the general population. In people with cancer, acupuncture may reduce insomnia severity and improve sleep quality, though its effects are often similar to those of sham acupuncture. While acupuncture can help alleviate insomnia and enhance sleep, it is generally less effective than cognitive behavioural therapy for insomnia (CBT-I).

== Prognosis ==
Disability-adjusted life year for insomnia per 100,000 inhabitants in 2004: no data less than 25 25–30.25 30.25–36 36–41.5 41.5–47 47–52.5 52.5–58 58–63.5 63.5–69 69–74.5 74.5–80 more than 80

A survey of 1.1 million residents in the United States found that those who reported sleeping about 7 hours per night had the lowest rates of mortality, whereas those who slept for fewer than 6 hours or more than 8 hours had higher mortality rates. Severe insomnia—sleeping less than 3.5 hours in women and 4.5 hours in men—is associated with a 15% increase in mortality, while getting 8.5 or more hours of sleep per night was associated with a 15% higher mortality rate.

With this technique, it is difficult to distinguish the lack of sleep caused by a disorder, which is also a cause of premature death, versus a disorder that causes a lack of sleep, and the lack of sleep, causing premature death. Most of the increase in mortality from severe insomnia was discounted after controlling for associated disorders. After controlling for sleep duration and insomnia, the use of sleeping pills was also found to be associated with an increased mortality rate.

The lowest mortality was seen in individuals who slept between six and a half and seven and a half hours nightly. Even sleeping only 4.5 hours per night is associated with a very small increase in mortality. Thus, mild to moderate insomnia for most people is associated with increased longevity, and severe insomnia is associated only with a very small effect on mortality. It is unclear why sleeping longer than 7.5 hours is associated with excess mortality.

== Epidemiology ==
Between 10% and 30% of adults have insomnia at any given point in time and up to half of people have insomnia in a given year, making it the most common sleep disorder. About 6% of people have insomnia that is not due to another problem and lasts for more than a month. People over the age of 65 are affected more often than younger people. Females are more often affected than males. Insomnia is 40% more common in women than in men.

There are higher rates of insomnia reported among university students compared to the general population.

== Society and culture ==
The word insomnia is from Latin: in + somnus "without sleep" and -ia as a nominalizing suffix.

The popular press have published stories about people who supposedly never sleep, such as that of Thái Ngọc and Al Herpin. Horne writes "everybody sleeps and needs to do so", and generally this appears true. However, he also relates from contemporary accounts the case of Paul Kern, who was shot in 1915 fighting in World War I and then "never slept again" until he died in 1955. Kern appears to be a completely isolated, unique case.
