= Film coating =

Thin polymer-based coat applied to solid dosage forms

A film coating is a thin polymer-based coat that is typically sprayed onto solid pharmaceutical dosage forms, such as tablets, capsules, pellets or granules. Film coating can impact both its appearance and its pharmacokinetics making it an essential process in making the final drug product.

Film coatings are the most common form of drug coating and are generally applied in orally-administered pharmaceuticals. The motivation for applying film coatings to dosage forms range from cosmetic considerations (colour, gloss and branding), improving the shelf life by providing a protective barrier between the drug and the surrounding environment. These types of film coatings are known as non-functional film coatings. They may also be used to delay or augment the delivery and uptake of medications or delay release and uptake until the medication passes through the stomach. These types of film coatings are known as functional film coatings.

== Process ==
The conventional method of applying film coatings to oral dosage forms comprises a spraying phase and a drying phase. The spraying phase consists of applying a layer of a polymer, plasticizer, colourant, opacifier, solvent, and a vehicle to the oral dosage form's core. Once applied, the oral dosage form is dried by passing hot air over the dosage form, which typically also removes the solvent as well. The final result is a thin film coating with the desired plasticizer, colour, opacifier, and vehicle.

== Properties ==
=== Non-functional coating ===
Non-functional film coating involves changes made to the aesthetic of the oral dosage form. Such changes affect an oral dosage form's appearance, organoleptic properties, swallowing properties, and provide protection against harsh environmental conditions that can damage the active pharmaceutical ingredient. These changes are conducted to improve the compliance and effects of the oral dosage form. For instance, changing appearance can be done by changing the colour of the drug, leading to a more appealing product. Changing the swallowing properties can make it easier for those suffering from dysphagia. Finally, adding a film that protects from harsh environments, such conditions include humidity, oxidation, or light, increases the shelf life of the final product.

=== Functional coating ===
Functional film coating provides the same properties as non-functional film coating, but also has added properties that affect drug release. These changes alter the region in the gastrointestinal tract that the final drug product is released. See modified-release dosage and enteric coatings.

== Types ==
=== Organic solvent-based coating ===
Organic solvent use in film coating is typically used to incorporate protective coatings to the oral dosage form, which aids in increasing the shelf life of the final drug product. This type of film coating can be dangerous due to its potential for toxicity in the final product and flammability during the film coating process. As such, it is integral to have proper safety measures and ventilation in place when film coating.

=== Aqueous coating ===
Aqueous film coating is the most common film coating method currently used. This type of film coating uses water to aid in the film coating process instead of organic solvents. The result is a safer means of film coating, as it avoids the toxic and flammable properties of organic solvents. Aqueous film coating requires the use of water insoluble polymer mixtures, with the addition of a plasticizer. Despite its widespread popularity, aqueous film coating is more time consuming than organic solvent-based coating, due to the increased time needed for complete evaporation of water.

=== Solvent-free coating ===
Solvent-free film coating is most commonly used in coating heat sensitive drugs due to the benefit of not requiring a drying phase. The end result of this type of film coating is an inert film coating that does not react with the active pharmaceutical ingredients. Some methods to create a solvent-free film coating include injection molding coating, hot-melt coating, and spray congealing. Each method has its own advantages and disadvantages, but the common theme amongst them is the need for very precise conditions that can satisfactorily apply a film coating to the oral dosage form. As such, it is an inefficient type of film coating that has resulted in its lack of widespread use.

It is also possible to use resonant acoustic mixing to apply a coating, which avoids many of the issues seen with hot-melt coating.

== See also ==
- UV coating
- Lamination
