= Sleep onset =

Transition from wakefulness into sleep

Sleep onset is the transition from wakefulness into sleep. Sleep onset usually transits into non-rapid eye movement sleep (NREM sleep) but under certain circumstances (e.g. narcolepsy) it is possible to transit from wakefulness directly into rapid eye movement sleep (REM sleep).

== History ==
During the 1920s an obscure disorder that caused encephalitis and attacked the part of the brain that regulates sleep influenced Europe and North America. Although the virus that caused this disorder was never identified, the psychiatrist and neurologist Constantin von Economo decided to study this disease and identified a key component in the sleep-wake regulation. He identified the pathways that regulated wakefulness and sleep onset by studying the parts of the brain that were affected by the disease and the consequences it had on the circadian rhythm. He stated that the pathways that regulated sleep onset are located between the brain stem and the basal forebrain. His discoveries were not appreciated until the last two decades of the 20th century when the pathways of sleep were found to reside in the exact place that Constantin von Economo stated.

== Neural circuit ==
Sleep electrophysiological measurements can be made by attaching electrodes to the scalp to measure the electroencephalogram (EEG) and to the chin to monitor muscle activity, recorded as the electromyogram (EMG). Electrodes attached around the eyes monitor eye movements, recorded as the electro-oculogram (EOG).

=== Pathways ===
Von Economo, in his studies, noticed that lesions in the connection between the midbrain and the diencephalon caused prolonged sleepiness and therefore proposed the idea of an ascending arousal system. During the past few decades major ascending pathways have been discovered with located neurons and respective neurotransmitters. This pathway divides into two branches: one that ascends to the thalamus and activates the thalamus relay neurons, and another one that activates neurons in the lateral part of the hypothalamus and the basal forebrain, and throughout the cerebral cortex. This refers to the ascending reticular activating system (cf reticular formation). The cell group involved in the first pathway is an acetylcholine-producing cell group called pedunculopontine and laterodorsal tegmental nucleus. These neurons play a crucial role in bridging information in between the thalamus and the cerebral cortex. These neurons have high activation during wakefulness and during REM sleep and a low activation during NREM sleep. The second branch originates from monoaminorgenic neurons. These neurons are located in the locus coeruleus, dorsal and median raphe nuclei, ventral periaqueductal grey matter, and tuberomammillary nucleus. Each group produces a different neurotransmitter. The neurons in the locus coeruleus produce noradrenaline, as fore the neurons in the dorsal and median raphe nuclei, ventral periaqueductal grey matter, and tuberomammillary nucleus produce serotonin, dopamine and histamine respectively. They then project onto the hypothalamic peptidergic neurons, which contain melanin-concentrated hormones or orexin, and basal forebrain neurons which contain GABA and acetylcholine. These neurons then project onto the cerebral cortex. It has also been discovered that lesions to this part of the brain cause prolonged sleep or may produce coma.

=== Lesions ===
Some light was thrown on the mechanisms on sleep onset by the discovery that lesions in the preoptic area and anterior hypothalamus lead to insomnia while those in the posterior hypothalamus lead to sleepiness. Further research has shown that the hypothalamic region called ventrolateral preoptic nucleus produces the inhibitory neurotransmitter GABA that inhibits the arousal system during sleep onset.

=== Direct mechanism ===
Sleep onset is induced by sleep-promoting neurons, located in the ventrolateral preoptic nucleus (VLPO). The sleep-promoting neurons are believed to project GABA type A and galanin, two known inhibitory neurotransmitters, to arousal-promoting neurons, such as histaminergic, serotonergic, orexinergic, noradrenergic, and cholinergic neurons (neurons mentioned above). Levels of acetylcholine, norepinephrine, serotonin, and histamine decrease with the onset of sleep, for they are all wakefulness promoting neurotransmitters. Therefore, it is believed that the activation of sleep-promoting neurons causes the inhibition of arousal-promoting neurons, which leads to sleep. Evidence has shown that during the sleep-wake cycle, sleep-promoting neurons and the arousal-promoting neurons have reciprocal discharges, and that during NREM sleep, GABA receptors increase in the arousal-promoting neurons. This had led some to believe that the increase of GABA receptors in the arousal-promoting neurons is another pathway of inducing sleep.

Adenosine is also known as the sleep promoting nucleoside neuromodulator. Astrocytes maintain a small stock of nutrients in the form of glycogen. In times of increased brain activity, such as during daytime, this glycogen is converted into fuel for neurons; thus, prolonged wakefulness causes a decrease in the level of glycogen in the brain. A fall in the level of glycogen causes an increase in the level of extracellular adenosine, which has an inhibitory effect in neural activity. This accumulation of adenosine serves as a sleep-promoting substance.

The majority of sleep neurons are located in the ventrolateral preoptic area (vlPOA). These sleep neurons are silent until an individual shows a transition from waking to sleep. The sleep neurons in the preoptic area receive inhibitory inputs from some of the same regions they inhibit, including the tubermammillary nucleus, raphe nuclei, and locus coeruleus. Thus, they are inhibited by histamine, serotonin, and norepinepherine. This mutual inhibition may provide the basis for establishing periods of sleep and waking. A reciprocal inhibition also characterizes an electronic circuit known as the flip-flop. A flip-flop can assume one of two states, usually referred to as on or off. Thus, either the sleep neurons are active and inhibit the wakefulness neurons, or the wakefulness neurons are active and inhibit the sleep neurons, Because these regions are mutually inhibitory, it is impossible for neurons in both sets of regions to be active at the same time. This flip-flop, switching from one state to another quickly, can be unstable.

== Stage 1 ==
The sleep cycle is normally defined in stages. When an individual first begins to sleep, stage 1 is entered, marked by the presence of some theta activity, which indicates that the firing of neurons in the neocortex is becoming more synchronized, as well as alpha wave activity (smooth electrical activity of 8–12 Hz recorded from the brain, generally associated with a state of relaxation). This stage is a transition between sleep and wakefulness. This stage is classified as non-REM sleep.

== See also ==
- Sleep onset latency
- Hypnagogia
- Microsleep
- Microarousal
