= Middle-of-the-night insomnia =

Terminal insomnia
- Other names: Sleep maintenance insomnia, nocturnal awakenings, middle-of-the-night awakenings, middle insomnia
- Specialty: Sleep medicine

Middle-of-the-night insomnia, or sleep maintenance insomnia, also called terminal insomnia in contrast with "initial insomnia", is characterized by having difficulty returning to sleep after waking up during the night or very early in the morning. Initial or "sleep-onset" insomnia consists of having difficulty falling asleep at the beginning of sleep.

The disrupted sleep patterns caused by middle-of-the-night insomnia make many sufferers of the condition complain of fatigue the following day. Excessive daytime sleepiness is reported nearly two times higher by individuals with nocturnal awakenings than by people who sleep through the night.

Sleep research conducted in the 1990s showed that such waking up during the night may be a natural sleep pattern, rather than a form of insomnia. If interrupted sleep (called "biphasic sleeping" or "bimodal sleep") is perceived as normal and not referred to as "insomnia", less distress is caused and a return to sleep usually occurs after about one hour.

== Causes ==
- Pain
- Pregnancy
- Anxiety
- Difficulty breathing / sleep apnea
- Urge to urinate or defecate
- Hunger or thirst
- Illness
- Shift work
- Erratic sleep schedule

Nocturnal awakenings are more common in older patients and have been associated with depressive disorders, chronic pain, obstructive sleep apnea, obesity, alcohol consumption, hypertension, gastroesophageal reflux disease, heart disease, menopause, prostate problems, and bipolar disorders. Gastro-intestinal discomfort arising from food that has not been fully cooked, is also a contributor to middle of the night insomnia. Nocturnal awakenings can be mistaken as shift work disorder.

== Treatment ==
Middle-of-the-night insomnia is often treated with medication, although currently Intermezzo (zolpidem tartrate sublingual tablets) is the only Food and Drug Administration-approved medication specifically for treating MOTN awakening. Some studies have shown that zaleplon, which has a short elimination half-life of about 1 hour, may be suitable for middle-of-the-night administration because it does not impair next-day performance. Because most medications usually require 6–8 hours of sleep to avoid lingering effects the next day, these are often used every night at bedtime to prevent awakenings.

Sleep restriction therapy and stimulus control therapy as described in insomnia have shown significance in treating middle of night insomnia.

== Prevalence ==
Waking up in the middle of the night, or nocturnal awakening, is the most frequently reported insomnia symptom, with approximately 35% of Americans over 18 reporting waking up three or more times per week. Of those who experience nocturnal awakenings, 43% report difficulty in resuming sleep after waking, while over 90% report the condition persisting for more than six months. Greater than 50% contend with MOTN conditions for more than five years.

A 2008 "Sleep in America" poll conducted by the National Sleep Foundation found that 42% of respondents awakened during the night at least a few nights a week, and 29% said they woke up too early and couldn't get back to sleep. Other clinical studies have reported between 25% and 35% of people experience nocturnal awakenings at least three nights a week.

== See also ==
- Polyphasic sleep
