= Elimination (pharmacology) =

Processes where a drug is removed or cleared

Diagram illustrating renal flow along the nephron

In pharmacology, the elimination or excretion of a drug is understood to be any one of a number of processes by which a drug is eliminated (that is, cleared and excreted) from an organism either in an unaltered form (unbound molecules) or modified as a metabolite. The kidney is the main excretory organ although others exist such as the liver, the skin, the lungs or glandular structures, such as the salivary glands and the lacrimal glands. These organs or structures use specific routes to expel a drug from the body, these are termed elimination pathways:

- Urine
- Tears
- Perspiration
- Saliva
- Respiration
- Milk
- Faeces
- Bile

Drugs are excreted from the kidney by glomerular filtration and by active tubular secretion following the same steps and mechanisms as the products of intermediate metabolism. Therefore, drugs that are filtered by the glomerulus are also subject to the process of passive tubular reabsorption. Glomerular filtration will only remove those drugs or metabolites that are not bound to proteins present in blood plasma (free fraction) and many other types of drugs (such as the organic acids) are actively secreted. In the proximal and distal convoluted tubules, non-ionised acids and weak bases are reabsorbed both actively and passively. Weak acids are excreted when the tubular fluid becomes too alkaline and this reduces passive reabsorption. The opposite occurs with weak bases. Poisoning treatments use this effect to increase elimination, by alkalizing the urine causing forced diuresis which promotes excretion of a weak acid, rather than it getting reabsorbed. As the acid is ionised, it cannot pass through the plasma membrane back into the blood stream and instead gets excreted with the urine. Acidifying the urine has the same effect for weakly basic drugs.

On other occasions drugs combine with bile juices and enter the intestines. In the intestines the drug will join with the unabsorbed fraction of the administered dose and be eliminated with the faeces or it may undergo a new process of absorption to eventually be eliminated by the kidney.

The other elimination pathways are less important in the elimination of drugs, except in very specific cases, such as the respiratory tract for alcohol or anaesthetic gases. The case of mother's milk is of special importance. The liver and kidneys of newly born infants are relatively undeveloped and they are highly sensitive to a drug's toxic effects. For this reason it is important to know if a drug is likely to be eliminated from a woman's body if she is breast feeding in order to avoid this situation.

== Pharmacokinetic parameters of elimination ==
Pharmacokinetics studies the manner and speed with which drugs and their metabolites are eliminated by the various excretory organs. This elimination will be proportional to the drug's plasmatic concentrations. In order to model these processes a working definition is required for some of the concepts related to excretion.

=== Half life ===
The plasma half-life or half life of elimination is the time required to eliminate 50% of the absorbed dose of a drug from an organism. Or put another way, the time that it takes for the plasma concentration to fall by half from its maximum levels.

=== Clearance ===
The difference in a drug's concentration in arterial blood (before it has circulated around the body) and venous blood (after it has passed through the body's organs) represents the amount of the drug that the body has eliminated or cleared. Although clearance may also involve other organs than the kidney, it is almost synonymous with renal clearance or renal plasma clearance. Clearance is therefore expressed as the plasma volume totally free of the drug per unit of time, and it is measured in units of volume per units of time. Clearance can be determined on an overall, organism level («systemic clearance») or at an organ level (hepatic clearance, renal clearance etc.). The equation that describes this concept is:

$CL_o = Q \cdot \frac{(C_A - C_V)}{C_A}$

Where: $CL_o$ is the organ's clearance rate, $C_A$ is the drug's plasma concentration in arterial blood, $C_V$ is the drug's plasma concentration in venous blood and $Q$ an organ's blood flow.

Each organ will have its own specific clearance conditions, which will relate to its mode of action. The «renal clearance» rate will be determined by factors such as the degree of plasma protein binding as the drug will only be filtered out if it is in the unbound free form, the degree of saturation of the transporters (active secretion depends on transporter proteins that can become saturated) or the number of functioning nephrons (hence the importance of factors such as kidney failure).

As «hepatic clearance» is an active process it is therefore determined by factors that alter an organism's metabolism such as the number of functioning hepatocytes, this is the reason that liver failure has such clinical importance.

== Steady state ==
The steady state or stable concentration is reached when the drug's supply to the blood plasma is the same as the rate of elimination from the plasma. It is necessary to calculate this concentration in order to decide the period between doses and the amount of drug supplied with each dose in prolonged treatments.

== Other parameters ==
Other parameters of interest include a drug's bioavailability and the apparent volume of distribution.
