= Drug liking =

Measure of pleasure associated with drug use

Drug liking is a measure of the pleasurable (hedonic) experience when a person consumes drugs. It is commonly used to study the misuse liability of drugs. Drug liking is often measured using unipolar and bipolar visual analogue scales (VAS), such as the Drug Liking VAS, the High VAS, the Take Drug Again (TDA) VAS, and the Overall Drug Liking (ODL) VAS. There is a dissociation of drug liking from drug wanting (unconscious attribution of incentive salience). Drugs that increase scores on drug-liking measures include amphetamines, cocaine, methylphenidate, MDMA, opioids, benzodiazepines, Z-drugs, barbiturates, alcohol, nicotine, and caffeine (limitedly), among others.
