= Psychoactive drug =

Chemical substance that alters brain function

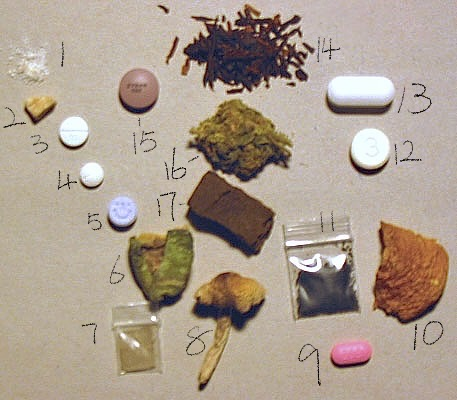
An assortment of commonly used psychoactive drugs, including both street drugs and medications (alcohol and caffeine omitted): 1. Cocaine; 2. Crack cocaine; 3. Methylphenidate (Ritalin); 4. Ephedrine; 5. MDMA (ecstasy); 6. Peyote (mescaline); 7. LSD blotter; 8. Psilocybin mushroom (Psilocybe cubensis); 9. Diphenhydramine (Benadryl) (Unscheduled drug); 10. Amanita muscaria mushroom (muscimol) (Unscheduled drug); 11. Salvia divinorum (salvinorin A); 12. Tylenol 3 (acetaminophen/codeine); 13. Codeine with muscle relaxant; 14. Pipe tobacco (nicotine) (Unscheduled drug); 15. Bupropion (Wellbutrin); 16. Cannabis (THC); 17. Hashish (THC)

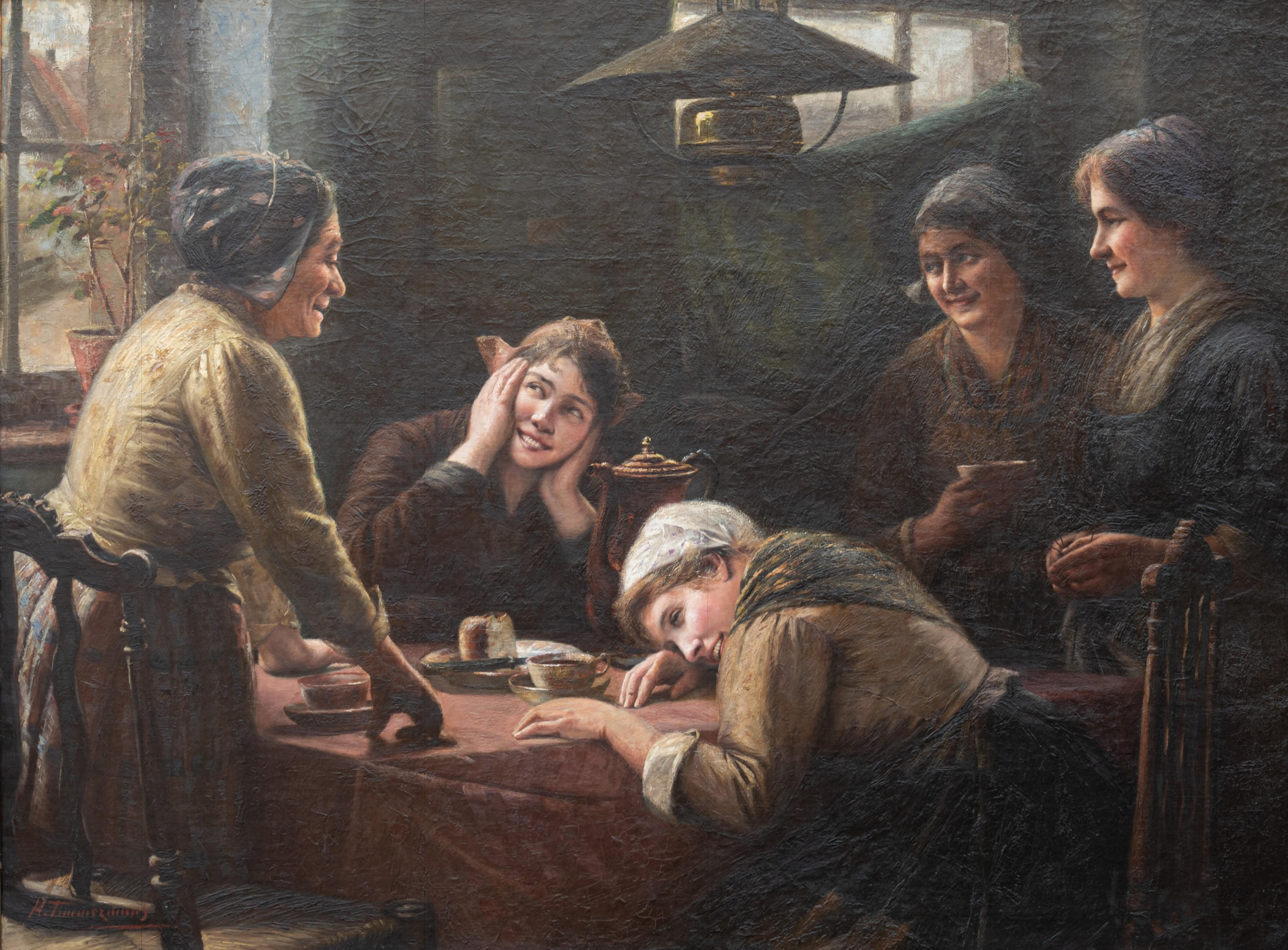
Coffee (containing caffeine) being consumed in a social environment; caffeine is widely legal virtually everywhere worldwide making it the most commonly used psychoactive drug.

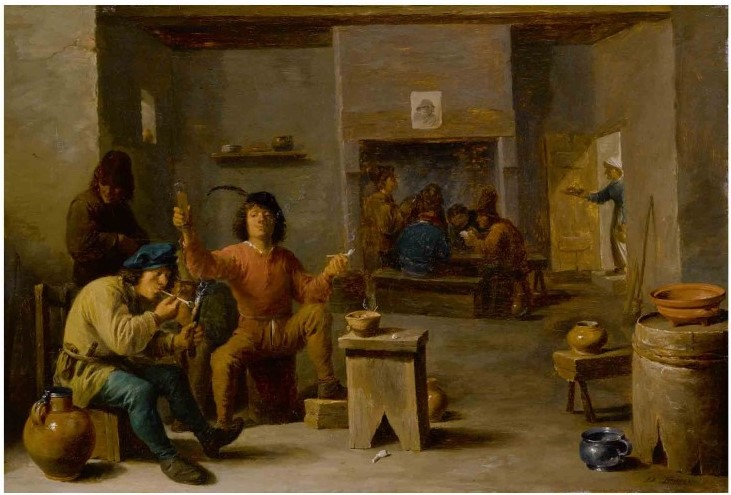
Depiction of alcohol and tobacco (containing nicotine) being used, both of which are commonly legal psychoactive drugs.

Chart of relative harmfulness of some psychoactive substances

A psychoactive drug, psychopharmaceutical, mind-altering drug, consciousness-altering drug, psychoactive substance, or psychotropic substance is a chemical substance that alters psychological functioning by modulating central nervous system (CNS) activity. Psychoactive and psychotropic drugs both affect the brain, with psychotropics sometimes referring to psychiatric drugs or high-abuse substances. Novel psychoactive substances are designer drugs made to mimic illegal ones and bypass laws.

Psychoactive drug use dates back to prehistory for medicinal, recreational, or religious purposes, with evidence of widespread cultural use. Many animals intentionally consume psychoactive substances, and some traditional legends suggest animals first introduced humans to their use. Psychoactive substances are used across cultures for purposes ranging from medicinal and therapeutic treatment of mental disorders and pain, to performance enhancement. Their effects are influenced by the drug itself, the environment, and individual factors. Psychoactive drugs are categorized by their pharmacological effects into types such as anxiolytics (reduce anxiety), entactogens (enhance empathy), stimulants (increase CNS activity), depressants (decrease CNS activity), and hallucinogens (alter perception and emotions). Psychoactive drugs are administered through various routes—including oral ingestion, injection, rectal use, and inhalation—with the method and efficiency differing by drug.

Psychoactive drugs alter brain function by interacting with neurotransmitter systems—either enhancing or inhibiting activity—which can affect mood, perception, cognition, behavior, and potentially lead to dependence or long-term neural adaptations such as sensitization or tolerance. Addiction and dependence involve psychological and physical reliance on psychoactive substances, with treatments ranging from psychotherapy and medication to emerging psychedelic therapies; global prevalence is highest for alcohol, cannabis, and opioid use disorders.

The legality of psychoactive drugs has long been controversial, shaped by international treaties like the 1961 Single Convention on Narcotic Drugs and national laws such as the United States Controlled Substances Act. Distinctions are made between recreational and medical use. Enforcement varies across countries. While the 20th century saw global criminalization, recent shifts favor harm reduction and regulation over prohibition. Widely used psychoactive drugs include typically legal recreational substances like caffeine, alcohol, (Note: Alcohol (or ethanol) is illegal in a minority of countries; see list of countries with alcohol prohibition.) and nicotine; prescription-only medications such as SSRIs, opioids, and benzodiazepines; and typically illegal drugs like cannabis, (Note: Some areas allow medical and/or recreational use of cannabis; see legality of cannabis.) cocaine, and psychedelics.

== History ==
Psychoactive drug use can be traced to prehistory. Archaeological evidence of the use of psychoactive substances, mostly plants, dates back at least 10,000 years; historical evidence indicates cultural use 5,000 years ago. There is evidence of the chewing of coca leaves, for example, in Peruvian society 8,000 years ago.

Psychoactive substances have been used medicinally and to alter consciousness. Consciousness altering may be a primary drive, akin to the need to satiate thirst, hunger, or sexual desire. This may be manifest in the long history of drug use, and even in children's desire for spinning, swinging, or sliding, suggesting that the drive to alter one's state of mind is universal.

In The Hasheesh Eater (1857), American author Fitz Hugh Ludlow was one of the first to describe in modern terms the desire to change one's consciousness through drug use:

[D]rugs are able to bring humans into the neighborhood of divine experience and can thus carry us up from our personal fate and the everyday circumstances of our life into a higher form of reality. It is, however, necessary to understand precisely what is meant by the use of drugs. We do not mean the purely physical craving ... That of which we speak is something much higher, namely the knowledge of the possibility of the soul to enter into a lighter being, and to catch a glimpse of deeper insights and more magnificent visions of the beauty, truth, and the divine than we are normally able to spy through the cracks in our prison cell. But there are not many drugs which have the power of stilling such craving. The entire catalog, at least to the extent that research has thus far written it, may include only opium, hashish, and in rarer cases alcohol, which has enlightening effects only upon very particular characters.

During the 20th century, the majority of countries initially responded to the use of recreational drugs by prohibiting production, distribution, or use through criminalization. A notable example occurred with Prohibition in the United States, where early in the century alcohol was made illegal for 13 years. In recent decades, an emerging perspective among governments and law enforcement holds that illicit drug use cannot be stopped through prohibition. One organization holding that view, Law Enforcement Against Prohibition (LEAP), concluded that "[in] fighting a war on drugs the government has increased the problems of society and made them far worse. A system of regulation rather than prohibition is a less harmful, more ethical and a more effective public policy."

In some countries and localities, there has been a move away from prohibition and towards harm reduction, where the use of illicit drugs is neither condoned nor promoted, but services and support are provided to ensure users have adequate factual information readily available and to minimize, or eliminate, negative effects of their use. Such is the case with Portugal's drug policy of decriminalization and harm reduction, with a primary goal of reducing the adverse health effects of drug use.

== Terminology ==
Psychoactive and psychotropic are often used interchangeably in general and academic sources, to describe substances that act on the brain to alter cognition and perception; some sources make a distinction between the terms. One narrower definition of psychotropic refers to drugs used to treat mental disorders, such as anxiolytic sedatives, antidepressants, antimanic agents, and neuroleptics. Another usage of psychotropic refers to substances determined to pose "high abuse liability", including stimulants, hallucinogens, opioids, and sedatives/hypnotics including alcohol. In international drug control, psychotropic substances refers to the substances specified in the Convention on Psychotropic Substances, which does not include narcotics.

The term "drug" has become a skunked term. "Drugs" can have a negative connotation, often associated with illegal substances like cocaine or heroin, despite the fact that the terms "drug" and "medicine" are sometimes used interchangeably.

Novel psychoactive substances (NPS) (Note: "New Psychoactive Substance", and "Novel Psychoactive Substance" (NPS) are often used interchangeably.), also known as "designer drugs" are a category of psychoactive drugs (substances) that are designed to mimic the effects of often illegal drugs, usually in efforts to circumvent existing drug laws.

== Types ==
Psychoactive drugs are divided according to their pharmacological effects. Common subtypes include:

- Anxiolytics are medicinally used to reduce the symptoms of anxiety, and sometimes insomnia.

Examples: benzodiazepines such as Xanax and Valium; barbiturates

- Entactogens alter emotional state, often resulting in an increased sense of empathy, closeness, and emotional communication.

Example: MDMA (ecstasy), MDA, 6-APB, AMT

- Stimulants increase activity, or arousal, of the central nervous system. They can enhance alertness, attention, cognition, mood and physical performance. Some stimulants are used medicinally to treat individuals with ADHD and narcolepsy.

Examples: amphetamine, caffeine, cocaine, nicotine

- Depressants reduce, or depress, activity and stimulation in the central nervous system. This category encompasses a spectrum of substances with sedative, soporific, and anesthetic properties, and include sedatives, hypnotics, and opioids.

Examples: ethanol (alcohol), opioids such as morphine, fentanyl, and codeine, barbiturates, benzodiazepines, GHB

- Hallucinogens, including psychedelics, dissociatives and deliriants, encompass substances that produce distinct alterations in perception, sensation of space and time, and emotional state.

Examples, psychedelics: psilocybin, LSD, DMT, mescaline
Examples, dissociatives: dextromethorphan, salvinorin A, ketamine
Examples, deliriants: scopolamine, diphenhydramine

== Uses ==
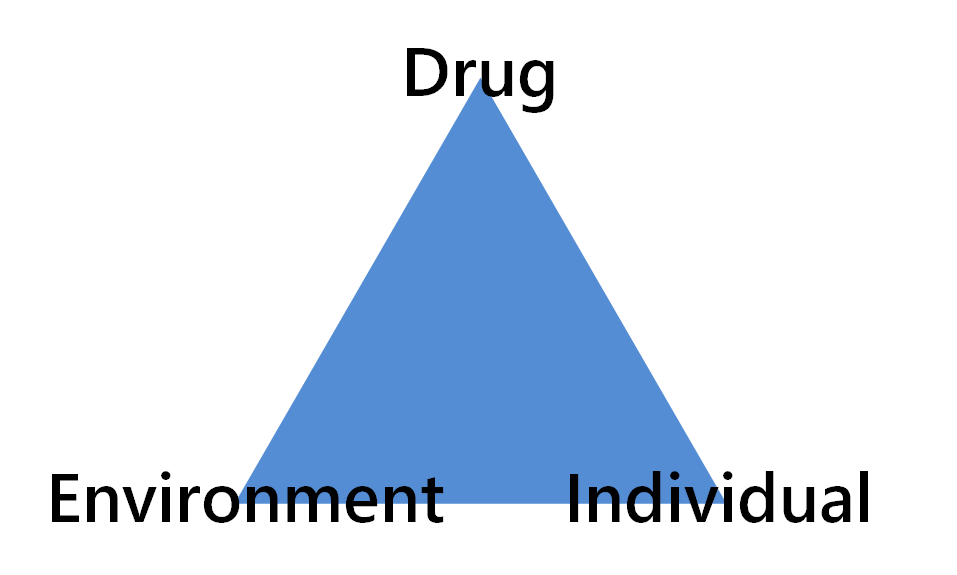
Three key factors influence drug use: the drug (type, strength, availability, etc.), the individual (age, genetics, personality, etc.) and the environment (relatives, poverty, social norms, drug policy, etc.).

The ways in which psychoactive substances are used vary widely between cultures. Some substances may have controlled or illegal uses, others may have shamanic purposes, and others are used medicinally. Examples include social drinking, nootropic supplements, and sleep aids. Caffeine is the world's most widely consumed psychoactive substance, and is legal and unregulated in nearly all jurisdictions; in North America, 90% of adults consume caffeine daily.

=== Mental disorders ===
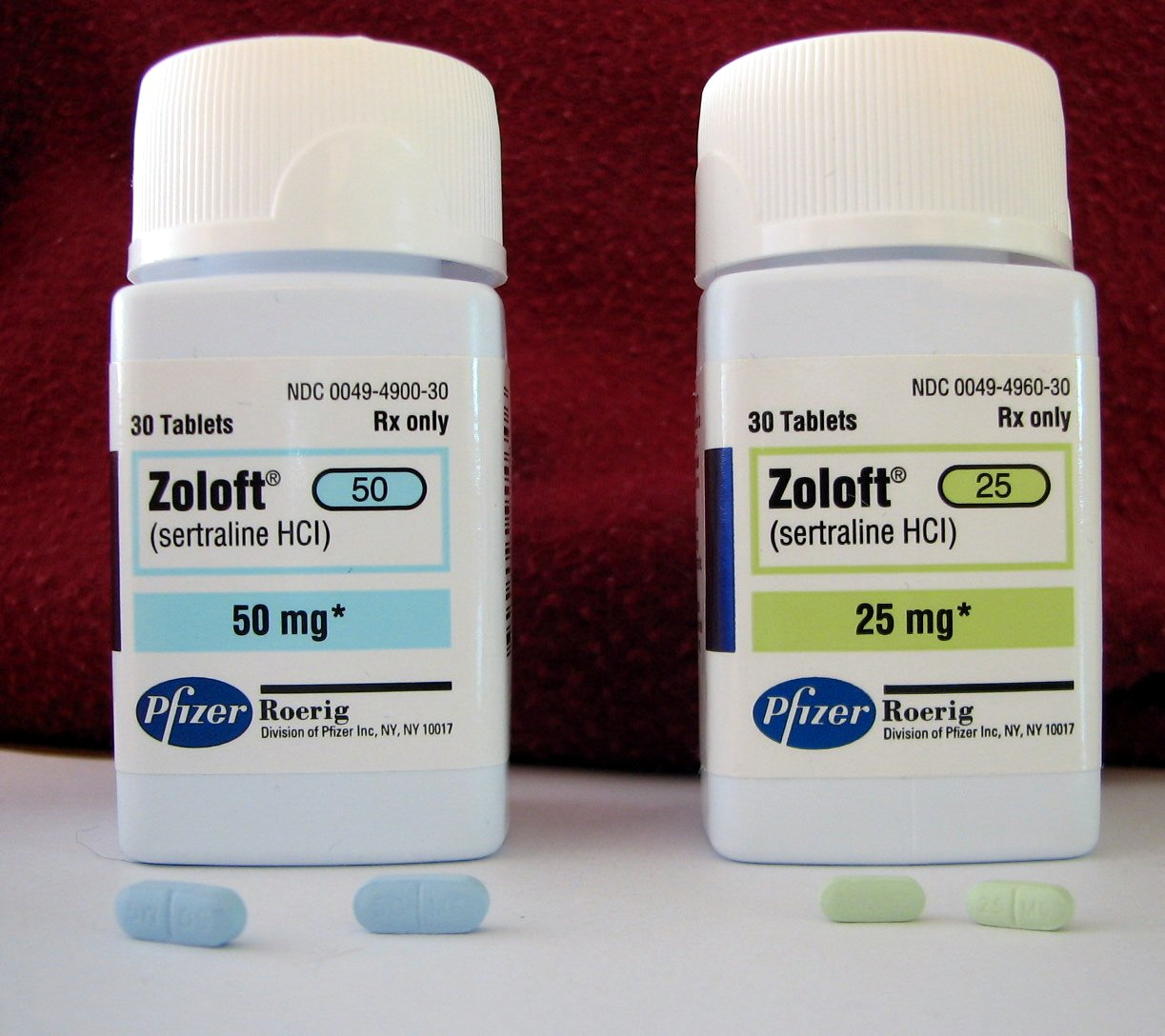
Zoloft (sertraline) is an SSRI antidepressant.

Psychiatric medications are psychoactive drugs prescribed for the management of mental and emotional disorders, or to aid in overcoming challenging behavior. There are six major classes of psychiatric medications:

- Antidepressants treat disorders such as clinical depression, dysthymia, anxiety, eating disorders, and borderline personality disorder.
- Stimulants, used to treat disorders such as attention deficit hyperactivity disorder and narcolepsy, and for weight reduction.
- Antipsychotics, used to treat psychotic symptoms, such as those associated with schizophrenia or severe mania, or as adjuncts to relieve clinical depression.
- Mood stabilizers, used to treat bipolar disorder and schizoaffective disorder.
- Anxiolytics, used to treat anxiety disorders.
- Depressants, used as hypnotics, sedatives, and anesthetics, depending upon dosage.

In addition, several psychoactive substances are currently employed to treat various addictions. These include acamprosate or naltrexone in the treatment of alcoholism, or methadone or buprenorphine maintenance therapy in the case of opioid addiction.

Exposure to psychoactive drugs can cause changes to the brain that counteract or augment some of their effects; these changes may be beneficial or harmful. However, there is a significant amount of evidence that the relapse rate of mental disorders negatively corresponds with the length of properly followed treatment regimens (that is, relapse rate substantially declines over time), and to a much greater degree than placebo.

=== Military ===
==== Drugs used by militaries ====
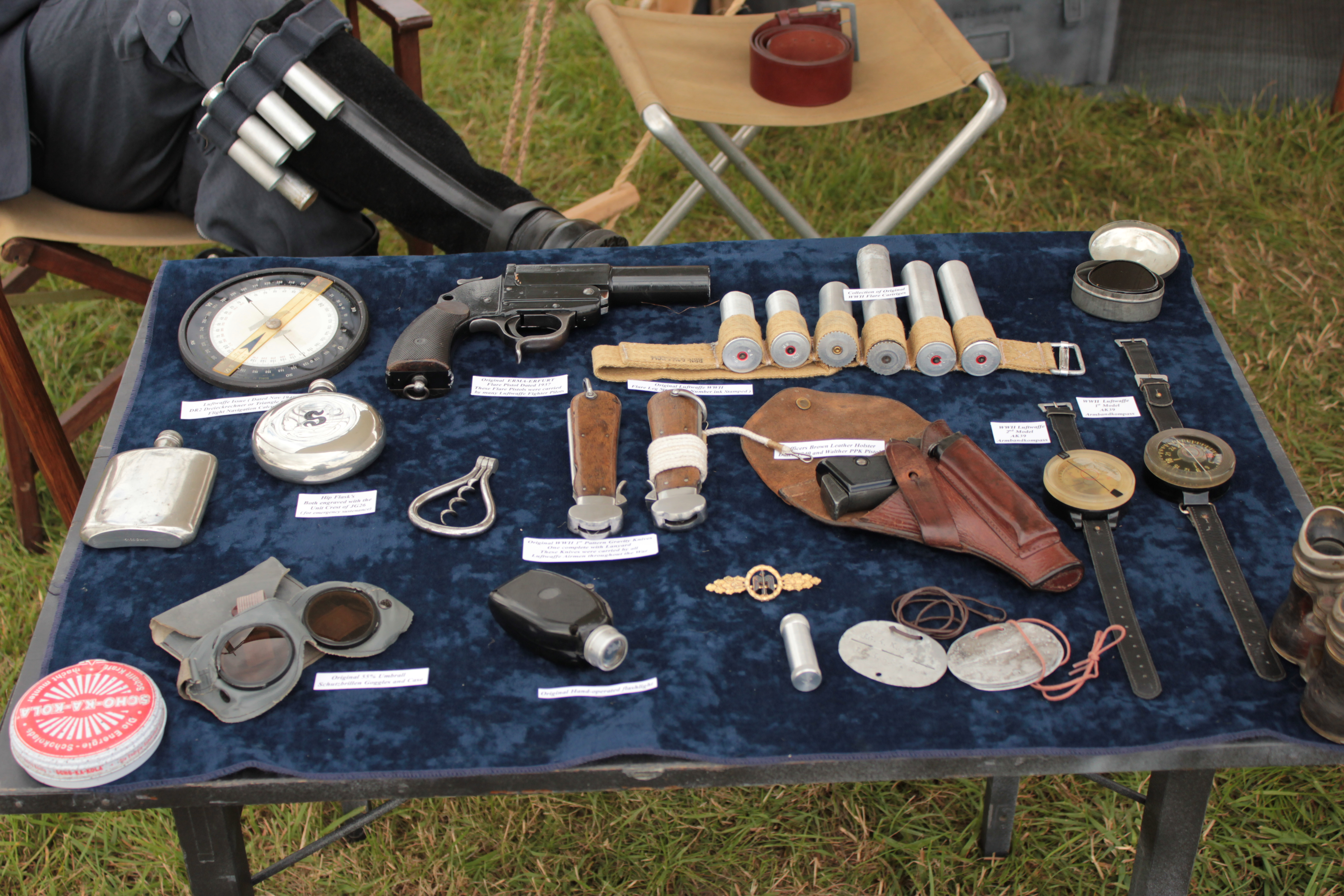
Two hip flasks, located in the left-center, are featured in the military equipment used as emergency sustenance by the Luftwaffe, which was the air force of Nazi Germany during World War II.

Militaries worldwide have used or are using various psychoactive drugs to treat pain and to improve performance of soldiers by suppressing hunger, increasing the ability to sustain effort without food, increasing and lengthening wakefulness and concentration, suppressing fear, reducing empathy, and improving reflexes and memory-recall among other things.

Both military and civilian American intelligence officials are known to have used psychoactive drugs while interrogating captives apprehended in its "war on terror". In July 2012 Jason Leopold and Jeffrey Kaye, psychologists and human rights workers, had a Freedom of Information Act request fulfilled that confirmed that the use of psychoactive drugs during interrogation was a long-standing practice. Captives and former captives had been reporting medical staff collaborating with interrogators to drug captives with powerful psychoactive drugs prior to interrogation since the very first captives release. In May 2003 recently released Pakistani captive Sha Mohammed Alikhel described the routine use of psychoactive drugs. He said that Jihan Wali, a captive kept in a nearby cell, was rendered catatonic through the use of these drugs.

Alcohol has a long association of military use, and has been called "liquid courage" for its role in preparing troops for battle, anaesthetize injured soldiers, and celebrate military victories. It has also served as a coping mechanism for combat stress reactions and a means of decompression from combat to everyday life. However, this reliance on alcohol can have negative consequences for physical and mental health.

The first documented case of a soldier overdosing on methamphetamine during combat, was the Finnish corporal Aimo Koivunen, a soldier who fought in the Winter War and the Continuation War.

==== Psychochemical warfare ====
Psychoactive drugs have been used in military applications as non-lethal weapons.

=== Pain management ===
Psychoactive drugs are often prescribed to manage pain. The subjective experience of pain is primarily regulated by endogenous opioid peptides. Thus, pain can often be managed using psychoactives that operate on this neurotransmitter system, also known as opioid receptor agonists. This class of drugs can be highly addictive, and includes opiate narcotics, like morphine and codeine. NSAIDs, such as aspirin and ibuprofen, are also analgesics. These agents also reduce eicosanoid-mediated inflammation by inhibiting the enzyme cyclooxygenase.

==== Anesthesia ====
General anesthetics are a class of psychoactive drug used on people to block physical pain and other sensations. Most anesthetics induce unconsciousness, allowing the person to undergo medical procedures like surgery, without the feelings of physical pain or emotional trauma. To induce unconsciousness, anesthetics affect the GABA and NMDA systems. For example, Propofol is a GABA agonist, and ketamine is an NMDA receptor antagonist.

=== Performance-enhancement ===
Performance-enhancing substances, also known as performance-enhancing drugs (PEDs), are substances that are used to improve any form of activity performance in humans. A well-known example of cheating in sports involves doping in sport, where banned physical performance-enhancing drugs are used by athletes and bodybuilders. Athletic performance-enhancing substances are sometimes referred as ergogenic aids. Cognitive performance-enhancing drugs, commonly called nootropics, are sometimes used by students to improve academic performance. Performance-enhancing substances are also used by military personnel to enhance combat performance.

=== Recreation ===
Global per capita alcohol consumption has shown a downward trajectory since the 20th century, suggesting a shift towards prioritizing health and well-being.

Many psychoactive substances are used for their mood and perception altering effects, including those with accepted uses in medicine and psychiatry. Examples of psychoactive substances include caffeine, alcohol, cocaine, LSD, nicotine, cannabis, and dextromethorphan. Classes of drugs frequently used recreationally include:

- Stimulants, which activate the central nervous system. These are used recreationally for their euphoric effects. Examples include cocaine, methamphetamine, and cathinone.
- Hallucinogens (psychedelics, dissociatives and deliriants), which induce perceptual and cognitive alterations. Examples include dimethyltryptamine (DMT), psilocybin, and salvinorin A.
- Hypnotics, which depress the central nervous system. Examples include benzodiazepines, nonbenzodiazepines, and barbiturates.
- Opioid analgesics, which also depress the central nervous system. These are used recreationally because of their euphoric effects. Examples include heroin, fentanyl, and morphine.
- Inhalants, in the forms of gas aerosols, or solvents, which are inhaled as a vapor because of their stupefying effects. Many inhalants also fall into the above categories (such as nitrous oxide which is also an analgesic).

In some modern and ancient cultures, drug usage is seen as a status symbol. Recreational drugs are seen as status symbols in settings such as at nightclubs and parties. For example, in ancient Egypt, gods were commonly pictured holding hallucinogenic plants.

Because there is controversy about regulation of recreational drugs, there is an ongoing debate about drug prohibition. Critics of prohibition believe that regulation of recreational drug use is a violation of personal autonomy and freedom. In the United States, critics have noted that prohibition or regulation of recreational and spiritual drug use might be unconstitutional, and causing more harm than is prevented.

Some people who take psychoactive drugs experience drug- or substance-induced psychosis. A 2019 systematic review and meta-analysis by Murrie et al. found that the pooled proportion of transition from substance-induced psychosis to schizophrenia was 25% (95% CI 18%–35%), compared with 36% (95% CI 30%–43%) for brief, atypical and not otherwise specified psychoses. Type of substance was the primary predictor of transition from drug-induced psychosis to schizophrenia, with highest rates associated with cannabis (6 studies, 34%, CI 25%–46%), hallucinogens (3 studies, 26%, CI 14%–43%) and amphetamines (5 studies, 22%, CI 14%–34%). Lower rates were reported for opioid (12%), alcohol (10%) and sedative (9%) induced psychoses. Transition rates were slightly lower in older cohorts but were not affected by sex, country of the study, hospital or community location, urban or rural setting, diagnostic methods, or duration of follow-up.

=== Ritual and spiritual ===
==== Offerings ====
Alcohol and tobacco (nicotine) have been and are used as offerings in various religions and spiritual practices. Coca leaves have been used as offerings in rituals.

===== Alcohol =====
According to the Catholic Church, the sacramental wine used in the Eucharist must contain alcohol. Canon 924 of the present Code of Canon Law (1983) states:

§3 The wine must be natural, made from grapes of the vine, and not corrupt.

==== Psychoactive use ====
===== Entheogen =====
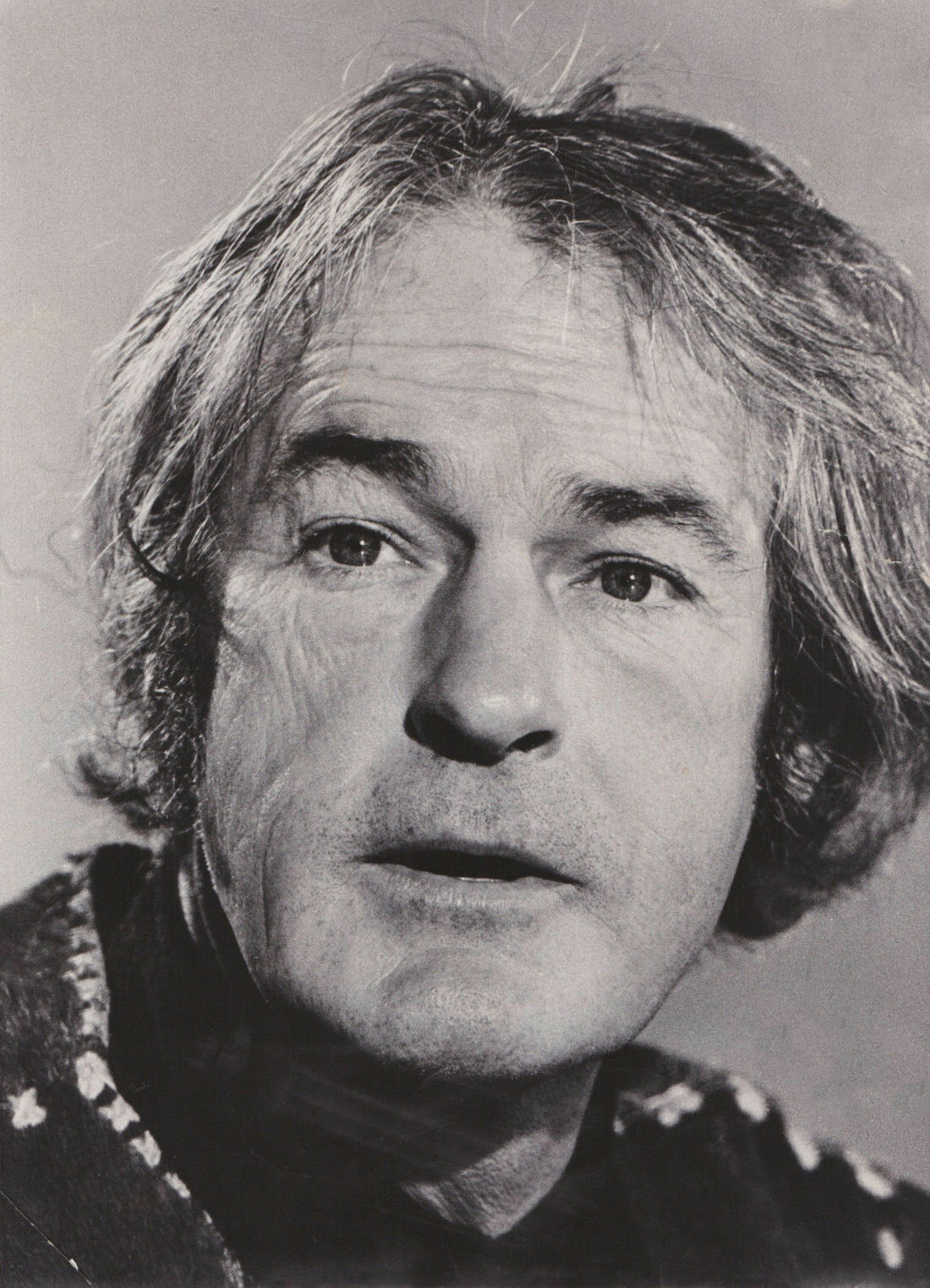
Timothy Leary was a leading proponent of spiritual hallucinogen use.

Certain psychoactives, particularly hallucinogens, have been used for religious purposes since prehistoric times. Native Americans have used peyote cacti containing mescaline for religious ceremonies for as long as 5700 years. The muscimol-containing Amanita muscaria mushroom was used for ritual purposes throughout prehistoric Europe.

The use of entheogens for religious purposes resurfaced in the West during the counterculture movements of the 1960s and 70s. Under the leadership of psychologist Timothy Leary, new spiritual and intention-based movements began to use LSD and other hallucinogens as tools to access deeper inner exploration. In the United States, the use of peyote for ritual purposes is protected only for members of the Native American Church, which is allowed to cultivate and distribute peyote. However, the genuine religious use of peyote, regardless of one's personal ancestry, is protected in Colorado, Arizona, New Mexico, Nevada, and Oregon.

===== Psychedelic therapy =====
Psychedelic therapy (or psychedelic-assisted therapy) refers to the proposed use of psychedelic drugs, such as psilocybin, MDMA, (Note: MDMA and Ketamine are not a classical psychedelics but are sometimes discussed alongside classical psychedelics due to similarities in their psychoactive and potentially therapeutic effects.) LSD, and ayahuasca, to treat mental disorders. As of 2021, psychedelic drugs are controlled substances in most countries and psychedelic therapy is not legally available outside clinical trials, with some exceptions.

===== Psychonautics =====
The aims and methods of psychonautics, when state-altering substances are involved, is commonly distinguished from recreational drug use by research sources. Psychonautics as a means of exploration need not involve drugs, and may take place in a religious context with an established history. Cohen considers psychonautics closer in association to wisdom traditions and other transpersonal and integral movements.

=== Self-medication ===
Self-medication, sometime called do-it-yourself (DIY) medicine, is a human behavior in which an individual uses a substance or any exogenous influence to self-administer treatment for physical or psychological conditions, for example headaches or fatigue.

The substances most widely used in self-medication are over-the-counter drugs and dietary supplements, which are used to treat common health issues at home. These do not require a doctor's prescription to obtain and, in some countries, are available in supermarkets and convenience stores.

=== Sex ===
Sex and drugs date back to ancient humans and have been interlocked throughout human history. Both legal and illegal, the consumption of drugs and their effects on the human body encompasses all aspects of sex, including desire, performance, pleasure, conception, gestation, and disease.

There are many different types of drugs that are commonly associated with their effects on sex, including alcohol, cannabis, cocaine, MDMA, GHB, amphetamines, opioids, antidepressants, and many others.

=== Social movements ===
==== Cannabis ====
In the US, NORML (National Organization for the Reform of Marijuana Laws) has led since the 1970s a movement to legalize cannabis nationally. The so-called "420 movement" is the global association of the number 420 with cannabis consumption: April 20th – fourth month, twentieth day – has become an international counterculture holiday based on the celebration and consumption of cannabis; 4:20 pm on any day is a time to consume cannabis.

===== Operation Overgrow =====
Operation Overgrow is the name, given by cannabis activists, of an "operation" to spread marijuana seeds wildly "so it grows like weed". The thought behind the operation is to draw attention to the debate about legalization/decriminalization of marijuana.

=== Suicide ===
A drug overdose involves taking a dose of a drug that exceeds safe levels. In the UK (England and Wales) until 2013, a drug overdose was the most common suicide method in females. In 2019 in males the percentage is 16%. Self-poisoning accounts for the highest number of non-fatal suicide attempts. In the United States about 60% of suicide attempts and 14% of suicide deaths involve drug overdoses. The case fatality rate of suicide attempts involving overdose is about 2%.

Most people are under the influence of sedative-hypnotic drugs (such as alcohol or benzodiazepines) when they die by suicide, with alcoholism present in between 15% and 61% of cases. Countries that have higher rates of alcohol use and a greater density of bars generally also have higher rates of suicide. About 2.2–3.4% of those who have been treated for alcoholism at some point in their life die by suicide. Alcoholics who attempt suicide are usually male, older, and have tried to take their own lives in the past. In adolescents who misuse alcohol, neurological and psychological dysfunctions may contribute to the increased risk of suicide.

Overdose attempts using painkillers are among the most common, due to their easy availability over-the-counter.

== Route of administration ==
Psychoactive drugs are administered via oral ingestion as a tablet, capsule, powder, liquid, and beverage; via injection by subcutaneous, intramuscular, and intravenous route; via rectum by suppository and enema; and via inhalation by smoking, vaporizing, and snorting. The efficiency of each method of administration varies from drug to drug.

The psychiatric drugs fluoxetine, quetiapine, and lorazepam are ingested orally in tablet or capsule form. Alcohol and caffeine are ingested in beverage form; nicotine and cannabis are smoked or vaporized; peyote and psilocybin mushrooms are ingested in botanical form or dried; and crystalline drugs such as cocaine and methamphetamine are usually inhaled or snorted.

== Determinants of effects ==
The theory of dosage, set, and setting is a useful model in dealing with the effects of psychoactive substances, especially in a controlled therapeutic setting as well as in recreational use. Timothy Leary, based on his own experiences and systematic observations on psychedelics, developed this theory along with his colleagues Ralph Metzner, and Richard Alpert (Ram Dass) in the 1960s.

Dosage

The first factor, dosage, has been a truism since ancient times, or at least since Paracelsus who said, "Dose makes the poison." Some compounds are beneficial or pleasurable when consumed in small amounts, but harmful, deadly, or evoke discomfort in higher doses.

Set

The set is the internal attitudes and constitution of the person, including their expectations, wishes, fears, and sensitivity to the drug. This factor is especially important for the hallucinogens, which have the ability to make conscious experiences out of the unconscious. In traditional cultures, set is shaped primarily by the worldview, health and genetic characteristics that all the members of the culture share.

Setting

The third aspect is setting, which pertains to the surroundings, the place, and the time in which the experiences transpire.

This theory clearly states that the effects are equally the result of chemical, pharmacological, psychological, and physical influences. The model that Leary proposed applied to the psychedelics, although it also applies to other psychoactives.

== Effects ==
Illustration of the major elements of neurotransmission. Depending on its method of action, a psychoactive substance may block the receptors on the post-synaptic neuron (dendrite), or block reuptake or affect neurotransmitter synthesis in the pre-synaptic neuron (axon).

Psychoactive drugs operate by temporarily affecting a person's neurochemistry, which in turn causes changes in a person's mood, cognition, perception and behavior. There are many ways in which psychoactive drugs can affect the brain. Each drug has a specific action on one or more neurotransmitter or neuroreceptor in the brain.

Drugs that increase activity in particular neurotransmitter systems are called agonists. They act by increasing the synthesis of one or more neurotransmitters, by reducing its reuptake from the synapses, or by mimicking the action by binding directly to the postsynaptic receptor. Drugs that reduce neurotransmitter activity are called antagonists, and operate by interfering with synthesis or blocking postsynaptic receptors so that neurotransmitters cannot bind to them.

Exposure to a psychoactive substance can cause changes in the structure and functioning of neurons, as the nervous system tries to re-establish the homeostasis disrupted by the presence of the drug (see also, neuroplasticity). Exposure to antagonists for a particular neurotransmitter can increase the number of receptors for that neurotransmitter or the receptors themselves may become more responsive to neurotransmitters; this is called sensitization. Conversely, overstimulation of receptors for a particular neurotransmitter may cause a decrease in both number and sensitivity of these receptors, a process called desensitization or tolerance. Sensitization and desensitization are more likely to occur with long-term exposure, although they may occur after only a single exposure. These processes are thought to play a role in drug dependence and addiction. Physical dependence on antidepressants or anxiolytics may result in worse depression or anxiety, respectively, as withdrawal symptoms. Unfortunately, because clinical depression (also called major depressive disorder) is often referred to simply as depression, antidepressants are often requested by and prescribed for patients who are depressed, but not clinically depressed.

=== Affected neurotransmitter systems ===
The following is a brief table of notable drugs and their primary neurotransmitter, receptor or method of action. Many drugs act on more than one transmitter or receptor in the brain.

Neurotransmitter/receptor	Classification	Examples
Acetylcholine	Cholinergics (acetylcholine receptor agonists)	arecoline, nicotine, piracetam
Acetylcholine	Muscarinic antagonists (acetylcholine receptor antagonists)	scopolamine, benzatropine, dimenhydrinate, diphenhydramine, trihexiphenidyl, doxylamine, atropine, quetiapine, olanzapine, most tricyclics
Acetylcholine	Nicotinic antagonists (acetylcholine receptor antagonists)	memantine, bupropion
Adenosine	Adenosine receptor antagonists	caffeine, theobromine, theophylline
Dopamine	Dopamine reuptake inhibitors	cocaine, bupropion, methylphenidate, modafinil, St John's wort
Dopamine	Dopamine releasing agents	amphetamine, methamphetamine, MDMA, cathinone, phentermine, phenmetrazine, aminorex
Dopamine	Dopamine agonists	pramipexole, Ropinirole, L-DOPA (prodrug), memantine
Dopamine	Dopamine antagonists	haloperidol, droperidol, many antipsychotics (e.g., risperidone, olanzapine, quetiapine)
Dopamine	Dopamine partial agonists	LSD, aripiprazole
gamma-Aminobutyric acid (GABA)	GABA reuptake inhibitors	tiagabine, St John's wort, vigabatrin, deramciclane
gamma-Aminobutyric acid (GABA)	GABAA receptor agonists	ethanol, niacin, barbiturates, diazepam, clonazepam, lorazepam, temazepam, alprazolam and other benzodiazepines, zolpidem, eszopiclone, zaleplon and other nonbenzodiazepines, muscimol, phenibut
gamma-Aminobutyric acid (GABA)	GABAA receptor positive allosteric modulators	
gamma-Aminobutyric acid (GABA)	GABA receptor antagonists	thujone, bicuculline
gamma-Aminobutyric acid (GABA)	GABAA receptor negative allosteric modulators	
Norepinephrine	Norepinephrine reuptake inhibitors	St John's wort, most non-SSRI antidepressants such as amoxapine, atomoxetine, bupropion, reboxetine, the tricyclics, methylphenidate, SNRIs such as duloxetine, venlafaxine, cocaine, tramadol
Norepinephrine	Norepinephrine releasing agents	ephedrine, PPA, pseudoephedrine, amphetamine, phenethylamine, methamphetamine
Norepinephrine	Adrenergic agonists	clonidine, guanfacine, phenylephrine
Norepinephrine	Adrenergic antagonists	carvedilol, metoprolol, mianserin, prazosin, propranolol, trazodone, yohimbine, olanzapine
Serotonin	Serotonin receptor agonists	triptans (e.g. sumatriptan, eletriptan), psychedelics (e.g. lysergic acid diethylamide, psilocybin, mescaline), ergolines (e.g. lisuride, bromocriptine)
Serotonin	Serotonin reuptake inhibitors	most antidepressants including St John's wort, tricyclics such as imipramine, SSRIs (e.g. fluoxetine, sertraline, escitalopram), SNRIs (e.g. duloxetine, venlafaxine)
Serotonin	Serotonin releasing agents	fenfluramine, MDMA (ecstasy), tryptamine
Serotonin	Serotonin receptor antagonists	ritanserin, mirtazapine, mianserin, trazodone, cyproheptadine, memantine, atypical antipsychotics (e.g., risperidone, olanzapine, quetiapine)
AMPA receptor	AMPA receptor positive allosteric modulators	aniracetam, CX717, piracetam
AMPA receptor	AMPA receptor antagonists	kynurenic acid, NBQX, topiramate
Anandamide (Endocannabinoid system)	Cannabinoid receptor agonists	JWH-018
Anandamide (Endocannabinoid system)	Cannabinoid receptor partial agonists	Anandamide, THC, cannabidiol, cannabinol
Anandamide (Endocannabinoid system)	Cannabinoid receptor inverse agonists	Rimonabant
Anandamide (Endocannabinoid system)	Anandamide reuptake inhibitors	LY 2183240, VDM 11, AM 404
Anandamide (Endocannabinoid system)	FAAH enzyme inhibitors	MAFP, URB597, N-Arachidonylglycine
NMDA receptor	NMDA receptor antagonists	ethanol, ketamine, deschloroketamine, 2-Fluorodeschloroketamine, PCP, DXM, Nitrous Oxide, memantine
GHB receptor	GHB receptor agonists	GHB, T-HCA
Sigma receptor	Sigma-1 receptor agonists	cocaine, DMT, DXM, fluvoxamine, ibogaine, opipramol, PCP, methamphetamine
Sigma receptor	Sigma-2 receptor agonists	methamphetamine
Opioid receptor	μ-opioid receptor agonists	Narcotic opioids (e.g. codeine, morphine, hydrocodone, hydromorphone, oxycodone, oxymorphone, heroin, fentanyl)
Opioid receptor	μ-opioid receptor partial agonists	buprenorphine
Opioid receptor	μ-opioid receptor inverse agonists	naloxone
Opioid receptor	μ-opioid receptor antagonists	naltrexone
Opioid receptor	κ-opioid receptor agonists	salvinorin A, butorphanol, nalbuphine, pentazocine, ibogaine
Opioid receptor	κ-opioid receptor antagonists	buprenorphine
Histamine receptor	H_{1} receptor antagonists	diphenhydramine, doxylamine, mirtazapine, mianserin, quetiapine, olanzapine, meclozine, most tricyclics
Histamine receptor	H_{3} receptor antagonists	pitolisant
Histamine receptor	Indirect histamine receptor agonists	modafinil
Monoamine oxidase	Monoamine oxidase inhibitors (MAOIs)	phenelzine, iproniazid, tranylcypromine, selegiline, rasagiline, moclobemide, isocarboxazid, Linezolid, benmoxin, St John's wort, coffee, garlic
Melatonin receptor	Melatonin receptor agonists	agomelatine, melatonin, ramelteon, tasimelteon
Imidazoline receptor	Imidazoline receptor agonists	apraclonidine, clonidine, moxonidine, rilmenidine
Orexin receptor	Inderict Orexin receptor agonists	modafinil
Orexin receptor	Orexin receptor antagonists	SB-334,867, SB-408,124, TCS-OX2-29, suvorexant

== Addiction and dependence ==
Addiction and dependence glossary
- addiction – a neuropsychological disorder characterized by a persistent and intense urge to use a drug or engage in a behavior that produces natural reward; addictive drug – psychoactive substances that with repeated use are associated with significantly higher rates of substance use disorders, due in large part to the drug's effect on brain reward systems; dependence – an adaptive state associated with a withdrawal syndrome upon cessation of repeated exposure to a stimulus (e.g., drug intake); drug sensitization or reverse tolerance – the escalating effect of a drug resulting from repeated administration at a given dose; drug withdrawal – symptoms that occur upon cessation of repeated drug use; physical dependence – dependence that involves persistent physical–somatic withdrawal symptoms (e.g., delirium tremens and nausea); psychological dependence – dependence that is characterized by emotional-motivational withdrawal symptoms (e.g., anhedonia and anxiety) that affect cognitive functioning.; reinforcing stimuli – stimuli that increase the probability of repeating behaviors paired with them; rewarding stimuli – stimuli that the brain interprets as intrinsically positive and desirable or as something to approach; sensitization – an amplified response to a stimulus resulting from repeated exposure to it; substance use disorder – a condition in which the use of substances leads to clinically and functionally significant impairment or distress; drug tolerance – the diminishing effect of a drug resulting from repeated administration at a given dose

Comparison of the perceived harm for various psychoactive drugs from a poll among medical psychiatrists specialized in addiction treatment (David Nutt et al. 2007)

Psychoactive drugs are often associated with addiction or drug dependence. Dependence can be divided into two types: psychological dependence, by which a user experiences negative psychological or emotional withdrawal symptoms (e.g., depression) and physical dependence, by which a user must use a drug to avoid physically uncomfortable or even medically harmful physical withdrawal symptoms. Drugs that are both rewarding and reinforcing are addictive; these properties of a drug are mediated through activation of the mesolimbic dopamine pathway, particularly the nucleus accumbens. Not all addictive drugs are associated with physical dependence, e.g., amphetamine, and not all drugs that produce physical dependence are addictive drugs, e.g., oxymetazoline.

Globally, as of 2016, alcohol use disorders were the most prevalent of all substance use disorders (SUD) worldwide; cannabis dependence and opioid dependence were the next most prevalent SUDs.

Many professionals, self-help groups, and businesses specialize in drug rehabilitation, with varying degrees of success, and many parents attempt to influence the actions and choices of their children regarding psychoactives.

Common forms of rehabilitation include psychotherapy, support groups and pharmacotherapy, which uses psychoactive substances to reduce cravings and physiological withdrawal symptoms while a user is going through detox. Methadone, itself an opioid and a psychoactive substance, is a common treatment for heroin addiction, as is another opioid, buprenorphine. Recent research on addiction has shown some promise in using psychedelics such as ibogaine to treat and even cure drug addictions, although this has yet to become a widely accepted practice.

== Legality ==
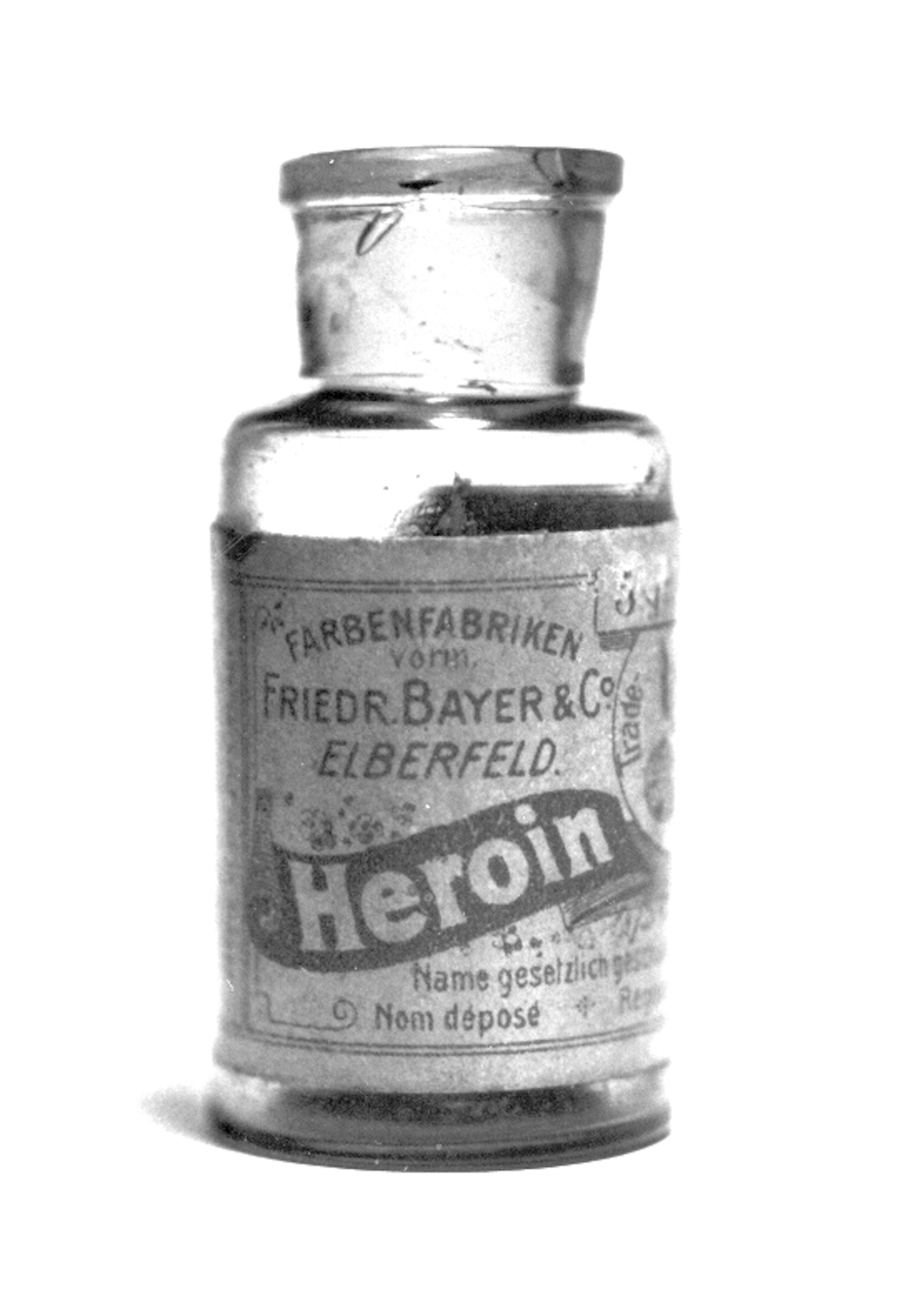
Historical image of legal heroin bottle

The legality of psychoactive drugs has been controversial through most of recent history; the Second Opium War and Prohibition are two historical examples of legal controversy surrounding psychoactive drugs. However, in recent years, the most influential document regarding the legality of psychoactive drugs is the Single Convention on Narcotic Drugs, an international treaty signed in 1961 as an Act of the United Nations. Signed by 73 nations including the United States, the USSR, Pakistan, India, and the United Kingdom, the Single Convention on Narcotic Drugs established Schedules for the legality of each drug and laid out an international agreement to fight addiction to recreational drugs by combatting the sale, trafficking, and use of scheduled drugs. All countries that signed the treaty passed laws to implement these rules within their borders. However, some countries that signed the Single Convention on Narcotic Drugs, such as the Netherlands, are more lenient with their enforcement of these laws.

In the United States, the Food and Drug Administration (FDA) has authority over all drugs, including psychoactive drugs. The FDA regulates which psychoactive drugs are over the counter and which are only available with a prescription. However, certain psychoactive drugs, like alcohol, tobacco, and drugs listed in the Single Convention on Narcotic Drugs are subject to criminal laws. The Controlled Substances Act of 1970 regulates the recreational drugs outlined in the Single Convention on Narcotic Drugs. Alcohol is regulated by state governments, but the federal National Minimum Drinking Age Act penalizes states for not following a national drinking age. Tobacco is also regulated by all fifty state governments. Most people accept such restrictions and prohibitions of certain drugs, especially the "hard" drugs, which are illegal in most countries.

In the medical context, psychoactive drugs as a treatment for illness is widespread and generally accepted. Little controversy exists concerning over the counter psychoactive medications in antiemetics and antitussives. Psychoactive drugs are commonly prescribed to patients with psychiatric disorders. However, certain critics believe that certain prescription psychoactives, such as antidepressants and stimulants, are overprescribed and threaten patients' judgement and autonomy.

== Effect on animals ==
A number of animals consume different psychoactive plants, animals, berries and even fermented fruit, becoming intoxicated. An example of this is cats after consuming catnip. Traditional legends of sacred plants often contain references to animals that introduced humankind to their use. Animals and psychoactive plants appear to have co-evolved, possibly explaining why these chemicals and their receptors exist within the nervous system.

== Widely used psychoactive drugs ==
This is a list of commonly used drugs that contain psychoactive ingredients. Please note that the following lists contains legal and illegal drugs (based on the country's laws).

=== Common legal drugs ===
The most widely consumed psychotropic drugs worldwide are:

- Caffeine
- Alcohol
- Nicotine

=== Common prescribed drugs ===
- Benzodiazepines
- Cannabis
- Opioids
- Amphetamines
- SSRIs

=== Common street drugs ===
- Cocaine
- Heroin
- LSD
- Methamphetamine
- Ecstasy
- Psilocybin mushrooms
- Benzodiazepines
- Pharmaceutical drugs
- Stimulants

== See also ==
- Contact high
- Counterculture of the 1960s
- Demand reduction
- Designer drug
- Drug
- Drug addiction
- Drug checking
- Drug policy
- Drug rehabilitation
- Hamilton's Pharmacopeia
- Hard and soft drugs
- Harm reduction
- List of psychoactive drugs
- Neuropsychopharmacology
- Psychopharmacology
- Poly drug use
- Project MKULTRA
- Psychedelic plants
- Psychoactive fish
- PsychonautWiki
- Recreational drug use
- Responsible drug use
- Self-medication
- The Encyclopedia of Psychoactive Plants
