= List of psychoactive drugs =

This is a list of psychoactive drugs, or drugs that produce psychoactive effects. Psychoactive drugs can be broadly grouped into stimulants, depressants, and hallucinogens and entactogens, although not all psychoactive drugs fall neatly into these categories. Many psychoactive drugs are recreational drugs or drugs of misuse, with these drugs generally falling into the categories of euphoriants and hallucinogens.

== Stimulants ==
- Adenosine receptor antagonists (e.g., caffeine, theophylline, theobromine, paraxanthine, istradefylline)
- Catecholamine releasing agents (e.g., amphetamine, methamphetamine, lisdexamfetamine, MDMA, mephedrone, cathinone, ephedrine)
- Catecholamine reuptake inhibitors (e.g., methylphenidate, MDPV, cocaine, modafinil, bupropion, atomoxetine)
- GABA_{A} receptor antagonists (e.g., pentylenetetrazol)
- Glycine receptor antagonists (e.g., strychnine)
- Histamine H_{3} receptor antagonists (e.g., pitolisant)
- Muscarinic acetylcholine receptor agonists (e.g., arecoline)
- Nicotinic acetylcholine receptor agonists (e.g., nicotine)
- Orexin receptor agonists (e.g., danavorexton, oveporexton)

== Depressants ==
- GABA_{A} receptor agonists (e.g., muscimol, gaboxadol)
- GABA_{A} receptor positive allosteric modulators
  - Alcohols (e.g., ethanol, tert-amyl alcohol)
  - Barbiturates (e.g., phenobarbital, pentobarbital, secobarbital, thiopental)
  - Benzodiazepines (e.g., diazepam, clonazepam, alprazolam, lorazepam, triazolam, temazepam)
  - Carbamates (e.g., meprobamate, carisoprodol)
  - Inhalants/volatiles (e.g., chloral hydrate, chloroform, diethyl ether, halothane, sevoflurane)
  - Neurosteroids (e.g., progesterone, allopregnanolone/brexanolone, zuranolone)
  - Nonbenzodiazepines/Z drugs (e.g., zolpidem, zopiclone, eszopiclone, zaleplon)
  - Quinazolinones (e.g., methaqualone)
  - Others (e.g., etomidate, glutethimide, kava/kavalactones, potassium bromide, propofol)
- GABA_{B} receptor agonists (e.g., GHB/sodium oxybate, GBL, 1,4-butanediol (1,4-BD), phenibut)
- Gabapentinoids (α_{2}δ ligands) (e.g., gabapentin, pregabalin, gabapentin enacarbil, phenibut)
- Histamine H_{1} receptor antagonists (e.g., diphenhydramine, doxylamine, hydroxyzine, doxepin, mirtazapine)
- Melatonin receptor agonists (e.g., melatonin, ramelteon, tasimelteon)
- Opioids (μ-opioid receptor agonists) (e.g., codeine, morphine, heroin, hydrocodone, oxycodone, fentanyl, methadone, buprenorphine, kratom)
- Orexin receptor antagonists (e.g., suvorexant, lemborexant, daridorexant, seltorexant)

== Hallucinogens ==
- Psychedelics (serotonin 5-HT_{2A} receptor agonists) (e.g., LSD, psilocybin, mescaline, dimethyltryptamine (DMT), 5-MeO-DMT, 2C-B, ergine)
- Dissociatives (NMDA receptor antagonists) (e.g., ketamine, phencyclidine (PCP), dextromethorphan (DXM), nitrous oxide (N_{2}O))
- Deliriants (muscarinic acetylcholine receptor antagonists) (e.g., scopolamine, atropine, hyoscyamine, diphenhydramine, trihexyphenidyl)
- Oneirogens (e.g., ibogaine, harmaline, tetrahydroharmine (THH))
- GABA_{A} receptor agonists (e.g., muscimol, gaboxadol)
- κ-Opioid receptor agonists (e.g., salvinorin A, pentazocine)
- Cannabinoids (cannabinoid CB_{1} receptor agonists) (e.g., tetrahydrocannabinol (THC), nabilone, JWH-018, JWH-073, HU-210)
- Others (e.g., carbogen, hallucinogenic bolete mushrooms/Lanmaoa asiatica, hallucinogenic fish/ichthyoallyeinotoxism, mad honey, nutmeg)

== Others ==
- Cannabinoids (cannabinoid CB_{1} receptor agonists) (e.g., tetrahydrocannabinol (THC), nabilone, JWH-018, JWH-073, HU-210)
- Entactogens (serotonin releasing agents) (e.g., MDMA, MDA, methylone, mephedrone, 5-MAPB, 6-APB, MDAI, Borax combo)
- Glucocorticoids (glucocorticoid receptor agonists) (e.g., cortisol/hydrocortisone, prednisone, prednisolone, dexamethasone)
- Nootropics (e.g., piracetam)
- Poppers/alkyl nitrites (e.g., amyl nitrite)
- Others (e.g., blue lotus/blue water lily, brivaracetam, flupirtine, kanna, lacosamide, lasmiditan, perampanel, retigabine (ezogabine), etc.)

== Psychiatric drugs ==
- Antidepressants (e.g., SSRIs, SNRIs, TCAs, TeCAs, SARIs, MAOIs, bupropion)
- Antipsychotics (e.g., typical antipsychotics like chlorpromazine and haloperidol and atypical antipsychotics like quetiapine and aripiprazole)
- Anxiolytics (e.g., azapirones like buspirone and tandospirone, beta blockers like propranolol, etc.)
- Mood stabilizers (e.g., lithium, valproic acid, carbamazepine, lamotrigine)

== See also ==
- Recreational drug use
- List of drugs
- List of designer drugs
- List of euphoriants
- List of psychoactive plants
- List of psychiatric drugs by type
- List of substances used in rituals
- Psychonautics
