= Orexin receptor =

G-protein-coupled receptor

hypocretin (orexin) receptor 1

Identifiers
- Symbol: HCRTR1
- NCBI gene: 3061
- HGNC: 4848
- OMIM: 602392
- RefSeq: NM_001525
- UniProt: O43613

Other data
- Locus: Chr. 1 p33
Search for
- Structures: Swiss-model
- Domains: InterPro

hypocretin (orexin) receptor 2

Identifiers
- Symbol: HCRTR2
- NCBI gene: 3062
- HGNC: 4849
- OMIM: 602393
- RefSeq: NM_001526
- UniProt: O43614

Other data
- Locus: Chr. 6 p11-q11
Search for
- Structures: Swiss-model
- Domains: InterPro

Orexin receptor type 2

Identifiers
- Symbol: Orexin_rec2
- Pfam: PF03827
- InterPro: IPR004060
Available protein structures:
- PDB: IPR004060 PF03827 (ECOD; PDBsum)
- AlphaFold: IPR004060; PF03827

The orexin receptor (also referred to as the hypocretin receptor) is a G-protein-coupled receptor that binds the neuropeptide orexin. There are two variants, OX_{1} and OX_{2}, each encoded by a different gene (HCRTR1, HCRTR2).

Both orexin receptors exhibit a similar pharmacology – the 2 orexin peptides, orexin-A and orexin-B, bind to both receptors and, in each case, agonist binding results in an increase in intracellular calcium levels. However, orexin-B shows a 5- to 10-fold selectivity for orexin receptor type 2, whilst orexin-A is equipotent at both receptors.

Several orexin receptor antagonists are in development for potential use in sleep disorders. The first of these, suvorexant, has been on the market in the United States since 2015. There were two orexin agonists under development as of 2025: oveporexton and TAK-360.

== Ligands ==
Several drugs acting on the orexin system are under development, either orexin agonists for the treatment of conditions such as narcolepsy, or orexin antagonists for insomnia. In August 2015, Nagahara et al. published their work in synthesizing the first HCRT/OX2R agonist, compound 26, with good potency and selectivity.

No neuropeptide agonists are yet available, although synthetic orexin-A polypeptide has been made available as a nasal spray and tested on monkeys. One non-peptide antagonist is currently available in the U.S., Merck's suvorexant (Belsomra), two additional agents are in development: SB-649,868 by GlaxoSmithKline, for sleep disorders, and ACT-462206, currently in human clinical trials. Another drug in development, almorexant (ACT-078573) by Actelion, was abandoned due to adverse effects. Lemborexant, an orexin receptor antagonist, was approved for use in the United States in 2019.

Most ligands acting on the orexin system so far are polypeptides modified from the endogenous agonists orexin-A and orexin-B, however there are some subtype-selective non-peptide antagonists available for research purposes.

=== Agonists ===
==== Non-selective ====
- Orexins – dual OX_{1} and OX_{2} receptor agonists
  - Orexin-A – approximately equipotent at the OX_{1} and OX_{2} receptors
  - Orexin-B – approximately 5- to 10-fold selectivity for the OX_{2} receptor over the OX_{1} receptor
- AEX-5 – selective OX_{1} receptor agonist; also a cathepsin H inhibitor and dopamine reuptake inhibitor
- AEX-19 – dual OX_{1} and OX_{2} receptor agonist
- AEX-24 – selective OX2 receptor agonist; also an "S1R" agonist

==== Selective ====
- Alixorexton (ALKS-2680) – selective oral OX_{2} receptor agonist
- ALKS-7290 – selective OX_{2} receptor agonist
- ALKS-4510 – selective OX_{2} receptor agonist
- Balumorexton (TAK-360) – selective OX_{2} receptor agonist
- Cleminorexton (ORX750) – selective OX_{2} receptor agonist
- Danavorexton (TAK-925) – selective OX_{2} receptor agonist
- Firazorexton (TAK-994) – selective OX_{2} receptor agonist
- Ledasorexton (E-2086) – selective OX_{2} receptor agonist
- Oveporexton (Orzeyful; TAK-861) – selective OX_{2} receptor agonist
- SB-668875 – selective OX_{2} receptor agonist
- Suntinorexton – selective OX_{2} receptor agonist
- PhotOrexin – photoswitchable orexin-B analogue to control the OX_{2} receptor at nanomolar concentration in vivo.

=== Antagonists ===
==== Non-selective ====
- Almorexant (ACT-078573) – dual OX_{1} and OX_{2} receptor antagonist
- Daridorexant (Quviviq; ACT-541468) – dual OX_{1} and OX_{2} receptor antagonist
- Filorexant (MK-6096) – dual OX_{1} and OX_{2} receptor antagonist
- GSK-649868 (SB-649868) – dual OX_{1} and OX_{2} receptor antagonist
- Lemborexant (Dayvigo) – dual OX_{1} and OX_{2} receptor antagonist
- Suvorexant (Belsomra) – dual OX_{1} and OX_{2} receptor antagonist
- Vornorexant (ORN-0829, TS-142) – dual OX_{1} and OX_{2} receptor antagonist

==== Selective ====
- ACT-335827 – selective OX_{1} receptor antagonist
- AZD-4041 – selective OX_{1} receptor antagonist
- CVN-766 – selective OX_{1} receptor antagonist
- EMPA – selective OX_{2} receptor antagonist
- JNJ-10397049 – selective OX_{2} receptor antagonist
- Nivasorexant (ACT-539313) – selective OX_{1} receptor antagonist
- Rocavorexant (C4X-3256; INDV-2000) – selective OX_{1} receptor antagonist
- RTIOX-276 – selective OX_{1} receptor antagonist
- SB-334867 – selective OX_{1} receptor antagonist
- SB-408124 – selective OX_{1} receptor antagonist
- Seltorexant (MIN-202, JNJ-42847922, JNJ-922) – selective OX_{2} receptor antagonist
- TCS-OX2-29 – selective OX_{2} receptor antagonist
- Tebideutorexant (JNJ-61393215; JNJ-3215) – selective OX_{1} receptor antagonist

== See also ==
- List of investigational insomnia drugs
- List of investigational narcolepsy and hypersomnia drugs
