= Alixorexton =

Novel chemistry compound

Clinical data
- Other names: ALKS-2680; ALKS2680
- Routes of administration: Oral
- Drug class: Orexin OX_{2} receptor agonist; Wakefulness-promoting agent

Identifiers
- IUPAC name: N-[(15S,16R)-10-oxo-8,18-dioxa-11-azatetracyclo[17.2.2.0^{2,7}.0^{11,16}]tricosa-2,4,6-trien-15-yl]methanesulfonamide
- CAS Number: 2648347-56-0
- PubChem CID: 156417714
- IUPHAR/BPS: 13879
- UNII: 3BRW4ARU66
- KEGG: D13336

Chemical and physical data
- Formula: C_{21}H_{30}N_{2}O_{5}S
- Molar mass: 422.54 g·mol^{−1}
- 3D model (JSmol): Interactive image
- SMILES: O=C1N2CCC[C@@H]([C@@H]2CO[C@@H]3CC[C@@H](CC3)C4=C(OC1)C=CC=C4)NS(=O)(C)=O
- InChI: InChI=1S/C21H30N2O5S/c1-29(25,26)22-18-6-4-12-23-19(18)13-27-16-10-8-15(9-11-16)17-5-2-3-7-20(17)28-14-21(23)24/h2-3,5,7,15-16,18-19,22H,4,6,8-14H2,1H3/t15?,16?,18-,19-/m0/s1; Key:IHNJMACFBQEKRJ-VHZYLWGESA-N

Alixorexton (INN; developmental code name ALKS-2680) is an orexin receptor agonist which is under development for the treatment of sleep disorders, including narcolepsy and idiopathic hypersomnia. Alixorexton is being developed by Alkermes As of July 2025, it is in phase 2 clinical trials with planned advancement to a phase 3 study for the treatment of narcolepsy type 1.

== See also ==
- Orexin receptor § Agonists
- List of investigational narcolepsy and hypersomnia drugs
