= Suntinorexton =

Chemical compound

Clinical data
- Drug class: Orexin OX_{2} receptor agonist

Identifiers
- IUPAC name: N-[(2S,3S)-2-[[2-fluoro-3-(3-fluorophenyl)phenyl]methyl]-1-(2-hydroxy-2-methylpropanoyl)pyrrolidin-3-yl]ethanesulfonamide
- CAS Number: 2274802-89-8
- PubChem CID: 137460941
- UNII: FF2NQ35DA4

Chemical and physical data
- Formula: C_{23}H_{28}F_{2}N_{2}O_{4}S
- Molar mass: 466.54 g·mol^{−1}
- 3D model (JSmol): Interactive image
- SMILES: CCS(=O)(=O)N[C@H]1CCN([C@H]1CC2=C(C(=CC=C2)C3=CC(=CC=C3)F)F)C(=O)C(C)(C)O
- InChI: InChI=1S/C23H28F2N2O4S/c1-4-32(30,31)26-19-11-12-27(22(28)23(2,3)29)20(19)14-16-8-6-10-18(21(16)25)15-7-5-9-17(24)13-15/h5-10,13,19-20,26,29H,4,11-12,14H2,1-3H3/t19-,20-/m0/s1; Key:MQDUVMBBJZLFHF-PMACEKPBSA-N

Suntinorexton (INN) is an experimental orexin receptor agonist. It acts as a selective agonist of the orexin OX_{2} receptor and was described in 2019 in a patent by Takeda Pharmaceutical Company. It is being evaluated for the treatment of narcolepsy.

== See also ==
- Orexin receptor § Agonists
- List of investigational narcolepsy and hypersomnia drugs
