= Ledasorexton =

Clinical data
- Other names: E-2086; E2086
- Routes of administration: Oral
- Drug class: Orexin OX_{2} receptor agonist; Wakefulness-promoting agent

Identifiers
- IUPAC name: (2R)-2-cyclopropyl-2-[(1S,5R)-3-[(3S,4R)-1-(5-fluoropyrimidin-2-yl)-3-methoxypiperidin-4-yl]-8-azabicyclo[3.2.1]octan-8-yl]acetamide
- CAS Number: 2758363-88-9
- PubChem CID: 162702128
- ChemSpider: 133324961
- UNII: YF7U7E62EL
- ChEMBL: ChEMBL5795221

Chemical and physical data
- Formula: C_{22}H_{32}FN_{5}O_{2}
- Molar mass: 417.529 g·mol^{−1}
- 3D model (JSmol): Interactive image
- SMILES: CO[C@@H]1CN(CC[C@@H]1C2C[C@H]3CC[C@@H](C2)N3[C@H](C4CC4)C(=O)N)C5=NC=C(C=N5)F
- InChI: InChI=1S/C22H32FN5O2/c1-30-19-12-27(22-25-10-15(23)11-26-22)7-6-18(19)14-8-16-4-5-17(9-14)28(16)20(21(24)29)13-2-3-13/h10-11,13-14,16-20H,2-9,12H2,1H3,(H2,24,29)/t14?,16-,17+,18-,19-,20-/m1/s1; Key:AXOUSJFGEOVDQT-GFVFYWETSA-N

Ledasorexton (INN; developmental code name E-2086) is a selective orexin OX_{2} receptor agonist which is under development for the treatment of narcolepsy. It is taken orally. The drug is under development by Eisai. As of May 2026, it is in phase 2 clinical trials for narcolepsy.

== See also ==
- List of investigational narcolepsy and hypersomnia drugs
