= Cleminorexton =

Clinical data
- Other names: ORX750; ORX-750
- Routes of administration: Oral
- Drug class: Orexin receptor agonist; Orexin OX_{2} receptor agonist; Wakefulness-promoting agent

Identifiers
- IUPAC name: 1-fluoro-N-[(16S,17S)-4,6,23-trifluoro-11-oxo-8-oxa-12-azatetracyclo[17.3.1.0^{2,7}.0^{12,17}]tricosa-1(22),2(7),3,5,19(23),20-hexaen-16-yl]cyclopropane-1-sulfonamide
- CAS Number: 2980518-93-0
- PubChem CID: 176507653
- ChemSpider: 133326679
- UNII: AL84E4VK26
- KEGG: D13371

Chemical and physical data
- Formula: C_{24}H_{24}F_{4}N_{2}O_{4}S
- Molar mass: 512.52 g·mol^{−1}
- 3D model (JSmol): Interactive image
- SMILES: C1C[C@@H]([C@@H]2CC3=C(C(=CC=C3)C4=C(C(=CC(=C4)F)F)OCCC(=O)N2C1)F)NS(=O)(=O)C5(CC5)F
- InChI: InChI=1S/C24H24F4N2O4S/c25-15-12-17-16-4-1-3-14(22(16)27)11-20-19(29-35(32,33)24(28)7-8-24)5-2-9-30(20)21(31)6-10-34-23(17)18(26)13-15/h1,3-4,12-13,19-20,29H,2,5-11H2/t19-,20-/m0/s1; Key:XGXKCWFIUAZZRS-PMACEKPBSA-N

Cleminorexton (INN; former developmental code name ORX750) is an orexin OX_{2} receptor agonist which is under development for the treatment of narcolepsy and idiopathic hypersomnia. It is taken orally. The drug was originated by Orexia, was subsequently developed by Centessa Pharmaceuticals, and is now being developed by Eli Lilly and Company. As of November 2025, it is in phase 2 clinical trials for narcolepsy and idiopathic hypersomnia.

== See also ==
- List of investigational narcolepsy and hypersomnia drugs
