= Balumorexton =

Clinical data
- Other names: TAK-360; TAK360
- Routes of administration: Oral
- Drug class: Orexin OX_{2} receptor antagonist; Wakefulness-promoting agent

Identifiers
- IUPAC name: N-[(6R)-7,7-difluoro-2-[5-fluoro-4-(2,4,6-trifluorophenyl)-1,2-benzoxazol-3-yl]-3-oxo-5,6-dihydropyrrolo[1,2-c]imidazol-6-yl]methanesulfonamide
- CAS Number: 3037907-48-2
- PubChem CID: 171548344
- UNII: NE3ZS9HSP2

Chemical and physical data
- Formula: C_{20}H_{12}F_{6}N_{4}O_{4}S
- Molar mass: 518.39 g·mol^{−1}
- 3D model (JSmol): Interactive image
- SMILES: CS(=O)(=O)N[C@@H]1CN2C(=CN(C2=O)C3=NOC4=C3C(=C(C=C4)F)C5=C(C=C(C=C5F)F)F)C1(F)F
- InChI: InChI=1S/C20H12F6N4O4S/c1-35(32,33)28-13-6-29-14(20(13,25)26)7-30(19(29)31)18-17-12(34-27-18)3-2-9(22)16(17)15-10(23)4-8(21)5-11(15)24/h2-5,7,13,28H,6H2,1H3/t13-/m1/s1; Key:QYIMOBVUEGPQSO-CYBMUJFWSA-N

Balumorexton (INN; likely developmental code name TAK-360) is a selective orexin OX_{2} receptor agonist which is under development for the treatment of narcolepsy and idiopathic hypersomnia. It is taken orally. The drug is under development by Takeda. As of June 2025, it is in phase 2 clinical trials for both narcolepsy and idiopathic hypersomnia.

== See also ==
- List of investigational narcolepsy and hypersomnia drugs
