= Firazorexton =

Chemical compound

Clinical data
- Other names: TAK-994
- Drug class: Orexin OX_{2} receptor agonist; Wakefulness-promoting agent

Identifiers
- IUPAC name: N-[(2S,3S)-2-[[3-(3,5-difluorophenyl)-2-fluorophenyl]methyl]-1-(2-hydroxy-2-methylpropanoyl)pyrrolidin-3-yl]methanesulfonamide
- CAS Number: 2274802-95-6
- PubChem CID: 137460733
- ChemSpider: 115009503
- UNII: U9MOX60GHD

Chemical and physical data
- Formula: C_{22}H_{25}F_{3}N_{2}O_{4}S
- Molar mass: 470.51 g·mol^{−1}
- 3D model (JSmol): Interactive image
- SMILES: CC(C)(C(=O)N1CC[C@@H]([C@@H]1CC2=C(C(=CC=C2)C3=CC(=CC(=C3)F)F)F)NS(=O)(=O)C)O
- InChI: InChI=1S/C22H25F3N2O4S/c1-22(2,29)21(28)27-8-7-18(26-32(3,30)31)19(27)11-13-5-4-6-17(20(13)25)14-9-15(23)12-16(24)10-14/h4-6,9-10,12,18-19,26,29H,7-8,11H2,1-3H3/t18-,19-/m0/s1; Key:VOSAWOSMGPKQEQ-OALUTQOASA-N

Firazorexton (INN; development code TAK-994) is an experimental orexin 2 (OX_{2}) receptor agonist first described in a 2019 patent filed by Takeda Pharmaceutical Company.

Firazorexton was studied by Takeda for the treatment of narcolepsy. It is a small-molecule and orally active compound and acts as a highly selective agonist of the orexin receptor 2 (OX_{2}) with >700-fold selectivity over the orexin receptor 1 (OX_{1}). Firazorexton is related to danavorexton (TAK-925).

The compound reached phase 2 clinical trials for narcolepsy. However, clinical development was discontinued in October 2021 for safety reasons. More specifically, it produced severe drug-induced liver injury in phase 2 trials. This hepatotoxicity is unlikely to be related to firazorexton's orexin receptor agonism.

== See also ==
- Orexin receptor § Agonists
- List of investigational narcolepsy and hypersomnia drugs
