= C24H25FN4O2 =

The molecular formula C_{24}H_{25}FN_{4}O_{2} (molar mass: 420.479 g/mol) may refer to:

- Filorexant (MK-6096)
- Ocaperidone
