= SB-649868 =

Chemical compound

Clinical data
- ATC code: None

Legal status
- Legal status: Investigational

Identifiers
- IUPAC name: N-([(2S)-1-([5-(4-fluorophenyl)-2-methyl-4-thiazolyl]carbonyl)-2-piperidinyl]methyl)-4-benzofurancarboxamide
- CAS Number: 380899-24-1
- PubChem CID: 25195495
- ChemSpider: 25069706
- UNII: 1L1V1K2M4V
- ChEMBL: ChEMBL1272307
- CompTox Dashboard (EPA): DTXSID90191491

Chemical and physical data
- Formula: C_{26}H_{24}FN_{3}O_{3}S
- Molar mass: 477.55 g·mol^{−1}
- 3D model (JSmol): Interactive image
- SMILES: CC1=NC(=C(S1)C2=CC=C(C=C2)F)C(=O)N3CCCC[C@H]3CNC(=O)C4=C5C=COC5=CC=C4
- InChI: InChI=1S/C26H24FN3O3S/c1-16-29-23(24(34-16)17-8-10-18(27)11-9-17)26(32)30-13-3-2-5-19(30)15-28-25(31)21-6-4-7-22-20(21)12-14-33-22/h4,6-12,14,19H,2-3,5,13,15H2,1H3,(H,28,31)/t19-/m0/s1; Key:ZJXIUGNEAIHSBI-IBGZPJMESA-N

SB-649868 is a dual orexin receptor antagonist that was being developed by GlaxoSmithKline as a treatment for insomnia.

A phase I clinical trial evaluated doses up to 80 mg, resulting in significant improvement in sleep latency without adverse effects. In randomized, double-blind, placebo-controlled crossover trials, the 10 and 30 mg doses increased sleep time and reduced sleep latency. The subsequent phase II study added a 60 mg dose and observed dose-dependent sleep promotion.

The compound no longer appears to be under active development, with the last study posted to ClinicalTrials.gov completed in 2010.

== See also ==
- Almorexant
- Filorexant
- Lemborexant
- Suvorexant
