= SB-408124 =

Chemical compound

Identifiers
- IUPAC name: 1-(6,8-difluoro-2-methylquinolin-4-yl)-3-[4-(dimethylamino)phenyl]urea
- CAS Number: 288150-92-5
- PubChem CID: 4331799
- IUPHAR/BPS: 1704
- ChemSpider: 3536200
- UNII: C3YT74C744
- CompTox Dashboard (EPA): DTXSID20402022
- ECHA InfoCard: 100.164.461

Chemical and physical data
- Formula: C_{19}H_{18}F_{2}N_{4}O
- Molar mass: 356.377 g·mol^{−1}
- 3D model (JSmol): Interactive image
- SMILES: c3cc(N(C)C)ccc3NC(=O)Nc1cc(C)nc2c1cc(F)cc2F
- InChI: InChI=1S/C19H18F2N4O/c1-11-8-17(15-9-12(20)10-16(21)18(15)22-11)24-19(26)23-13-4-6-14(7-5-13)25(2)3/h4-10H,1-3H3,(H2,22,23,24,26); Key:JTARFZSNUAGHRB-UHFFFAOYSA-N

SB-408124 is a drug which is a non-peptide antagonist selective for the orexin receptor subtype OX_{1}, with around 70x selectivity for OX_{1} over OX_{2} receptors, and improved oral bioavailability compared to the older OX_{1} antagonist SB-334867. It is used in scientific research into the function of orexinergic neurons in the body.
