= Samelisant =

Experimental drug to treat narcolepsy

Clinical data
- Other names: SUVN-G3031
- Drug class: Histamine H_{3} receptor inverse agonist; Wakefulness-promoting agent

Pharmacokinetic data
- Elimination half-life: 23-34 hours

Identifiers
- IUPAC name: N-[4-(1-cyclobutylpiperidin-4-yl)oxyphenyl]-2-morpholin-4-ylacetamide
- CAS Number: 1394808-82-2
- PubChem CID: 60151477
- IUPHAR/BPS: 10232
- DrugBank: DB14835
- ChemSpider: 64854818
- UNII: 65V47O9NOP
- ChEMBL: ChEMBL4297328

Chemical and physical data
- Formula: C_{21}H_{31}N_{3}O_{3}
- Molar mass: 373.497 g·mol^{−1}
- 3D model (JSmol): Interactive image
- SMILES: C1CC(C1)N2CCC(CC2)OC3=CC=C(C=C3)NC(=O)CN4CCOCC4
- InChI: InChI=1S/C21H31N3O3/c25-21(16-23-12-14-26-15-13-23)22-17-4-6-19(7-5-17)27-20-8-10-24(11-9-20)18-2-1-3-18/h4-7,18,20H,1-3,8-16H2,(H,22,25); Key:LNXDUSQEXVQFGP-UHFFFAOYSA-N

Samelisant (INN; developmental code name SUVN-G3031) is an experimental wakefulness-promoting agent acting as a selective histamine H_{3} receptor inverse agonist which is under development for the treatment of narcolepsy. It was also under development for the treatment of cognition disorders and Parkinson's disease, but no recent development has been reported for these indications. As of June 2024, samelisant is in phase 2 clinical trials for the treatment of narcolepsy.

== See also ==
- List of investigational cognition and memory disorder drugs
- List of investigational narcolepsy and hypersomnia drugs
- Pitolisant
