= EMPA (drug) =

Chemical compound

Clinical data
- ATC code: none

Identifiers
- IUPAC name: N-Ethyl-N^{2}-(6-methoxy-3-pyridinyl)-N^{2}-[(2-methylphenyl)sulfonyl]-N-(3-pyridinylmethyl)glycinamide
- CAS Number: 680590-49-2
- PubChem CID: 9981404
- ChemSpider: 8156996
- UNII: VT87V86D7W
- CompTox Dashboard (EPA): DTXSID101045254
- ECHA InfoCard: 100.233.393

Chemical and physical data
- Formula: C_{23}H_{26}N_{4}O_{4}S
- Molar mass: 454.55 g·mol^{−1}
- 3D model (JSmol): Interactive image
- SMILES: CCN(CC1=CN=CC=C1)C(=O)CN(C2=CN=C(C=C2)OC)S(=O)(=O)C3=CC=CC=C3C
- InChI: InChI=1S/C23H26N4O4S/c1-4-26(16-19-9-7-13-24-14-19)23(28)17-27(20-11-12-22(31-3)25-15-20)32(29,30)21-10-6-5-8-18(21)2/h5-15H,4,16-17H2,1-3H3; Key:KJPHTXTWFHVJIG-UHFFFAOYSA-N

EMPA (Note: Abbreviation related to possible chem. name N-ethyl-2-[(6-methoxypyridin-3-yl)(toluene-2-sulfonyl)amino]-N-(pyridin-3-ylmethyl)acetamide.) is a selective antagonist of the OX_{2} receptor, with 900-fold selectivity in binding for OX_{2} over OX_{1}.

== See also ==
- TCS-OX2-29
