= Danavorexton =

Chemical compound

Clinical data
- Other names: TAK-925
- Routes of administration: Intravenous
- Drug class: Orexin receptor agonist; Orexin OX_{2} receptor agonist; Wakefulness-promoting agent

Pharmacokinetic data
- Elimination half-life: ~3.3–5.1 hours

Identifiers
- IUPAC name: methyl (2R,3S)-3-(methanesulfonamido)-2-[(cis-4-phenylcyclohexyl)oxymethyl]piperidine-1-carboxylate
- CAS Number: 2114324-48-8
- PubChem CID: 130310079
- ChemSpider: 68011464
- UNII: 1QMD83K4YN
- ChEMBL: ChEMBL4650341
- PDB ligand: A6F (PDBe, RCSB PDB)
- CompTox Dashboard (EPA): DTXSID401336757

Chemical and physical data
- Formula: C_{21}H_{32}N_{2}O_{5}S
- Molar mass: 424.56 g·mol^{−1}
- 3D model (JSmol): Interactive image
- SMILES: COC(=O)N1CCC[C@H](NS(C)(=O)=O)[C@@H]1CO[C@H]1CC[C@H](CC1)C1=CC=CC=C1
- InChI: InChI=1S/C21H32N2O5S/c1-27-21(24)23-14-6-9-19(22-29(2,25)26)20(23)15-28-18-12-10-17(11-13-18)16-7-4-3-5-8-16/h3-5,7-8,17-20,22H,6,9-15H2,1-2H3/t17-,18+,19-,20-/m0/s1; Key:UXZAJSZFFARTEI-YRPNKDGESA-N

Danavorexton (developmental code name TAK-925) is a selective orexin 2 receptor agonist. It is a small-molecule compound and is administered intravenously. The compound was found to dose-dependently produce wakefulness to a similar degree as modafinil in a phase 1 clinical trial. As of March 2021, danavorexton is under development for the treatment of narcolepsy, idiopathic hypersomnia, and sleep apnea. It is related to another orexin receptor agonist, firazorexton (TAK-994), the development of which was discontinued for safety reasons in October 2021.

== See also ==
- Orexin receptor § Agonists
- List of investigational narcolepsy and hypersomnia drugs
