= TCS-OX2-29 =

Orexin antagonist

Identifiers
- IUPAC name: (2S)-1-(6,7-dimethoxy-3,4-dihydro-1H-isoquinolin-2-yl)-3,3-dimethyl-2-(pyridin-4-ylmethylamino)butan-1-one
- CAS Number: 372523-75-6
- PubChem CID: 10408514
- IUPHAR/BPS: 4038
- UNII: KH2US47J8R
- CompTox Dashboard (EPA): DTXSID801028419

Chemical and physical data
- Formula: C_{23}H_{31}N_{3}O_{3}
- Molar mass: 397.519 g·mol^{−1}
- 3D model (JSmol): Interactive image
- SMILES: c3cnccc3CNC(C(C)(C)C)C(=O)N(Cc2cc1OC)CCc2cc1OC

TCS-OX2-29 is an orexin antagonist. It was the first non-peptide antagonist developed that is selective for the orexin receptor subtype OX_{2}, with an IC_{50} of 40nM and selectivity of around 250x for OX_{2} over OX_{1} receptors. Orexin antagonists are expected to be useful for the treatment of insomnia, with subtype-selective antagonists such as TCS-OX2-29 potentially offering more specificity of action compared to non-selective orexin antagonists like almorexant.
