= Orexin-A =

Stimulating neuropeptide

Orexin-A, also known as hypocretin-1, is a naturally occurring neuropeptide and orexin isoform. The orexinergic nucleus in the lateral hypothalamus is the primary orexin projection system in the brain.

== Structure ==
Orexin-A is a peptide composed of 33 amino acids including an N-terminal pyroglutamyl residue and two intramolecular disulfide bridges between cysteine residues in 6 and 12 and 7 and 14 positions.

The amino acid sequence is: Pyroglu-Pro-Leu-Pro-Asp-Cys-Cys-Arg-Gln-Lys-Thr-Cys-Ser-Cys-Arg-Leu-Tyr-Glu-Leu-Leu-His-Gly-Ala-Gly-Asn-His-Ala-Ala-Gly-Ile-Leu-Thr-Leu.

== Mechanism ==
Orexins are highly excitatory neuropeptides that were first discovered in the brains of rats. It is a peptide that is produced by a very small population of cells in the lateral and posterior hypothalamus. Orexins strongly excite various brain nuclei (neurons) to affect an organism's wakefulness by affecting their dopamine, norepinephrine, histamine and acetylcholine systems.

These systems work together to stabilize the organism's sleep cycles. Once made, the orexin peptides can bind to the orexin receptor; which is a G protein-coupled receptor. This receptor senses molecules outside the cell and activates inside signal transduction pathways to elicit cellular responses.

Research shows that an absence of orexin-A appears to cause narcolepsy. Deficit amounts of orexin-A will make people sleepy and research suggests that by adding it back into the brain, narcoleptic effects will be reduced. The research determined how glucose inhibited a particular class of glucose-sensing neurons, which produce orexins. However, it is unknown how glucose suppresses the electrical activity of orexin cells.

A study from the University of Manchester discovered how glucose-inhibited neurons affected the regulation of sleep cycles. Tests show a class of potassium ion channels, pore-like proteins in the cell membrane, affect the cellular responses by controlling the flow of potassium into the cell. The exact mechanism of the potassium ion channels is unknown, but the experiments show that the presence of glucose inhibited the orexin neurons by acting on this class of potassium ion channels known as "tandem pore" channels.

== Ongoing research ==
The subjects of one particular study, rhesus monkeys, were deprived of sleep in durations of 30 to 36 hours, and were immediately assessed in short term memory tasks. The rhesus monkeys were split into a test group and into a control group. The test group was administered orexin-A, intravenously or nasally. The control group was given a placebo. The sleep-deprived monkeys which were given the nasal form of orexin-A performed far better than the ones treated with injections. Orexin-A not only restored the monkeys' cognitive abilities but made their brains appear awake in PET scans. The same was not true for the control group, which did not exhibit any changes.
