= List of investigational narcolepsy and hypersomnia drugs =

Investigational narcolepsy and hypersomnia drugs

This is a list of investigational narcolepsy and hypersomnia drugs, or drugs that are currently under development for clinical use for the treatment of narcolepsy and/or hypersomnia (e.g., excessive daytime sleepiness, idiopathic hypersomnia) but are not yet approved. Many of them may also be referred to as investigational wakefulness-promoting agents (WPAs).

Chemical/generic names are listed first, with developmental code names, synonyms, and brand names in parentheses. The format of list items is "Name (Synonyms) – Mechanism of Action – Indication [Reference]".

This list was last comprehensively updated in September 2025. It is likely to become outdated with time.

== Under development ==
=== Preregistration ===
- Reboxetine (AXS-12) – norepinephrine reuptake inhibitor (NRI) – narcolepsy
- Sodium oxybate (Xyrem) controlled release (TRN-257) – GABA_{B} receptor agonist and GHB receptor agonist – narcolepsy, idiopathic hypersomnia

=== Phase 3 ===
- Alixorexton (ALKS-2680) – orexin OX_{2} receptor agonist – narcolepsy
- Pitolisant (BF-2.649; BF-2649; HBS-201; Ozawade; tiprolisant; Wakix) – histamine H_{3} receptor antagonist – idiopathic hypersomnia
- Sodium oxybate micropump (FT-218; Lumryz; ON-SXB) – GABA_{B} receptor agonist and GHB receptor agonist – idiopathic hypersomnia

=== Phase 2/3 ===
- Balumorexton (TAK-360) – orexin OX_{2} receptor agonist – narcolepsy, idiopathic hypersomnia

=== Phase 2 ===
- Alixorexton (ALKS-2680) – orexin OX_{2} receptor agonist – idiopathic hypersomnia
- Cleminorexton (ORX750; ORX-750) – orexin OX_{2} receptor agonist – narcolepsy, idiopathic hypersomnia
- Firazorexton (TAK-994) – orexin OX_{2} receptor agonist – narcolepsy
- Flecainide/modafinil (THN-102) – combination of flecainide (sodium channel blocker) and modafinil (atypical dopamine reuptake inhibitor) – narcolepsy
- Ledasorexton (E-2086) – orexin OX_{2} receptor agonist – narcolepsy
- Mazindol controlled release (NLS-0; NLS-1; NLS-10; NLS-13; NLS-2; Nolazol; Quilience) – serotonin–norepinephrine–dopamine reuptake inhibitor (SNDRI) – narcolepsy, idiopathic hypersomnia
- Pentylenetetrazole (BTD-001; pentetrazol; PTZ) – GABA_{A} receptor antagonist – narcolepsy, idiopathic hypersomnia
- Samelisant (SUVN-G3031) – histamine H_{3} receptor antagonist – narcolepsy
- Serdexmethylphenidate (KP-484; KP-1077; KP-879) – norepinephrine–dopamine reuptake inhibitor (NDRI) – idiopathic hypersomnia

=== Phase 1/2 ===
- Serdexmethylphenidate (KP-484; KP-1077; KP-879) – norepinephrine–dopamine reuptake inhibitor (NDRI) – narcolepsy

=== Phase 1 ===
- Lu-AH69593 – undefined mechanism of action – narcolepsy
- MK-6552 – undefined mechanism of action – narcolepsy
- ORX-142 – orexin OX_{2} receptor agonist
- Sodium oxybate once-nightly – GABA_{B} receptor agonist and GHB receptor agonist – narcolepsy
- Valiloxybate (XW-10172) – GABA_{B} receptor agonist and GHB receptor agonist – narcolepsy

=== Preclinical ===
- AEX-2 – orexin OX_{1} and OX_{2} receptor agonist – narcolepsy
- HBS-102 (CSTI-100) – melanin-concentrating hormone receptor 1 (MCHR1) antagonist – narcolepsy
- Methylphenidate transdermal (Defent) – norepinephrine–dopamine reuptake inhibitor (NDRI) – narcolepsy
- NLS-11 – undefined mechanism of action – Kleine–Levin syndrome

=== Research ===
- AEX-19 – orexin OX_{1} and OX_{2} receptor agonist – narcolepsy, idiopathic hypersomnia
- SPN-446 – undefined mechanism of action – narcolepsy

== Not under development ==
=== No development reported ===
- Armesocarb (MLR-1019; (R)-mesocarb) – atypical dopamine reuptake inhibitor (DRI) – sleep disorders
- Danavorexton (TAK-925) – orexin OX_{2} receptor agonist – idiopathic hypersomnia
- Flecainide/modafinil (THN-102) – combination of flecainide (sodium channel blocker) and modafinil (atypical dopamine reuptake inhibitor (DRI)) – hypersomnia
- Flmodafinil (CRL-40,940; NLS-14; NLS-4; JBG01-41; bisfluoromodafinil; lauflumide) – atypical dopamine reuptake inhibitor (DRI) – idiopathic hypersomnia
- Golexanolone (GR-3027) – GABA_{A} receptor negative allosteric modulator and neurosteroid – idiopathic hypersomnia
- GSK-189254 (GSK-189254A) – histamine H_{3} receptor antagonist – narcolepsy
- JZP-386 (C-10323; deuterated sodium oxybate; deuterated GHB) – GABA_{B} receptor agonist and GHB receptor agonist – narcolepsy
- Research programme: neurological diseases therapies - Inexia/Nxera Pharma – orexin OX_{1} and OX_{2} receptor agonists – narcolepsy
- Research programme: small molecule therapeutics - Orexia/X-Chem – orexin OX_{2} receptor agonists
- SLS-010 – histamine H_{3} receptor antagonist – narcolepsy
- Sodium oxybate controlled release (GHB) – GABA_{B} receptor agonist and GHB receptor agonist – narcolepsy
- Solriamfetol (YKP-10A; YKP10A; R–228060) – undefined mechanism of action – narcolepsy
- Valiloxibic acid (XWL-008) – undefined mechanism of action – narcolepsy

=== Discontinued ===
- ABT-652 – histamine H_{3} receptor modulator – sleep disorders
- Bavisant (BEN-2001; JNJ-1074; JNJ-31001074) – histamine H_{3} receptor antagonist – narcolepsy
- Cipralisant (GT-2331; Perceptin) – histamine H_{3} receptor antagonist – sleep disorders
- Danavorexton (TAK-925) – orexin OX_{2} receptor agonist – narcolepsy
- Enerisant (TS-091; TS-0911; TS091) – histamine H_{3} receptor antagonist – narcolepsy and hypersomnia
- Flmodafinil (CRL-40,940; NLS-14; NLS-4; JBG01-41; bisfluoromodafinil; lauflumide) – atypical dopamine reuptake inhibitor (DRI) – narcolepsy
- JNJ-17216498 – histamine H_{3} receptor antagonist – narcolepsy
- Lisdexamfetamine (LDX; Elvanse; NRP-104; S-877489; SHP-489; SPD-489; Tyvense; Venvanse; Vyvanse) – norepinephrine–dopamine releasing agent (NDRA) – sleep disorders
- LML-134 (LML134) – histamine H_{3} receptor antagonist – sleep disorders
- Oveporexton (TAK-861) – orexin OX_{2} receptor agonist – idiopathic hypersomnia
- Phacetoperane (NLS-3) – norepinephrine–dopamine reuptake inhibitor (NDRI) – narcolepsy
- Research programme: sleep disorder therapeutics - Servier (S-41150) – histamine H_{3} receptor antagonist – sleep disorders
- SAR-152954 (SAR152954) – histamine H_{3} receptor antagonist – sleep disorders
- Ulotaront (SEP-363856; SEP-856) – trace amine-associated receptor 1 (TAAR1) agonist and serotonin 5-HT_{1A} and 5-HT_{1D} receptor partial agonist – narcolepsy

=== Formal development never or not yet started ===
- Mevidalen (LY-3154207; D1 PAM) – dopamine D_{1} receptor positive allosteric modulator

== Clinically used drugs ==
=== Approved drugs ===
==== Catecholaminergic agents ====
- Armodafinil (CEP-10953; Nuvigil; (R)-modafinil) – atypical dopamine reuptake inhibitor (DRI) – hypersomnia
- Modafinil (AFT-801; Alertec; Attenace; CN-801; CRL-40476; Modasamil; Modasonil; Modavigil; Modiodal; Provigil; Sparlon; Vigil) – atypical dopamine reuptake inhibitor (DRI) – narcolepsy, hypersomnia
- Solriamfetol (ADX-N05; ARL-N05; JZP-110; SKL-N05; Sunosi) – atypical norepinephrine–dopamine reuptake inhibitor (NDRI) and trace amine-associated receptor 1 (TAAR1) agonist – hypersomnia

==== Oxybate/GHB drugs ====
- Calcium/magnesium/potassium/sodium oxybates (GHB; JZP-258; Xywav; oxybate mixed salt solution; lower-sodium oxybate) – GABA_{B} receptor agonist and GHB receptor agonist – narcolepsy and idiopathic hypersomnia
- Sodium oxybate (GHB; JZP-6; KEY-10; Xyrem) – GABA_{B} receptor agonist and GHB receptor agonist – narcolepsy
- Sodium oxybate (GHB; FT-218; Lumryz; ON-SXB) – GABA_{B} receptor agonist and GHB receptor agonist – narcolepsy

==== Histamine H_{3} receptor antagonists ====
- Pitolisant (BF-2.649; BF-2649; HBS-201; Ozawade; tiprolisant; Wakix) – histamine H_{3} receptor antagonist – narcolepsy, hypersomnia

==== Orexin receptor agonists ====
- Oveporexton (Orzeyful; TAK-861) – orexin OX_{2} receptor agonist – narcolepsy

=== Discontinued drugs ===
- Adrafinil (Olmifon; CRL-40028; N-hydroxymodafinil) – atypical dopamine reuptake inhibitor (DRI) (modafinil prodrug) – hypersomnia

=== Off-label drugs ===
- Adenosine receptor antagonists (e.g., caffeine)
- Norepinephrine releasing agents (NRAs) (e.g., ephedrine, selegiline (via metabolites))
- Norepinephrine reuptake inhibitors (NRIs) (e.g., atomoxetine, reboxetine, viloxazine)
- Norepinephrine–dopamine reuptake inhibitors (NDRIs) (e.g., bupropion, nomifensine, amineptine)
- Serotonin–norepinephrine–dopamine reuptake inhibitors (SNDRIs) (e.g., mazindol)
- Stimulants (norepinephrine–dopamine releasing agents and/or reuptake inhibitors (NDRAs/NDRIs)) (e.g., amphetamine, methamphetamine, lisdexamfetamine, methylphenidate, pemoline)

== See also ==
- List of investigational drugs
- List of investigational insomnia drugs
- List of investigational chronobiotics
- Wakefulness-promoting agent
- Stimulant
