= JNJ-10397049 =

Chemical compound

Clinical data
- ATC code: none

Identifiers
- IUPAC name: 1-(2,4-dibromophenyl)-3-((4S,5S)-2,2-dimethyl-4-phenyl-1,3-dioxan-5-yl)urea
- CAS Number: 708275-58-5
- PubChem CID: 9869934
- IUPHAR/BPS: 1701
- ChemSpider: 8045625
- UNII: 1B419P24AV
- ChEMBL: ChEMBL359632
- CompTox Dashboard (EPA): DTXSID501336831

Chemical and physical data
- Formula: C_{19}H_{20}Br_{2}N_{2}O_{3}
- Molar mass: 484.188 g·mol^{−1}
- 3D model (JSmol): Interactive image
- SMILES: BrC1=CC=C(NC(N[C@@H]2[C@H](C3=CC=CC=C3)OC(C)(C)OC2)=O)C(Br)=C1
- InChI: InChI=1S/C19H20Br2N2O3/c1-19(2)25-11-16(17(26-19)12-6-4-3-5-7-12)23-18(24)22-15-9-8-13(20)10-14(15)21/h3-10,16-17H,11H2,1-2H3,(H2,22,23,24)/t16-,17-/m0/s1; Key:RBKIJGLHFFQHBE-IRXDYDNUSA-N

JNJ-10397049 is a potent and highly selective OX_{2} receptor antagonist. In animals, JNJ-10397049 was found to have sleep-promoting effects and to attenuate the reinforcing effects of ethanol.
