= Filorexant =

Chemical compound

Clinical data
- Other names: MK-6096; MK6096
- Routes of administration: By mouth
- Drug class: Orexin antagonist
- ATC code: None

Pharmacokinetic data
- Elimination half-life: 3–6 hours

Identifiers
- IUPAC name: [(2R,5R)-5-{[(5-Fluoro-2-pyridinyl)oxy]methyl}-2-methyl-1-piperidinyl][5-methyl-2-(2-pyrimidinyl)phenyl]methanone
- CAS Number: 1088991-73-4
- PubChem CID: 25128145
- ChemSpider: 28528372
- UNII: E6BTT8VA5Z
- KEGG: D10345
- PDB ligand: NT5 (PDBe, RCSB PDB)
- CompTox Dashboard (EPA): DTXSID50148764
- ECHA InfoCard: 100.203.042

Chemical and physical data
- Formula: C_{24}H_{25}FN_{4}O_{2}
- Molar mass: 420.488 g·mol^{−1}
- 3D model (JSmol): Interactive image
- SMILES: C[C@@H]1CC[C@H](CN1C(=O)C2=C(C=CC(=C2)C)C3=NC=CC=N3)COC4=NC=C(C=C4)F
- InChI: InChI=1S/C24H25FN4O2/c1-16-4-8-20(23-26-10-3-11-27-23)21(12-16)24(30)29-14-18(6-5-17(29)2)15-31-22-9-7-19(25)13-28-22/h3-4,7-13,17-18H,5-6,14-15H2,1-2H3/t17-,18-/m1/s1; Key:NPFDWHQSDBWQLH-QZTJIDSGSA-N

Filorexant (INN, USAN; developmental code name MK-6096) is an orexin antagonist which was under development by Merck for the treatment of insomnia, depression, diabetic neuropathy, and migraine. It is a dual antagonist of the orexin OX_{1} and OX_{2} receptors. It has a relatively short elimination half-life of 3 to 6 hours. However, it dissociates slowly from the orexin receptors and may thereby have a longer duration. Possibly in relation to this, filorexant shows next-day somnolence similarly to suvorexant. In phase 2 clinical trials, filorexant was found to be effective in the treatment of insomnia, but was not effective in the treatment of major depressive disorder, painful diabetic neuropathy, or migraine. As of May 2015, filorexant was no longer listed on Merck's online development pipeline and hence development of the drug appears to have been discontinued. Development of filorexant may have been discontinued due to lack of differentiation from suvorexant (which was also developed by Merck).

== See also ==
- List of investigational insomnia drugs
