= SB-334867 =

Chemical compound

Identifiers
- IUPAC name: 1-(2-methylbenzoxazol-6-yl)-3-[1,5]naphthyridin-4-yl urea
- CAS Number: 249889-64-3
- PubChem CID: 6604926
- IUPHAR/BPS: 1703
- ChemSpider: 5037182
- ChEMBL: ChEMBL291536
- CompTox Dashboard (EPA): DTXSID901356447 DTXSID10947856, DTXSID901356447
- ECHA InfoCard: 100.164.490

Chemical and physical data
- Formula: C_{17}H_{13}N_{5}O_{2}
- Molar mass: 319.324 g·mol^{−1}
- 3D model (JSmol): Interactive image
- SMILES: O=C(Nc1c2ncccc2ncc1)Nc3ccc4nc(oc4c3)C
- InChI: InChI=1S/C17H13N5O2/c1-10-20-12-5-4-11(9-15(12)24-10)21-17(23)22-14-6-8-18-13-3-2-7-19-16(13)14/h2-9H,1H3,(H2,18,21,22,23); Key:AKMNUCBQGHFICM-UHFFFAOYSA-N

SB-334867 is an orexin antagonist. It was the first non-peptide antagonist developed that is selective for the orexin receptor subtype OX_{1}, with around 50x selectivity for OX_{1} over OX_{2} receptors. It has been shown to produce sedative and anorectic effects in animals, and has been useful in characterising the orexinergic regulation of brain systems involved with appetite and sleep, as well as other physiological processes. The hydrochloride salt of SB-334867 has been demonstrated to be hydrolytically unstable, both in solution and as the solid. Orexin antagonists have multiple potential clinical applications including the treatment of drug addiction, insomnia, obesity and diabetes.
