= Orexin receptor type 2 =

Protein-coding gene in the species Homo sapiens

HCRTR2
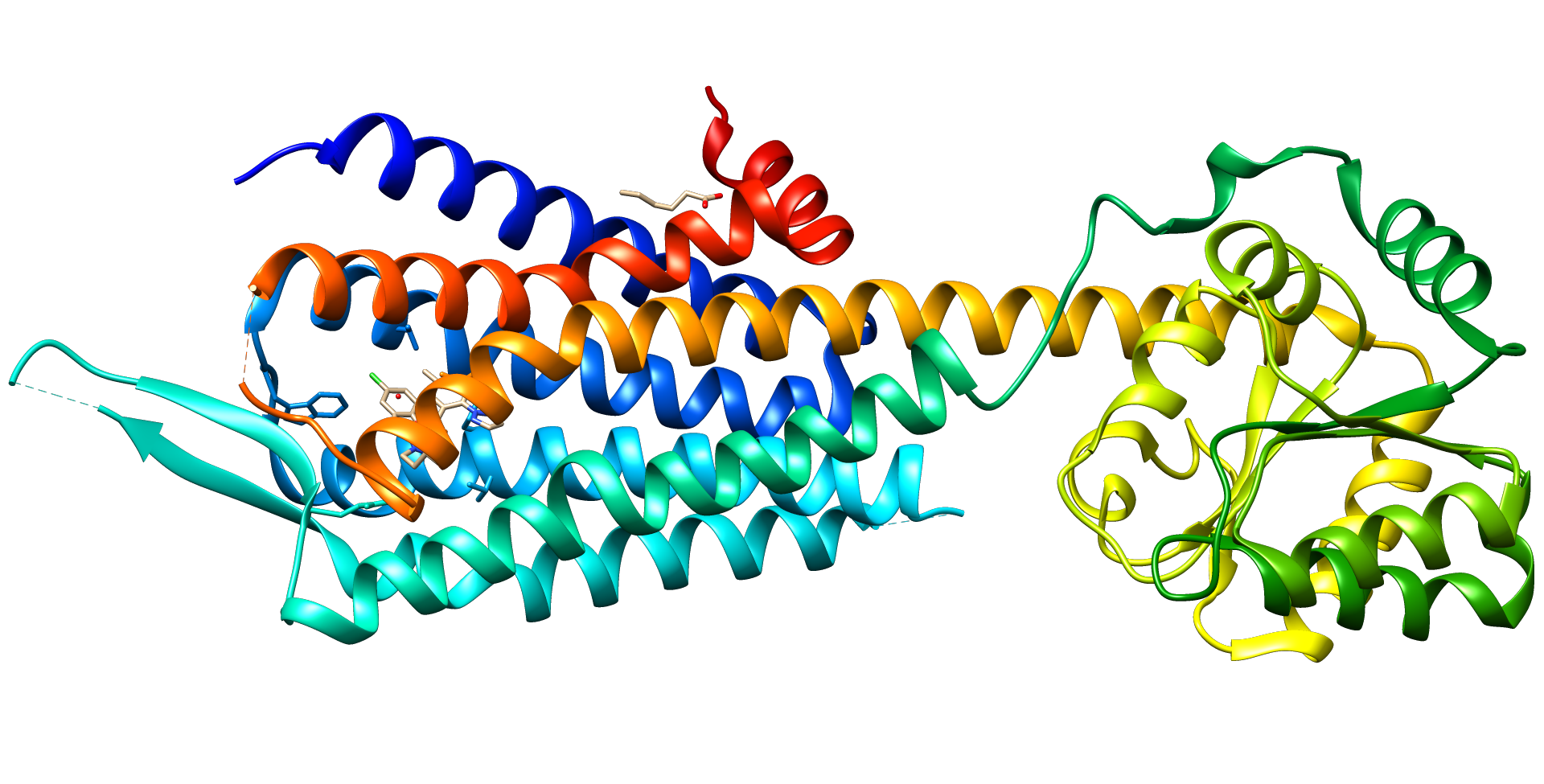

Identifiers
- Aliases: HCRTR2, OX2R, Hypocretin (orexin) receptor 2, hypocretin receptor 2, ORXR2, OXR2
- External IDs: OMIM: 602393; MGI: 2680765; GeneCards: HCRTR2
Available structures
PDB	Ortholog search: PDBe RCSB
PDB	List of PDB id codes 4S0V

Gene location (Human)
Chr.	Chromosome 6 (human)
Band	6p12.1	Start	55,106,460 bp
Band	6p12.1	End	55,282,617 bp

Gene location (Mouse)
Chr.	Chromosome 9 (mouse)
Band	9|9 D	Start	76,133,162 bp
Band	9|9 D	End	76,231,138 bp
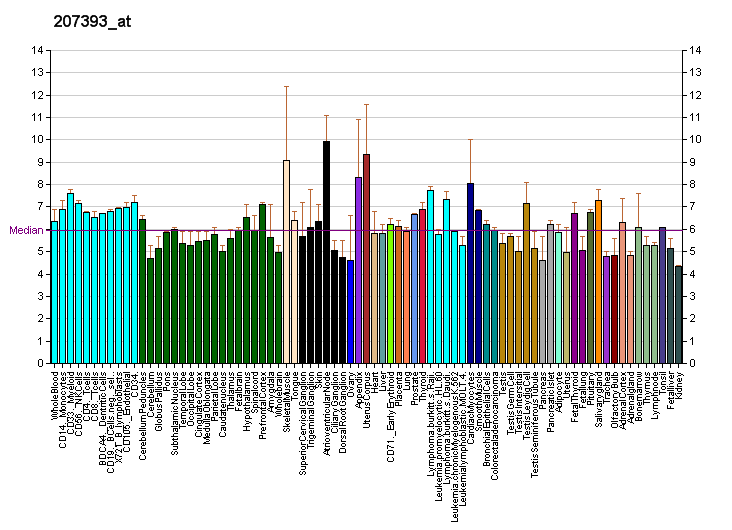
RNA expression pattern
Bgee	Human / Mouse (ortholog); Top expressed in: testicle; prefrontal cortex; pons; hypothalamus; Achilles tendon; gonad; Brodmann area 9; ventricular zone; superior vestibular nucleus; ganglionic eminence / Top expressed in: morula; embryo; spinal ganglia; pontine nuclei; dentate gyrus of hippocampal formation granule cell; primary visual cortex; neural tube; superior frontal gyrus; blastocyst; cerebellar cortex; More reference expression data
BioGPS	More reference expression data
Gene ontology
Molecular function	peptide hormone binding; peptide binding; G protein-coupled receptor activity; signal transducer activity; neuropeptide receptor activity; orexin receptor activity
Cellular component	integral component of membrane; plasma membrane; membrane; integral component of plasma membrane
Biological process	phospholipase C-activating G protein-coupled receptor signaling pathway; cellular response to hormone stimulus; regulation of circadian sleep/wake cycle, sleep; circadian sleep/wake cycle process; signal transduction; response to peptide; chemical synaptic transmission; regulation of cytosolic calcium ion concentration; regulation of circadian sleep/wake cycle, wakefulness; neuropeptide signaling pathway; feeding behavior; G protein-coupled receptor signaling pathway
Sources:Amigo / QuickGO
Orthologs
Databases	NCBI: entry; OMA: entry
Species	Human	Mouse
Entrez	3062	387285
Ensembl	ENSG00000137252	ENSMUSG00000032360
UniProt	O43614	P58308
RefSeq (mRNA)	NM_001526; NM_001384272	NM_198962; NM_001364551
RefSeq (protein)	NP_001517	NP_945200; NP_001351480
Location (UCSC)	Chr 6: 55.11 – 55.28 Mb	Chr 9: 76.13 – 76.23 Mb
PubMed search
- Wikidata
View/Edit Human	View/Edit Mouse

Orexin receptor type 2

Identifiers
- Symbol: Orexin_rec2
- Pfam: PF03827
- InterPro: IPR004060
Available protein structures:
- PDB: IPR004060 PF03827 (ECOD; PDBsum)
- AlphaFold: IPR004060; PF03827

Orexin receptor type 2 (Ox2R or OX_{2}), also known as hypocretin receptor type 2 (HcrtR2), is a protein that in humans is encoded by the HCRTR2 gene. It should not be confused for the protein CD200R1 which shares the alias OX2R but is a distinct, unrelated gene located on the human chromosome 3.

== Structure ==
The structure of the receptor has been solved to 2.5 Å resolution as a fusion protein bound to suvorexant using lipid-mediated crystallization.

== Function ==
OX_{2} is a G-protein coupled receptor expressed exclusively in the brain. It has 64% identity with OX_{1}. OX_{2} binds both orexin A and orexin B neuropeptides. OX_{2} is involved in the central feedback mechanism that regulates feeding behaviour. Mice with enhanced OX_{2} signaling are resistant to high-fat diet-induced obesity.

This receptor is activated by orexin, which is a wake-promoting hypothalamic neuropeptide that acts as a critical regulator of sleep in animals as Zebrafish or Mammals. This protein has mutations in Astyanax mexicanus that reduces the sleep needs of the cavefish.

== Ligands ==
=== Agonists ===
- Danavorexton/TAK-925 – selective OX_{2} receptor agonist
- Firazorexton/TAK-994 – selective OX_{2} receptor agonist
- Orexins – dual OX_{1} and OX_{2} receptor agonists
  - Orexin-A – approximately equipotent at the OX_{1} and OX_{2} receptors
  - Orexin-B – approximately 5- to 10-fold selectivity for the OX_{2} receptor over the OX_{1} receptor
- SB-668875 – selective OX_{2} receptor agonist
- Suntinorexton – selective OX_{2} receptor agonist
- Oveporexton/TAK-861 – selective OX_{2} receptor agonist
- Cleminorexton - selective OX_{2} receptor agonist

=== Antagonists ===
- Almorexant - Dual OX_{1} and OX_{2} antagonist
- Daridorexant (nemorexant) - Dual OX_{1} and OX_{2} antagonist
- EMPA - Selective OX_{2} antagonist
- Filorexant - Dual OX_{1} and OX_{2} antagonist
- JNJ-10397049 (600x selective for OX_{2} over OX_{1})
- Lemborexant - Dual OX_{1} and OX_{2} antagonist
- MK-1064 - Selective OX_{2} antagonist
- MK-8133 - Selective OX_{2} antagonist
- SB-649,868 - Dual OX_{1} and OX_{2} antagonist
- Seltorexant - Selective OX_{2} antagonist
- Suvorexant - Dual OX_{1} and OX_{2} antagonist
- TCS-OX2-29 - Selective OX_{2} antagonist
- (3,4-dimethoxyphenoxy)alkylamino acetamides
- Compound 1m - Selective OX_{2} antagonist

== See also ==
- Orexin receptor
