= Oveporexton =

Medication

Clinical data
- Trade names: Orzeyful
- Other names: TAK-861; TAK861
- AHFS/Drugs.com: Orzeyful
- License data: US DailyMed: Oveporexton
- Routes of administration: Oral
- Drug class: Orexin OX_{2} receptor agonist

Legal status
- Legal status: US: Schedule IV; CN: Rx-only

Pharmacokinetic data
- Protein binding: >96%
- Metabolism: CYP3A4
- Onset of action: 1–4 hours (T_{max})
- Elimination half-life: 16–24 hours
- Excretion: Feces: 80.5% Urine: 11.0%

Identifiers
- IUPAC name: N-[(2S,3R)-2-[[3-(3,5-difluorophenyl)-2-fluorophenyl]methyl]-4,4-difluoro-1-(2-hydroxy-2-methylpropanoyl)pyrrolidin-3-yl]ethanesulfonamide
- CAS Number: 2460722-04-5
- PubChem CID: 154617563
- DrugBank: DB21680
- ChemSpider: 130299567
- UNII: 59MF6P2ATF
- KEGG: D13223
- ChEMBL: ChEMBL6068065

Chemical and physical data
- Formula: C_{23}H_{25}F_{5}N_{2}O_{4}S
- Molar mass: 520.52 g·mol^{−1}
- 3D model (JSmol): Interactive image
- SMILES: CCS(=O)(=O)N[C@@H]1[C@@H](N(CC1(F)F)C(=O)C(C)(C)O)CC2=C(C(=CC=C2)C3=CC(=CC(=C3)F)F)F
- InChI: InChI=1S/C23H25F5N2O4S/c1-4-35(33,34)29-20-18(30(12-23(20,27)28)21(31)22(2,3)32)10-13-6-5-7-17(19(13)26)14-8-15(24)11-16(25)9-14/h5-9,11,18,20,29,32H,4,10,12H2,1-3H3/t18-,20+/m0/s1; Key:KVMGAIOTUIGROS-AZUAARDMSA-N

Oveporexton, sold under the brand name Orzeyful, is a medication used for the treatment of narcolepsy type 1. It is taken by mouth.

The most common side effects include insomnia, increased urinary frequency, urgency to urinate, and increased saliva production. Oveporexton is an orexin OX_{2} receptor agonist.

Oveporexton was approved for medical use in China in July 2026, and in the United States in August 2026.

== Medical uses ==
Oveporexton is indicated for the treatment of narcolepsy type 1 (narcolepsy with cataplexy) in adults.

Narcolepsy type 1 is a rare, lifelong neuropsychiatric sleep disorder. It is caused by the loss of brain cells that produce orexin, a chemical messenger that regulates wakefulness, sleep, and muscle tone. Without orexin, the brain struggles to maintain alertness or to control the boundary between sleep and waking. The result is a cluster of disabling symptoms, including excessive daytime sleepiness, cataplexy (sudden muscle weakness triggered by strong emotions such as laughter), sleep paralysis, hallucinations at the edge of sleep or waking, and disrupted nighttime sleep.

The effectiveness and safety of oveporexton were evaluated in two randomized, double-blind, placebo-controlled 12-week studies enrolling 273 adults with narcolepsy type 1. Across both studies, participants taking oveporexton 2 mg showed improvements in their ability to stay awake during the day compared with those receiving placebo. Participants also reported substantially less daytime sleepiness, a significant reduction in cataplexy episodes, and meaningful improvement across the full spectrum of narcolepsy symptoms, including sleep paralysis, hallucinations, and disrupted nighttime sleep.

== Contraindications ==
The only listed absolute contraindication of oveporexton is combination with strong CYP3A4 inhibitors.

== Side effects ==
The most common side effects of oveporexton include insomnia, increased urinary frequency, urgency to urinate, and increased saliva production.

== Overdose ==
There is no specific antidote for oveporexton overdose.

== Interactions ==
Oveporexton is primarily metabolized by the cytochrome P450 enzyme CYP3A4. As such, CYP3A4 inhibitors and inducers can alter oveporexton exposure and hence result in interactions when combined with oveporexton. Strong CYP3A4 inhibitors are contraindicated with oveporexton, while dose reduction is warranted with moderate CYP3A4 inhibitors. Use with moderate to strong CYP3A4 inducers should be avoided. No clinically meaningful interactions are expected with weak CYP3A4 inhibitors and inducers. Examples of moderate to strong CYP3A4 inhibitors include itraconazole and fluconazole. Examples of moderate to strong CYP3A4 inducers include phenytoin. Oveporexton does not appear to inhibit or induce various cytochrome P450 enzymes itself.

== Pharmacology ==
=== Pharmacodynamics ===
Oveporexton acts as a selective agonist of the orexin OX_{2} receptor. Oveporexton has wakefulness-promoting effects in animals, including in rodents and monkeys. In addition, oveporexton has been found to be effective in the treatment of narcolepsy and cataplexy in phase 3 clinical trials in humans. Oveporexton is a first-in-class medication and targets the root symptomatic cause of narcolepsy type 1 by remediating the orexin (hypocretin) deficiency that is present in the condition.

=== Pharmacokinetics ===
The disposition of oveporexton is biexponential and it has an elimination half-life of 16 to 24 hours in humans. The FDA label gives a more specific mean terminal elimination half-life of 23.2 hours.

== History ==
Oveporexton was developed by Takeda. As of July 2025, it has completed phase III clinical trials for treatment of narcolepsy. Oveporexton was approved in China for narcolepsy type 1 in July 2026, its first global approval. Oveporexton was approved in the United States for narcolepsy type 1 in August 2026.

== Society and culture ==
=== Names ===
Oveporexton is the international nonproprietary name and the United States Adopted Name. It is sold under the brand name Orzeyful.

=== Legal status ===
Oveporexton was approved for medical use in China in July 2026, and in the United States in August 2026.

The FDA granted the application for oveporexton breakthrough therapy and priority review designations. The approval of Orzeyful for the treatment of narcolepsy type 1 was granted to Takeda Pharmaceuticals America.

Oveporexton is Schedule IV under the Controlled Substances Act in the United States.
