= Almorexant =

Orexin antagonist compound

Clinical data
- Other names: ACT-078573
- Routes of administration: By mouth
- Drug class: Orexin antagonist
- ATC code: None

Pharmacokinetic data
- Metabolism: Hepatic
- Elimination half-life: 13–19 hours

Identifiers
- IUPAC name: (2R)-2-[(1S)- 6,7-Dimethoxy-1-{2-[4-(trifluoromethyl)phenyl]ethyl}-3,4-dihydroisoquinolin-2(1H)-yl]-N-methyl-2-phenylacetamide
- CAS Number: 871224-64-5 913358-93-7 (HCl)
- PubChem CID: 23727689
- IUPHAR/BPS: 2886
- ChemSpider: 21377865
- UNII: 9KCW39P2EI
- KEGG: D09964
- ChEMBL: ChEMBL455136
- CompTox Dashboard (EPA): DTXSID801007352

Chemical and physical data
- Formula: C_{29}H_{31}F_{3}N_{2}O_{3}
- Molar mass: 512.573 g·mol^{−1}
- 3D model (JSmol): Interactive image
- SMILES: CNC(=O)[C@@H](C1=CC=CC=C1)N2CCC3=CC(=C(C=C3[C@@H]2CCC4=CC=C(C=C4)C(F)(F)F)OC)OC
- InChI: InChI=1S/C29H31F3N2O3/c1-33-28(35)27(20-7-5-4-6-8-20)34-16-15-21-17-25(36-2)26(37-3)18-23(21)24(34)14-11-19-9-12-22(13-10-19)29(30,31)32/h4-10,12-13,17-18,24,27H,11,14-16H2,1-3H3,(H,33,35)/t24-,27+/m0/s1; Key:DKMACHNQISHMDN-RPLLCQBOSA-N

Almorexant (INN), also known by its development code ACT-078573, is an orexin antagonist, acting as a competitive antagonist of the OX_{1} and OX_{2} orexin receptors, which was being developed by the pharmaceutical companies Actelion and GSK for the treatment of insomnia. Development of the drug was abandoned in January 2011 due to concerns over the hepatic safety of almorexant after transient increases in liver enzymes were observed in trials.

== Pharmacology ==
=== Pharmacodynamics ===
Almorexant is a competitive, dual OX_{1} and OX_{2} receptor antagonist and selectively inhibits the functional consequences of OX_{1} and OX_{2} receptor activation, such as intracellular Ca^{2+} mobilization. It dissociates very slowly from the orexin receptors and this may prolong its duration of action.

== History ==
Originally developed by Actelion, from 2007 almorexant was being reported as a potential blockbuster drug, as its novel mechanism of action (orexin receptor antagonism) was thought to produce better quality sleep and fewer side effects than the traditional benzodiazepines and Z-drugs which dominated the multibillion-dollar insomnia medication market.

In 2008, GlaxoSmithKline bought the development and marketing rights for almorexant from Actelion for an initial payment of $147 million. The deal would have been worth an estimated $3.2 billion if the drug had successfully completed clinical development and obtained FDA approval. GSK and Actelion continued to develop the drug together, and completed a Phase III clinical trial in November 2009.

However, in January 2011 Actelion and GSK announced they were abandoning the development of almorexant because of its side effect profile.

In 2014 researchers from Actelion published work indicating that almorexant had mild abuse potential but significantly less abuse potential than zolpidem.
