= Wakefulness-promoting agent =

Drug that increases wakefulness

- Drug class
- The chemical structure of modafinil, a widely used wakefulness-promoting agent

Class identifiers
- Synonyms: Wakefulness-promoting agent; Wakefulness-promoting drug; Wakefulness promoting medication; Wake-promoting agent; Wake-promoting drug; Wake-promoting medication; WPA
- Use: To increase wakefulness and arousal, to reduce sleepiness and sedation

Legal status

A wakefulness-promoting agent (WPA), or wake-promoting agent, is a drug that increases wakefulness and arousal. They are similar to but distinct from psychostimulants, which not only promote wakefulness but also produce other more overt central nervous system effects, such as improved attention span, executive functions, vigilance and motivation. Wakefulness-promoting agents are used to treat narcolepsy and hypersomnia and to increase wakefulness and performance in healthy people.

== Types ==
A variety of different classes of drugs have shown wakefulness-promoting effects, including:

- Dopamine reuptake inhibitors like modafinil, armodafinil, mesocarb, phenylpiracetam, and vanoxerine
- Norepinephrine–dopamine reuptake inhibitors like methylphenidate, solriamfetol, mazindol, bupropion, nomifensine, and amineptine
- Norepinephrine–dopamine releasing agents like amphetamine and methamphetamine
- Norepinephrine reuptake inhibitors like atomoxetine, reboxetine, and desipramine
- Norepinephrine releasing agents like ephedrine and selegiline (via its metabolites)
- Dopamine D_{1} receptor positive allosteric modulators like mevidalen
- Adenosine receptor antagonists like caffeine, paraxanthine, and istradefylline
- Histamine H_{3} receptor antagonists and inverse agonists like pitolisant and samelisant
- Orexin receptor agonists like danavorexton and oveporexton
- Nicotinic acetylcholine receptor agonists like nicotine

=== Other drugs ===
Histamine and other histamine H_{1} receptor agonists also have wakefulness-promoting effects. However, H_{1} receptor agonists as drugs are limited by their mediation of allergy-type symptoms.

Serotonergic psychedelics, acting as serotonin 5-HT_{2A} receptor agonists, such as LSD, psilocybin, mescaline, and DOM, have wakefulness-promoting effects in animals in addition to their hallucinogenic effects. Relatedly, some psychedelics are associated with mild stimulant-like effects in humans and psychedelics have often been associated with insomnia or sleep disturbances. Similarly to serotonergic psychedelics, the iboga alkaloids and oneirogens ibogaine and noribogaine have been found to promote wakefulness in rodents. Relatedly, low doses of Tabernanthe spp. extracts containing ibogaine have been used pharmaceutically as stimulants in the past.

Certain other drugs are being studied as wakefulness-promoting agents as well, including GABA_{A} receptor antagonists and negative allosteric modulators like clarithromycin, flumazenil, and pentylenetetrazol (pentetrazol), among others.

The GHB and GABA_{B} receptor agonist sodium oxybate or γ-hydroxybutyrate (GHB) has been used in the treatment of narcolepsy. Relatedly, some researchers have classified this drug as a stimulant-like agent. However, GHB is taken at night and only results in improved wakefulness the next day following sleep.

== Terminology ==
The related term "eugeroic" (or "eugregoric") means "vigilance-promoting". It was introduced in 1987 in the French literature and has been used as an alternative term to refer to wakefulness-promoting drugs and to distinguish them from psychostimulants. However, the term has usually been used to refer specifically to modafinil and its analogues, even to the exclusion of other wakefulness-promoting agents. Moreover, the term has not been widely adopted in the scientific literature. The discovery of wakefulness-promoting neurons and the orexin neuropeptides has prompted a terminological shift away from the concept of "vigilance-promoting" to "wakefulness-promoting".

== See also ==
- List of investigational narcolepsy and hypersomnia drugs
