= Orexin =

Neuropeptide that regulates arousal, wakefulness, and appetite

HCRT

Identifiers
- Aliases: HCRT, OX, PPOX, hypocretin neuropeptide precursor, NRCLP1
- External IDs: OMIM: 602358; MGI: 1202306; GeneCards: HCRT
Available structures
PDB	Ortholog search: PDBe RCSB
PDB	List of PDB id codes 1CQ0, 1WSO, 1UVQ, 1R02

Gene location (Human)
Chr.	Chromosome 17 (human)
Band	17q21.2	Start	42,184,060 bp
Band	17q21.2	End	42,185,452 bp

Gene location (Mouse)
Chr.	Chromosome 11 (mouse)
Band	11 D|11 63.6 cM	Start	100,651,895 bp
Band	11 D|11 63.6 cM	End	100,653,757 bp
RNA expression pattern
Bgee	Human / Mouse (ortholog); Top expressed in: hypothalamus; pancreatic ductal cell; gonad; granulocyte; nucleus accumbens; putamen; caudate nucleus; muscle tissue; substantia nigra; cerebellum / Top expressed in: dorsomedial hypothalamic nucleus; morula; nucleus of stria terminalis; blastocyst; embryo; lumbar spinal ganglion; embryo; spermatocyte; axial skeleton; meninges; More reference expression data
BioGPS	n/a
Gene ontology
Molecular function	type 2 hypocretin receptor binding; type 1 hypocretin receptor binding; neuropeptide hormone activity
Cellular component	extracellular region; postsynapse; cytoplasm; synapse; cell junction; rough endoplasmic reticulum; endoplasmic reticulum; perinuclear region of cytoplasm; synaptic vesicle; secretory granule; cytoplasmic vesicle
Biological process	excitatory postsynaptic potential; chemical synaptic transmission; neuropeptide signaling pathway; negative regulation of DNA replication; negative regulation of potassium ion transport; feeding behavior; negative regulation of transmission of nerve impulse; positive regulation of transmission of nerve impulse; positive regulation of cytosolic calcium ion concentration; regulation of neurotransmitter secretion; positive regulation of calcium ion transport; phospholipase C-activating G protein-coupled receptor signaling pathway; eating behavior; protein kinase C-activating G protein-coupled receptor signaling pathway; temperature homeostasis; regulation of signaling receptor activity; G protein-coupled receptor signaling pathway; positive regulation of cold-induced thermogenesis; sleep; response to starvation
Sources:Amigo / QuickGO
Orthologs
Databases	NCBI: entry; OMA: entry
Species	Human	Mouse
Entrez	3060	15171
Ensembl	ENSG00000161610	ENSMUSG00000045471
UniProt	O43612	O55241
RefSeq (mRNA)	NM_001524	NM_010410
RefSeq (protein)	NP_001515	NP_034540
Location (UCSC)	Chr 17: 42.18 – 42.19 Mb	Chr 11: 100.65 – 100.65 Mb
PubMed search
- Wikidata
View/Edit Human	View/Edit Mouse

Orexin (/ɒˈrɛksɪn/), also known as hypocretin, is a neuropeptide that regulates arousal, wakefulness, and appetite. It exists in the forms of orexin-A and orexin-B. The most common form of narcolepsy, type 1, in which the individual experiences brief losses of muscle tone ("drop attacks" or cataplexy), is caused by a lack of orexin in the brain due to destruction of the cells that produce it.

There are 50,000–80,000 orexin-producing neurons in the human brain, located predominantly in the perifornical area and lateral hypothalamus. They project widely throughout the central nervous system, regulating wakefulness, feeding, and other behaviours. There are two types of orexin peptide and two types of orexin receptor.

Orexin was discovered in 1998 almost simultaneously by two independent groups of researchers working on the rat brain. One group named it orexin, from orexis, meaning "appetite" in Greek; the other group named it hypocretin, because it is produced in the hypothalamus and bears a weak resemblance to secretin, another peptide. Officially, hypocretin (HCRT) is used to refer to the genes and transcripts, while orexin is used to refer to the encoded peptides. There is considerable similarity between the orexin system in the rat brain and that in the human brain.

== Discovery ==
In 1998, reports of the discovery of orexin/hypocretin were published nearly simultaneously. Luis de Lecea, Thomas Kilduff, and colleagues reported the discovery of the hypocretin system at the same time as Takeshi Sakurai from Masashi Yanagisawa's lab at the University of Texas Southwestern Medical Center at Dallas reported the discovery of the orexins to reflect the orexigenic (appetite-stimulating) activity of these peptides. In their 1998 paper describing these neuropeptides, they also reported discovery of two orexin receptors, dubbed Orexin receptor type 1 (OX_{1}R or OX1) and Orexin receptor type 2 (OX_{2}R or OX2). Masashi Yanagisawa and Emmanuel Mignot were awarded the Breakthrough Prize in 2022 for this discovery.

The two groups also took different approaches towards their discovery. One team was interested in finding new genes that were expressed in the hypothalamus. In 1996, scientists from the Scripps Research Institute reported the discovery of several genes in the rat brain, including one they dubbed "clone 35." Their work showed that clone 35 expression was limited to the lateral hypothalamus. They extracted selective DNA found in the lateral hypothalamus. They cloned this DNA and studied it using electron microscopy. Neurotransmitters found in this area were oddly similar to the gut hormone, secretin, a member of the incretin family, so they named hypocretin to stand for a hypothalamic member of the incretin family. These cells were first thought to reside and work only within the lateral hypothalamus area, but immunocytochemistry techniques revealed the various projections this area truly had to other parts of the brain. A majority of these projections reached the limbic system and structures associated with it (including the amygdala, septum, and basal forebrain area).

On the other hand, Sakurai and colleagues were studying the orexin system as orphan receptors. To this end, they used transgenic cell lines that expressed individual orphan receptors and then exposed them to different potential ligands. They found that the orexin peptides activated the cells expressing the orexin receptors and went on to find orexin peptide expression specifically in the hypothalamus. Additionally, when either orexin peptide was administered to rats it stimulated feeding, giving rise to the name 'orexin'.

The nomenclature of the orexin/hypocretin system now recognizes the history of its discovery. "Hypocretin" refers to the gene or genetic products and "orexin" refers to the protein, reflecting the differing approaches that resulted in its discovery. The use of both terms is also a practical necessity because "HCRT" is the standard gene symbol in databases like GenBank and "OX" is used to refer to the pharmacology of the peptide system by the International Union of Basic and Clinical Pharmacology.

== Isoforms ==
There are two types of orexin: orexin-A and orexin-B (hypocretin-1 and hypocretin-2). They are excitatory neuropeptides with approximately 50% sequence identity, produced by cleavage of a single precursor protein. This precursor protein is known as prepro-orexin (or preprohypocretin) and is a 130 amino acid pre-pro-peptide encoded by the gene HRCT and located on chromosome 17 (17q21). Orexin-A is 33 amino acid residues long and has two intrachain disulfide bonds; orexin-B is a linear 28 amino acid residue peptide. Although these peptides are produced by a very small population of cells in the lateral and posterior hypothalamus, they send projections throughout the brain. The orexin peptides bind to the two G-protein coupled orexin receptors, OX_{1} and OX_{2}, with orexin-A binding to both OX_{1} and OX_{2} with approximately equal affinity while orexin-B binds mainly to OX_{2} and is 5 times less potent at OX_{1}.

The orexins are strongly conserved peptides, found in all major classes of vertebrates.

== Function ==
The orexin system was initially suggested to be primarily involved in the stimulation of food intake, based on the finding that central administration of orexin-A and -B increased food intake. In addition, it stimulates wakefulness, regulates energy expenditure, and modulates visceral function. The orexin system has been hypothesized to function by exciting other neurons that produce neurotransmitters (such as the locus coeruleus), as well as by inhibiting neurons in the ventrolateral preoptic nucleus, which is a region of the brain whose neuronal activity is imperative to proper sleep function.

=== Brown fat activation ===
Many studies support that the orexin neurons regulate brown adipose tissue (BAT) activity via the sympathetic nervous system to enhance energy expenditure. Although orexin knockout mice were reported to show maldevelopment of brown adipose tissue (BAT), subsequent report has shown normal development of BAT.

=== Wakefulness ===
Orexin seems to promote wakefulness. Studies indicate that a major role of the orexin system is to integrate metabolic, circadian and sleep debt influences to determine whether an animal should be asleep, or awake and active. Orexin neurons strongly excite various brain nuclei with important roles in wakefulness including the dopamine, norepinephrine, histamine and acetylcholine systems and appear to play an important role in stabilizing wakefulness and sleep.

The discovery that an orexin receptor mutation causes the sleep disorder canine narcolepsy in Doberman Pinschers subsequently indicated a major role for this system in sleep regulation. Genetic knockout mice lacking the gene for orexin were also reported to exhibit narcolepsy. Transitioning frequently and rapidly between sleep and wakefulness, these mice display many of the symptoms of narcolepsy. Researchers are using this animal model of narcolepsy to study the disease. Narcolepsy results in excessive daytime sleepiness, inability to consolidate wakefulness in the day (and sleep at night), and cataplexy, which is the loss of muscle tone in response to strong, usually positive, emotions. Dogs that lack a functional receptor for orexin have narcolepsy, while animals and people lacking the orexin neuropeptide itself also have narcolepsy. Organisms with narcolepsy were also found to experience REM sleep at any time of day, suggesting an alteration of function of REM sleep which can lead to hypnagogic hallucinations.

Central administration of orexin-A strongly promotes wakefulness, increases body temperature and locomotion, and elicits a strong increase in energy expenditure. Sleep deprivation also increases orexin-A transmission. The orexin system may thus be more important in the regulation of energy expenditure than in the regulation of food intake. In fact, orexin-deficient people with narcolepsy have increased obesity rather than decreased BMI, as would be expected if orexin were primarily an appetite stimulating peptide. Another indication that deficits of orexin cause narcolepsy is that depriving monkeys of sleep for 30–36 hours and then injecting them with the neurochemical alleviates the cognitive deficiencies normally seen with such amount of sleep loss.

In humans, narcolepsy is associated with a specific variant of the human leukocyte antigen (HLA) complex. Furthermore, genome-wide analysis shows that, in addition to the HLA variant, people with narcolepsy also exhibit a specific genetic mutation in the T-cell receptor alpha locus. In conjunction, these genetic anomalies cause the immune system to attack and kill the critical orexin neurons. Hence the absence of orexin-producing neurons in people with narcolepsy may be the result of an autoimmune disorder.

=== Food intake ===
Orexin increases the craving for food, and correlates with the function of the substances that promote its production. Orexin is also shown to increase meal size by suppressing inhibitory postingestive feedback. However, some studies suggest that the stimulatory effects of orexin on feeding may be due to general arousal without necessarily increasing overall food intake.

Review findings suggest that hyperglycemia that occurs in mice due to a habitual high-fat diet leads to a reduction in signalling by orexin receptor-2, and that orexin receptors may be a future therapeutic target. Leptin is a hormone produced by fat cells and acts as a long-term internal measure of energy state. Ghrelin is a short-term factor secreted by the stomach just before an expected meal, and strongly promotes food intake. Orexin-producing cells have been shown to be inhibited by leptin (through the leptin receptor pathway), but are activated by ghrelin and hypoglycemia (glucose inhibits orexin production). Orexin, as of 2007, is claimed to be a very important link between metabolism and sleep regulation. Such a relationship has been long suspected, based on the observation that long-term sleep deprivation in rodents dramatically increases food intake and energy metabolism, i.e., catabolism, with lethal consequences on a long-term basis. Sleep deprivation then leads to a lack of energy. In order to make up for this lack of energy, many people use high-carbohydrate and high-fat foods that ultimately can lead to poor health and weight gain. Other dietary nutrients, amino acids, also can activate orexin neurons, and they can suppress the glucose response of orexin neurons at physiological concentration, causing the energy balance that orexin maintains to be thrown off its normal cycle. To this extent, it has been shown that orexin neurons rely on astrocyte-derived lactate to sustain their activity throughout periods of wakefulness.

=== Addiction ===
Preliminary research shows potential for orexin blockers in the treatment of cocaine, opioid, and alcohol addiction. For example, lab rats given drugs which targeted the orexin system lost interest in alcohol despite being given free access in experiments. Wild type mice that were treated with morphine were found to be at a higher risk of developing addiction when compared to mice that did not produce orexin.

Studies of orexin involvement in nicotine addiction have had mixed results. For example, blocking the orexin-1 receptor with the selective orexin antagonist SB-334,867 reduced nicotine self-administration in rats; this may explain why smokers who sustained damage to the insula, a brain region that regulates cravings and contains orexin-1 receptors, lost the desire to smoke. However, other studies in rats using the dual orexin receptor antagonist TCS 1102 have not found similar effects.

=== Lipid metabolism ===
Orexin-A (OXA) has been demonstrated to have a direct effect on an aspect of lipid metabolism. OXA stimulates glucose uptake in 3T3-L1 adipocytes and that increased energy uptake is stored as lipids (triacylglycerol). OXA thus increases lipogenesis. It also inhibits lipolysis and stimulates the secretion of adiponectin. These effects are thought to be mostly conferred via the PI3K pathway because this pathway inhibitor (LY294002) completely blocks OXA effects in adipocytes. The link between OXA and lipid metabolism is currently being studied.

=== Mood ===
High levels of orexin-A have been associated with happiness in human subjects, while low levels have been associated with sadness. The finding suggests that boosting levels of orexin-A could elevate mood in humans, being thus a possible future treatment for disorders like depression. Orexins have also been hypothesized to aid in the development of resilience to the stress response, as their activity in the ventral pallidum was found to decrease depressive symptoms by activating GABAergic neurons at that site.

It has been observed that orexin, while implicated in addiction and depression, is also involved in the display of anhedonia in ADHD. Proper functioning of orexin has been shown to have a large degree of control over behaviors that are motivated by a need to survive, such as searching for food when an organism is starving. When orexin does not function as intended, it impairs an organism's ability to feel pleasure from strongly motivated actions.

== Orexin neurons ==
=== Neurotransmitters ===
Orexinergic neurons have been shown to be sensitive to inputs from Group III metabotropic glutamate receptors, cannabinoid receptor 1 and CB1–OX1 receptor heterodimers, adenosine A_{1} receptors, muscarinic M_{3} receptors, serotonin 5-HT_{1A} receptors, neuropeptide Y receptors, cholecystokinin A receptors, and catecholamines, as well as to ghrelin, leptin, and glucose. Orexinergic neurons themselves regulate release of acetylcholine, serotonin, and noradrenaline.

Orexinergic neurons can be differentiated into two groups based on connectivity and functionality. Orexinergic neurons in the lateral hypothalamic group are closely associated with reward related functions, such as conditioned place preference. These neurons preferentially innervate the ventral tegmental area and the ventromedial prefrontal cortex. The neurons found in the ventral tegmental area, the ventromedial prefrontal cortex, and the nucleus accumbens shell are strongly implicated in addiction and the sensitization of neurons to stimulating drugs (such as amphetamines). Orexin producing neurons in these areas have been found to be primarily indicated in seeking behavior when externally stimulated by environmental signals such as stress. These neurons are in contrast to the lateral hypothalamic neurons, the perifornical-dorsal group of orexinergic neurons are involved in functions related to arousal and autonomic response. These neurons project inter-hypothalamically, as well as to the brainstem, where the release of orexin modulates various autonomic processes.

== Orexin system dysfunction ==
Orexin/hypocretin system dysfunction might be associated with a variety of disorders and medical conditions.

=== Takotsubo syndrome ===
Orexin/hypocretin system dysfunction has been proposed as a novel pathophysiological model of Takotsubo syndrome (acute failure syndrome).

=== ESSENCE ===
ESSENCE (Early Symptomatic Syndromes Eliciting Neurodevelopmental Clinical Examinations) is an umbrella term covering a wide range of neurodevelopmental disorders and difficulties (ADHD, developmental coordination disorder, autism spectrum disorder) as well as ESSENCE-associated conditions (behavioural phenotype syndromes, some neurological conditions and disorders, and severe early-onset mental disorders). Orexin/hypocretin system dysfunction might be associated with many symptoms in a variety of ESSENCE.

== Clinical uses ==
The orexin/hypocretin system is the target of the insomnia medication suvorexant (Belsomra), which works by blocking both orexin receptors. Suvorexant has undergone three phase III trials and was approved in 2014 by the US Food and Drug Administration (FDA) after being denied approval the year before. The other FDA-approved orexin antagonists are lemborexant (Dayvigo) and daridorexant (Quviviq).

Suvorexant has also been studied in regards to its effect on cocaine seeking behavior, but the results in humans were contradictory to those from earlier animal testing.

In 2022, the European Medicines Agency authorized the use of daridorexant (Quviviq) for sleep initiation and maintenance disorders.

=== Other potential uses ===
Intranasal orexin is able to increase cognition in primates, especially under sleep deprived situations, which may provide an opportunity for the treatment of excessive daytime sleepiness.

A study has reported that transplantation of orexin neurons into the pontine reticular formation in rats is feasible, indicating the development of alternative therapeutic strategies in addition to pharmacological interventions to treat narcolepsy.

Orexins are also thought to have potential implications in learning and aiding in fending off diseases such as dementia and other disorders that impair cognition.

== Evolution ==
Prepro-orexin

Identifiers
- Symbol: Orexin
- Pfam: PF02072
- InterPro: IPR001704
- SCOP2: 1cq0 / SCOPe / SUPFAM
- OPM protein: 1wso
Available protein structures:
- PDB: IPR001704 PF02072 (ECOD; PDBsum)
- AlphaFold: IPR001704; PF02072

The exon architecture of orexin is conserved in all vertebrates.
