= List of investigational insomnia drugs =

Investigational insomnia drugs

This is a list of investigational insomnia drugs, or drugs that are currently under development for clinical use for the treatment of insomnia but are not yet approved. They may also be referred to as investigational hypnotics.

Chemical/generic names are listed first, with developmental code names, synonyms, and brand names in parentheses. The format of list items is "Name (Synonyms) – Mechanism of Action [Reference]".

This list was last comprehensively updated in September 2025. It is likely to become outdated with time.

== Under development ==
=== Preregistration ===
- Tasimelteon (Hetlioz; BMS-214778; VEC-162) – melatonin MT_{1} and MT_{2} receptor agonist

=== Phase 3 ===
- Brexpiprazole (Rexulti; Lu-AF41156; OPC-34712; OPDC-34712) – atypical antipsychotic (non-selective monoamine receptor modulator)
- Cannabidiol soft-gel (CBD soft-gel; CBD-TPM) — cannabinoid and various actions
- Diphenhydramine/lorazepam/zolpidem (SM-1; SM1) – combination of diphenhydramine (antihistamine and anticholinergic), lorazepam (benzodiazepine and GABA_{A} receptor positive allosteric modulator), and zolpidem (nonbenzodiazepine/Z-drug and GABA_{A} receptor positive allosteric modulator)
- Zuranolone (BIIB-125; S-812217; SAGE-217; SGE-797; Zurzuvae) – GABA_{A} receptor positive allosteric modulator and neurosteroid

=== Phase 2 ===
- Dexmedetomidine buccal (RE-03) — α_{2}-adrenergic receptor agonist
- Lumateperone (Caplyta; ITI-007; ITI-722) – atypical antipsychotic (non-selective monoamine receptor modulator)
- Pimavanserin (Nuplazid; ACP-103; BVF-048) – serotonin 5-HT_{2A} receptor antagonist
- Piromelatine (Neu-P11) – melatonin MT_{1} and MT_{2} receptor agonist, serotonin 5-HT_{1A} and 5-HT_{1D} receptor agonist, and serotonin 5-HT_{2B} receptor antagonist
- Seltorexant (JNJ-42847922; JNJ-7922; MIN-202) – orexin OX_{2} receptor antagonist
- Sunobinop (IMB-115; IT-1315; RSC117957; S-117957; V-117957) – nociceptin receptor agonist
- Trazodone extended-release (AF-1161; DDS-04A; Oleptro; Triticum AC; Trittico) – serotonin 5-HT_{1A} receptor partial agonist, serotonin 5-HT_{2A} and 5-HT_{2C} receptor antagonist, α_{1}- and α_{2}-adrenergic receptor antagonist, weak serotonin reuptake inhibitor, and other actions

=== Phase 1/2 ===
- SVT-4A1011 – microbiome modulator and live microbial therapeutic

=== Phase 1 ===
- Ramelteon controlled-release – melatonin MT_{1} and MT_{2} receptor agonist

=== Preclinical ===
- APSTZD (APS-TZD) – undefined mechanism of action
- HS-10506 – orexin OX_{2} receptor antagonist
- TPT-0601 – fatty acid amide hydrolase (FAAH) inhibitor
- YZG-331 – adenosine receptor agonist

=== Research ===
- Trazodone (TrazoFlex-24; TrazoFlex-CR; TrazoFlex) – serotonin 5-HT_{1A} receptor partial agonist, serotonin 5-HT_{2A} and 5-HT_{2C} receptor antagonist, α_{1}- and α_{2}-adrenergic receptor antagonist, weak serotonin reuptake inhibitor, and other actions

=== Phase unknown ===
- Midazolam sublingual film – GABA_{A} receptor positive allosteric modulator and benzodiazepine
- OP-010 (OP010) – undefined mechanism of action
- Zolpidem extended-release – GABA_{A} receptor positive allosteric modulator and nonbenzodiazepine/Z-drug

== Not under development ==
=== Suspended ===
- Osemozotan (MKC-242; MN-305) – serotonin 5-HT_{1A} receptor agonist

=== No development reported ===
- Filorexant (MK-6096) – orexin OX_{1} and OX_{2} receptor antagonist
- HEC-83518 – orexin receptor antagonist
- IN-AQUL-001 – undefined mechanism of action
- JNJ-48816274 – orexin OX_{2} receptor antagonist
- Lirequinil (RO-413696) – GABA_{A} receptor positive allosteric modulator and nonbenzodiazepine/benzoquinolizinone
- Lorediplon (GF-015535-00) – GABA_{A} receptor positive allosteric modulator and nonbenzodiazepine/pyrazolopyrimidine
- MK-1064 – orexin OX_{2} receptor antagonist
- Research programme: psychophysiological insomnia therapeutics - Neurim Pharmaceuticals – melatonin and serotonin receptor agonists
- Zolpidem topical gel (TR-396) – GABA_{A} receptor positive allosteric modulator and nonbenzodiazepine/Z-drug

=== Discontinued ===
- ACT-462206 – orexin OX_{1} and OX_{2} receptor antagonist
- Adipiplon (NG-273) – GABA_{A} receptor positive allosteric modulator
- ADX-10061 (NNC 01-0687; CEE-03-310; NNC-687) – dopamine D_{1} receptor antagonist
- Almorexant (ACT-078573) – orexin OX_{1} and OX_{2} receptor antagonist
- ANPH-101 – undefined mechanism of action
- Atagabalin (PD-0200390) – gabapentinoid (α_{2}δ voltage-gated calcium channel ligand)
- Eplivanserin (Ciltyri; Sliwens; SR–46349; SR–46349B; SR–46615A) – serotonin 5-HT_{2A} receptor antagonist
- Esmirtazapine (ORG-50081; SCH-900265; (S)-mirtazapine) – histamine H_{1} receptor antagonist, serotonin 5-HT_{2} receptor antagonist, and α_{2}-adrenergic receptor antagonist
- Gaboxadol (LU-02030; LU-2-030; MK-0928; OV-101; THIP) – GABA_{A} receptor agonist
- GT-2203 – histamine H_{3} receptor agonist
- Indiplon (NBI-34060) – GABA_{A} receptor positive allosteric modulator and nonbenzodiazepine/pyrazolopyrimidine
- LY-2624803 (HY-10275) – histamine H_{1} receptor inverse agonist and serotonin 5-HT_{2A} receptor antagonist
- Nabilone (Cesamet) – cannabinoid CB_{1} and CB_{2} receptor agonist
- NBI-75043 – antihistamine (histamine H_{1} receptor antagonist)
- Nelotanserin (APD-125; RVT-102) – serotonin 5-HT_{2A} receptor antagonist
- NGD-962 (NGD 96-2) – GABA_{A} receptor modulator
- Paliperidone (Invega; JNS-007ER; RO-76477; 9-hydroxyrisperidone) – atypical antipsychotic (non-selective monoamine receptor modulator)
- PD-0299685 (PF-299685) – gabapentinoid (α_{2}δ voltage-gated calcium channel ligand)
- Pruvanserin (EMD-281014; LY-2422347; LSN-2411347) – serotonin 5-HT_{2A} receptor antagonist
- Remimazolam (HR-7056; Byfavo) – GABA_{A} receptor positive allosteric modulator and benzodiazepine
- Seganserin (R-56413) – serotonin 5-HT_{2A} and 5-HT_{2C} receptor antagonist
- Suvecaltamide (CX-8998; JZP-385; MK-8998) – T-type calcium channel inhibitor
- Tasipimidine (ODM-105) – α_{2A}-adrenergic receptor agonist
- Tesamorelin (Egrifta; MDVTM; TH-9507; ThGRF 1-44) – growth hormone-releasing hormone (GHRH) receptor agonist
- Tiagabine (A-70569; CEP-6671; Gabitril; NO-050328; NO-328) – GABA transporter 1 (GAT-1) blocker and GABA reuptake inhibitor
- Triazolam intranasal (Hypnostat; TGAR01H) – GABA_{A} receptor positive allosteric modulator and benzodiazepine
- Volinanserin (M-100907; MDL-100907) – serotonin 5-HT_{2A} receptor antagonist

=== Formal development never or not yet started ===
- Histone deacetylase inhibitors (HDACi) (e.g., butyric acid (butyrate), tributyrin)

== Clinically used drugs ==
=== Approved drugs ===
==== GABA_{A} receptor positive allosteric modulators ====
Benzodiazepines

- Dimdazenil (Junoenil; EVT-201) – GABA_{A} receptor partial positive allosteric modulator and benzodiazepine
- Quazepam (Doral; SCH-16134) – GABA_{A} receptor positive allosteric modulator and benzodiazepine
- Other benzodiazepines (GABA_{A} receptor positive allosteric modulators) (e.g., estazolam, flurazepam, temazepam, triazolam, others)

Nonbenzodiazepines/Z-drugs

- Eszopiclone (Esopiclone; Estorra; Lunesta; Lunivia; S-Zopiclone; SEP-0227018; SEP-190; SEP-225441) – GABA_{A} receptor positive allosteric modulator and nonbenzodiazepine/Z-drug
- Zaleplon (Sonata; Zerene; CL–284846; L–846; LJC–10846) – GABA_{A} receptor positive allosteric modulator and nonbenzodiazepine/Z-drug
- Zolpidem extended-release (Ambien CR; FK-199B; Stilnox; Zolpidem XR) – GABA_{A} receptor positive allosteric modulator and nonbenzodiazepine/Z-drug
- Zolpidem oral spray (Zolpimist) – GABA_{A} receptor positive allosteric modulator and nonbenzodiazepine/Z-drug
- Zolpidem sublingual (Edluar; Sublinox; OX-22) – GABA_{A} receptor positive allosteric modulator and nonbenzodiazepine/Z-drug

==== Orexin receptor antagonists ====
- Daridorexant (Quviviq; ACT-541468; nemorexant) – orexin OX_{1} and OX_{2} receptor antagonist
- Fazamorexant (Mengping; HY-901139; YZJ-1139) – orexin OX_{1} and OX_{2} receptor antagonist
- Lemborexant (Dayvigo; E-2006) – orexin OX_{1} and OX_{2} receptor antagonist
- Suvorexant (Belsomra; MK-4305) – orexin OX_{1} and OX_{2} receptor antagonist
- Vornorexant (Vorzzz; ORN-0829; TS-142) – orexin OX_{1} and OX_{2} receptor antagonist

==== Melatonin receptor agonists ====
- Melatonin controlled-release (Circadin; Orlogin; PedPRM; Slenyto; KI-1001) – melatonin MT_{1} and MT_{2} receptor agonist
- Ramelteon (Rozerem; TAK-375) – melatonin MT_{1} and MT_{2} receptor agonist

==== Other drugs ====
- Doxepin low dose (Silenor; SO-101) – antihistamine (histamine H_{1} receptor antagonist)
- Niaprazine (Nopron) – serotonin 5-HT_{2A} receptor antagonist and α_{1}-adrenergic receptor antagonist
- Phenibut (Anvifen) – GABA_{B} receptor agonist and gabapentinoid (α_{2}δ voltage-gated calcium channel ligand)
- Tetrahydrocannabinol/cannabinol/cannabidiol (THC/CBN/CBD; Zenivol; ZTL-101) – combination of tetrahydrocannabinol (THC) (cannabinoid), cannabinol (CBN) (cannabinoid), and cannabidiol (CBD) (cannabinoid)

=== Withdrawn drugs ===
==== GABA_{A} receptor positive allosteric modulators ====
- Zolpidem sublingual (Intermezzo) – GABA_{A} receptor positive allosteric modulator and nonbenzodiazepine/Z-drug

=== Discontinued drugs ===
==== GABA_{A} receptor positive allosteric modulators ====
- Barbiturates (e.g., amobarbital, pentobarbital, phenobarbital, secobarbital) – GABA_{A} receptor positive allosteric modulators
- Piperidinediones (e.g., glutethimide) – GABA_{A} receptor positive allosteric modulators
- Quinazolinones (e.g., methaqualone) – GABA_{A} receptor positive allosteric modulators

==== Other drugs ====
- Fenadiazole (phénadiazole; Hypnazol, Eudormil, Viodor) – unknown mechanism of action

=== Off-label drugs ===
- α_{1}-Adrenergic receptor antagonists (e.g., prazosin)
- α_{2}-Adrenergic receptor agonists (e.g., clonidine, tizanidine)
- Agomelatine (Valdoxan, Thymanax) – melatonin MT_{1} and MT_{2} receptor agonist and weak serotonin 5-HT_{2C} receptor antagonist
- Amanita muscaria or muscimol – GABA_{A} receptor agonist
- Antihistamines (histamine H_{1} receptor antagonists) (e.g., diphenhydramine, doxylamine, hydroxyzine, cyproheptadine, promethazine)
- Atypical antipsychotics (e.g., quetiapine, olanzapine, risperidone)
- Cannabinoids (cannabinoid receptor modulators) (e.g., cannabis, dronabinol/tetrahydrocannabinol (THC), cannabidiol (CBD))
- Gabapentinoids (α_{2}δ voltage-gated calcium channel ligands) (e.g., gabapentin, pregabalin, gabapentin enacarbil)
- Herbal supplements (e.g., chamomile, kava, lavender, passion flower, theanine, valerian)
- Melatonin (over-the-counter) – melatonin MT_{1} and MT_{2} receptor agonist
- Neurosteroids (GABA_{A} receptor positive allosteric modulators) (e.g., oral progesterone)
- Serotonin precursors (indirect serotonin receptor agonists) (e.g., tryptophan, 5-HTP)
- Tetracyclic antidepressants (TeCAs) (e.g., mirtazapine)
- Trazodone (Desyrel) – serotonin 5-HT_{1A} receptor partial agonist, serotonin 5-HT_{2A} and 5-HT_{2C} receptor antagonist, α_{1}- and α_{2}-adrenergic receptor antagonist, weak serotonin reuptake inhibitor, and other actions
- Tricyclic antidepressants (TCAs) (e.g., amitriptyline, high-dose doxepin, trimipramine)

== See also ==
- List of investigational drugs
- List of investigational narcolepsy and hypersomnia drugs
- List of investigational chronobiotics
- Hypnotic
