= Orexin antagonist =

Class of drugs

Orexin receptor antagonist
- Drug class

Class identifiers
- Use: Insomnia
- ATC code: N05C
- Biological target: Orexin receptors

External links
- MeSH: D000068796

Legal status

In medicine and pharmacology, an orexin receptor antagonist or orexin antagonist is a drug that inhibits the effect of orexin by acting as a receptor antagonist of one (selective orexin receptor antagonist, SORA) or both (dual orexin receptor antagonist, DORA) of the orexin receptors, OX_{1} and OX_{2}. Medical applications include treatment of sleep disorders such as insomnia.

== Examples ==
=== Marketed ===
- Daridorexant (nemorexant; Quviviq) – dual OX_{1} and OX_{2} antagonist – approved for insomnia in January 2022, formerly under development for sleep apnea – half-life 8 hours
- Fazamorexant (Mengping) – dual OX_{1} and OX_{2} antagonist – approved for insomnia in China in May 2026 – half-life 2–4 hours
- Lemborexant (Dayvigo) – dual OX_{1} and OX_{2} antagonist – approved for insomnia in December 2019 and released June 1 2020, under development for circadian rhythm sleep disorders, chronic obstructive pulmonary disease, and sleep apnea – half-life 17–55 hours
- Suvorexant (Belsomra) – dual OX_{1} and OX_{2} antagonist – approved for insomnia in August 2014, under development for delirium – half-life 12 hours
- Vornorexant (Vorzzz) – dual OX_{1} and OX_{2} antagonist – approved for insomnia in Japan in August 2025 – half-life 1.5–3 hours

=== Under development ===
- Nivasorexant (ACT-539313) – selective OX_{1} antagonist – under development for binge eating disorder and previously for anxiety disorders, up to phase 2 – half-life 3–7 hours
- Seltorexant (MIN-202, JNJ-42847922, JNJ-922) – selective OX_{2} antagonist – under development for major depressive disorder, insomnia, and sleep apnea, up to phase 3 – half-life 2–3 hours
- Tebideutorexant (JNJ-61393215, JNJ-3215) – selective OX_{1} antagonist – under development for major depressive disorder, no development reported for anxiety disorders and panic disorder, up to phase 2 – half-life 14–25 hours

=== Not marketed ===
- ACT-335827 – selective OX_{1} antagonist
- Almorexant (ACT-078573) – dual OX_{1} and OX_{2} antagonist – half-life 13–19 hours – development of the drug was abandoned in January 2011
- EMPA – selective OX_{2} antagonist
- Filorexant (MK-6096) – dual OX_{1} and OX_{2} antagonist – half-life 3–6 hours – development was discontinued in 2015
- GSK-649868 (SB-649868) – dual OX_{1} and OX_{2} antagonist – was in development for potential use in sleep disorders
- JNJ-10397049 – selective OX_{2} antagonist
- RTIOX-276 – selective OX_{1} antagonist
- SB-334867 – first non-peptide selective OX_{1} antagonist – has been shown to produce sedative and anorectic effects in animals
- SB-408124 – selective OX_{1} antagonist
- TCS-OX2-29 – first non-peptide selective OX_{2} antagonist

== Medical uses ==
=== Insomnia ===
Orexin receptor antagonists dose-dependently improve sleep parameters including latency to persistent sleep (LPS), wake after sleep onset (WASO), sleep efficiency (SE), total sleep time (TST), and sleep quality (SQ).

Orexin receptor antagonists are not currently used as first-line treatments for insomnia due to cost and concerns about possible misuse liability.

=== Delirium ===
Suvorexant appears to be effective in the prevention of delirium.

== Side effects ==
Side effects of orexin receptor antagonists include somnolence, daytime sleepiness and sedation, headache, abnormal dreams, fatigue, and dry mouth.

Rates of somnolence or fatigue with orexin receptor antagonists in clinical trials were 7% (vs. 3% with placebo) for suvorexant 15 to 20 mg, 7 to 10% (vs. 1.3% for placebo) for lemborexant 5 to 10 mg, and 5 to 6% (vs. 4% with placebo) for daridorexant 25 to 50 mg.

== Contraindications ==
Narcolepsy, a neurological disorder caused by orexin deficiency, is a contraindication to the use of orexin antagonists.

== Pharmacology ==
=== Pharmacokinetics ===
The elimination half-lives of clinically used orexin receptor antagonists are 12 hours for suvorexant, about 17 to 19 hours ("effective" half-life) or 55 hours (terminal elimination half-life) for lemborexant, and 6 to 10 hours for daridorexant. The elimination half-lives of investigational orexin receptor antagonists are 2 to 3 hours for seltorexant and about 1.5 to 3 hours for vornorexant.

The pharmacokinetics of suvorexant are significantly affected by age, sex, and other factors, leading to increased blood concentrations in female, obese, and older patients. These factors do not significantly affect the pharmacokinetics of lemborexant or daridorexant.

All three marketed orexin antagonists do not need to be dose adjusted in patients with reduced renal function, as the pharmacokinetic profiles of these medications are not significantly affected. In patients with moderate to severe hepatic impairment, dose adjustments of these medications may be necessary.

== Research ==
Filorexant was studied for but was not found to be effective in the treatment of diabetic neuropathy, migraine, and major depressive disorder in phase 2 clinical trials. Seltorexant is under development for treatment of major depressive disorder however and is in phase 3 trials for this indication. Also, suvorexant is in a phase 4 trial for use as an adjunct to antidepressant therapy in people with major depressive disorder and residual insomnia.
