= Fazamorexant =

Orexin receptor antagonist

Clinical data
- Trade names: Mengping
- Other names: HY-901139; HY901139; YZJ-1139; YZJ1139
- Routes of administration: Oral
- Drug class: Orexin receptor antagonist

Legal status
- Legal status: Rx in China, investigational in general

Pharmacokinetic data
- Elimination half-life: 1.9–3.7 hours

Identifiers
- IUPAC name: [(1S,2R,5S)-2-[(5-fluoropyridin-2-yl)oxymethyl]-8-azabicyclo[3.2.1]octan-8-yl]-(5-methyl-2-pyrimidin-2-ylphenyl)methanone
- CAS Number: 1808918-69-5
- PubChem CID: 156889652
- ChemSpider: 128922072
- UNII: MDH4D7M594
- ChEMBL: ChEMBL5314459

Chemical and physical data
- Formula: C_{25}H_{25}FN_{4}O_{2}
- Molar mass: 432.499 g·mol^{−1}
- 3D model (JSmol): Interactive image
- SMILES: CC1=CC(=C(C=C1)C2=NC=CC=N2)C(=O)N3[C@H]4CC[C@H]([C@@H]3CC4)COC5=NC=C(C=C5)F
- InChI: InChI=1S/C25H25FN4O2/c1-16-3-8-20(24-27-11-2-12-28-24)21(13-16)25(31)30-19-6-4-17(22(30)9-7-19)15-32-23-10-5-18(26)14-29-23/h2-3,5,8,10-14,17,19,22H,4,6-7,9,15H2,1H3/t17-,19-,22-/m0/s1; Key:PMJPLAGTPPVSRL-JLMWRMLUSA-N

Fazamorexant (INN), sold under the brand name Mengping, is an orexin receptor antagonist which is used in the treatment of insomnia in China. It is taken orally.

The drug acts as a dual orexin receptor antagonist (DORA), or as an antagonist of both the orexin OX_{1} and OX_{2} receptors. Its time to peak levels is 0.6 to 1.3 hours and its elimination half-life is 1.9 to 3.7 hours.

Fazamorexant was developed by Jiangsu Yangtze River Pharmaceutical Group and/or Shanghai Haiyan Pharmaceutical Technology in China. Relatively little public information is available on fazamorexant. This was such that it had to be excluded from a 2020 literature review of orexin receptor antagonists for insomnia. The drug was approved in China in May 2026.

== See also ==
- Orexin receptor antagonist
- List of investigational insomnia drugs
- Vornorexant and seltorexant (other short-acting orexin antagonists)
