= Seltorexant =

Experimental anti-insomnia drug

Clinical data
- Other names: MIN-202; MIN202; JNJ-42847922; JNJ42847922; JNJ-922; JNJ922
- Routes of administration: Oral
- Drug class: Orexin receptor antagonist; Hypnotic
- ATC code: None

Legal status
- Legal status: US: Investigational New Drug

Pharmacokinetic data
- Metabolism: CYP3A4
- Onset of action: 0.3–1.5 hours (T_{max})
- Elimination half-life: 2–3 hours

Identifiers
- IUPAC name: [5-(4,6-dimethylpyrimidin-2-yl)-hexahydropyrrolo[3,4-c]pyrrol-2-yl]-(2-fluoro-6-[1,2,3]triazol-2-ylphenyl)methanone
- CAS Number: 1293281-49-8
- PubChem CID: 67116280
- ChemSpider: 34989176
- UNII: AIS8N3O50B
- KEGG: D11269

Chemical and physical data
- Formula: C_{21}H_{22}FN_{7}O
- Molar mass: 407.453 g·mol^{−1}
- 3D model (JSmol): Interactive image
- SMILES: c4c(C)nc(nc4C)N5CC2CN(CC2C5)C(=O)c1c(cccc1F)-n3nccn3
- InChI: InChI=1S/C21H22FN7O/c1-13-8-14(2)26-21(25-13)28-11-15-9-27(10-16(15)12-28)20(30)19-17(22)4-3-5-18(19)29-23-6-7-24-29/h3-8,15-16H,9-12H2,1-2H3/t15-,16+; Key:SQOCEMCKYDVLMM-IYBDPMFKSA-N

Seltorexant, also known by its developmental code names MIN-202 and JNJ-42847922, is an orexin antagonist medication which is under development for the treatment of depression, insomnia, and Alzheimer's disease. It is a selective antagonist of the orexin OX_{2} receptor (2‑SORA). The medication is taken orally.

== Side effects ==
Seltorexant is reported to be safe and well-tolerated. Side effects of seltorexant observed in clinical trials so far have included somnolence, fatigue, dizziness, headache, abdominal discomfort, and nightmares.

== Pharmacology ==
=== Pharmacodynamics ===
Seltorexant shows over 100-fold greater binding affinity for the OX_{2} receptor over the OX_{1} receptor. This is in contrast to other orexin receptor antagonists like suvorexant, lemborexant, and daridorexant, which are all dual orexin receptor antagonists (DORAs).

=== Pharmacokinetics ===
Seltorexant has fast absorption with a time to peak levels of 0.3 to 1.5 hours and has a relatively short duration with an elimination half-life of only 2 to 3 hours. No residual effects of the medication were observed 4 hours after daytime administration. The pharmacokinetics of seltorexant are considered to be ideal for sleep induction. Seltorexant is metabolized by the cytochrome P450 enzyme CYP3A4.

== Chemistry ==
Seltorexant is a small-molecule compound and is structurally related to other clinically used orexin receptor antagonists.

== Research ==
As of October 2025, seltorexant is in phase 3 clinical trials for treatment of major depressive disorder (MDD) and phase 2 trials for treatment of insomnia and Alzheimer's disease. It was also under investigation for the treatment of sleep apnea, but no recent development has been reported for this indication. Seltorexant is under development by Minerva Neurosciences and Johnson & Johnson's Janssen Pharmaceuticals.

Seltorexant is being explored at doses of 5 to 80 mg. In the early clinical trials conducted so far, seltorexant has been found to improve depression scores on the Hamilton Depression Rating Scale in people with MDD and to improve sleep onset, total sleep time, time awake after sleep onset, and sleep efficiency in people with MDD and/or insomnia.

== See also ==
- Orexin receptor antagonist
- List of investigational antidepressants
- List of investigational insomnia drugs
- Vornorexant and fazamorexant (other short-acting orexin antagonists)
