= C19H22N2S =

The molecular formula C_{19}H_{22}N_{2}S (molar mass: 310.46 g/mol) may refer to:

- Perathiepin
- Pecazine
- NBI-75043
