= CVN45502 =

Chemical compound

Legal status
- Legal status: Investigational

Identifiers
- IUPAC name: N-[(1S,2S)-2-Methyl-2-[[5-(trifluoromethyl)pyrazin-2-yl]amino]cyclopentyl]-3-(triazol-2-yl)pyridine-2-carboxamide
- CAS Number: 1803556-98-0
- PubChem CID: 118308152
- ChemSpider: 76767388
- ChEMBL: ChEMBL3932722

Chemical and physical data
- Formula: C_{19}H_{19}F_{3}N_{8}O
- Molar mass: 432.411 g·mol^{−1}
- 3D model (JSmol): Interactive image
- SMILES: C[C@@]1(CCC[C@@H]1NC(=O)C2=C(C=CC=N2)N3N=CC=N3)NC4=NC=C(N=C4)C(F)(F)F
- InChI: InChI=1S/C19H19F3N8O/c1-18(29-15-11-24-14(10-25-15)19(20,21)22)6-2-5-13(18)28-17(31)16-12(4-3-7-23-16)30-26-8-9-27-30/h3-4,7-11,13H,2,5-6H2,1H3,(H,25,29)(H,28,31)/t13-,18-/m0/s1; Key:UNZFNWZMBMDMAR-UGSOOPFHSA-N

CVN45502 is a selective hypocretin (orexin) receptor 1 antagonist. It significantly reduces food intake and body weight in a mouse model of obesity. Although HCRTR1 variants are significantly correlated with body weight in humans, it is not known if the drug has psychiatric side effects or could be combined with GLP-1 agonists.
