= SM1 =

SM1 may refer to:

- SM-1, a nuclear reactor
- SM1, a postcode district within the SM postcode area, in Sutton, Greater London
- Signalman First Class, a former rating in the U.S. Navy
- A surface-to-air missile, RIM-66 Standard (SM-1MR) or RIM-67 Standard (SM-1ER)
- VR Class Sm1, a type of train operated by the VR Group
- Spider-Man, the first film in the Spider-Man film series
- Scary Movie, the first film in the Scary Movie series
- Superman, the first Superman film
- SM1, Secondary Math 1
- SM1, an entry index for individual medley events in disability swimming, see S1 (classification)
- SM-1, developmental code name for diphenhydramine/lorazepam/zolpidem, a combination sleep drug
