= Anne-Marie Chang =

Chronobiologist

- Education: Loyola University Chicago (1992) Northwestern University (Ph.D., 2003)
- Scientific career
- Fields: Chronobiology, Neuroscience of sleep
- Workplaces: Pennsylvania State University

Anne-Marie Chang is a researcher in the fields of sleep and circadian rhythms and is currently an associate professor of Bio-behavioral Health at Pennsylvania State University. She earned her Ph.D. in neuroscience from Northwestern University in 2003.

Her research focuses on the effects of sleep physiology and behavior, circadian rhythms, cardio-metabolic health, cognitive function and genomics. Chang's research emphasizes understanding health differences in response to sleep interruptions, such as loss of sleep. Through her research, Chang seeks to elucidate the genetic regulation, rhythm physiology, and rhythm behavior that underlies sleep and circadian rhythms in humans and mice. Her research has since expanded to include the interactions between sleep, circadian rhythms, and cardio-metabolic functions.

== Research ==
Chang's early research focused on identifying genes that regulate circadian rhythms in mammals and their effects on sleep behavior. These studies pioneered experimental methods necessary for locating and mutating the murine Clock gene, which is now recognized as a central contributor to the mammalian circadian clock. Further experiments revealed that mutating the Clock gene in mice reduced period gene expression and improved entrainment efficacy.

=== Sleep health ===
Chang has made many research contributions related to sleep health, particularly relating to how adolescent health is related to sleep characteristics. Much of this work focuses on how sleep deprivation affects cognition and physiological outcomes. One such study found that sleep duration and quality are interrelated with screen time and depressive symptoms in adolescents. The research team suggests that practices like limiting screen time before bedtime, reducing exposure to blue light, and establishing regular sleep routines are critical for adolescents' sleep health. Another intervention that Chang and her team recommend to improve adolescent health is establishing a family routine to create a sleep-promoting environment and emphasize healthy sleep habits. Her team has also found that shorter sleep duration and greater social jetlag are both associated with more anxious and depressive symptoms in adolescents. These studies have highlighted the importance of adequate sleep duration and regular sleep schedules in promoting mental health by reducing adolescent anxiety as Chang found that short sleep duration and anxiety symptoms have a reciprocal relationship.

Other studies that Chang and her team have conducted have focused on delayed sleep phase syndrome (DSPS) and sleep timing. They have found that people with DSPS have a later sleep timing than their endogenous circadian rhythm and that bright light therapy and melatonin can help shift their circadian rhythms earlier, improving sleep health. Chang also determined that DSPS patients' symptoms could not be correlated to the phase relationship between sleep-wake patterns and circadian rhythms. Chang also investigated the effects of light exposures on phase delays in the circadian rhythm of melatonin in humans. She found that there is strong evidence for a non-linear resetting response of the pacemaker to light duration. This was further emphasized in her investigation in the use of light-emitting e-readers in the evening and its affects on sleep, circadian timing, and next-morning alertness. Chang found that evening exposure to eBooks cause phase delays in the circadian clock and suppresses melatonin, affecting sleep and health.

Chang's work has also highlighted the impact that sleep deprivation has on college athletes. Collegiate athletes with sleep deprivation experienced decreased reaction time, impaired decision-making, reduced endurance and strength, increased risk of injury, and impaired cognitive function, suggesting that sleep may be an important factor to consider in training and performance of collegiate athletes.

Additionally, Chang has investigated how discrimination in the workplace relates to sleep quality - one example being that women who experienced discrimination in the workplace had poor sleep health. Chang and her team also investigate how sex differences affect sleep health. They have found that the intrinsic circadian period in women is longer than in men. This finding is related to Chang's discovery that under identical sleep conditions, the melatonin and body temperature circadian rhythms in women occur earlier than in men by an average of one hour.

=== Human genetics of sleep ===
Much of Chang's recent work explored how human sleep behaviors were affected by mutations in circadian genes. For example, mutations to the Per2 gene were associated with later chronotypes and varied levels of slow-wave sleep and REM sleep. She discovered several circadian gene mutants that correlate with varied outcomes for sleep deprivation-related ailments and classified other genes as having little to no effect on sleep health.

=== Implications of sleep on cardiovascular and metabolic health ===
Chang has expanded her research in sleep science to include the implications of sleeping behaviors on cardiovascular and metabolic health. Her research also presented sleep's effect on metabolic health. For example, she studied the association between sleep and lipemic response, and she suggested the presence of association between sleep duration and hydration, and between sleep and BMI in adolescents. She also found that sleep restriction effects visually and memory-guided force production magnitude and variability. Moreover, she also concluded from her research that sleep health is associated with breakfast consumption, and thus poor sleep and bad dietary behaviors negatively impacts future metabolic health. Chang's research supports the idea that inadequate sleep is positively associated with increases risk of metabolic disease

=== Extending sleep to improve well-being ===
Much of Chang's research reflects the correlation between sleep and circadian rhythm to social/individual well-being. Her investigations realized the differences of sleep durations among different age groups, Ethnoracial groups, and between sexes, these researches presents socio-environmental significance, and will lead to further studies.

She also researched the effects of secondhand smoke exposure on children and their sleep duration. She found that secondhand smoke exposure negatively impacts and has long-term consequences for childhood sleep durations.

== Notable publications ==
- Ronald M. Evans and Ying-Hui Chen, "Mutagenesis and Mapping of a Mouse Gene, Clock, Essential for Circadian Behavior," Science 264, no. 5159 (1994): 719-25.
- Anne-Marie Chang, Daniel A. Eschbach, Jeanne F. Duffy, and Charles A. Czeisler, "Evening use of light-emitting e-Readers negatively affects sleep, circadian timing, and next-morning alertness," Proceedings of the National Academy of Sciences of the United States of America 112, no. 4 (2015): 1232-37.
- Christopher A. Bradfield and Steven M. Reppert, "Functional identification of the mouse circadian Clock gene by transgenic BAC rescue," Cell 89, no. 4 (1997): 655-67.
- Jeanne F. Duffy, Charles A. Czeisler, and Frank A. J. L. Scheer, "Sex difference in the near-24-hour intrinsic period of the human circadian timing system," Proceedings of the National Academy of Sciences of the United States of America 108, no. Supplement_3 (2011): 15602-08.
- Monique K. LeBourgeois, et al., "Digital media and sleep in childhood and adolescence," Pediatrics 140, no. Supplement_2 (2017): S92-S96.
- Mariana G. Figueiro, et al., "Human responses to bright light of different durations," Journal of Biological Rhythms 27, no. 2 (2012): 70-78.
- Jodi A. Mindell, et al., "Sleep in the modern family: protective family routines for child and adolescent sleep," Sleep Health: Journal of the National Sleep Foundation 1, no. 1 (2015): 15-27.
- Abagayle A. Stock, Soomi Lee, Nicole G. Nahmod, Anne-Marie Chang, "Effects of sleep extension on sleep duration, sleepiness, and blood pressure in college students", Sleep Health: Journal of the National Sleep Foundation 6, no. 1 (2020): 32-39.
- Krishnan, A. S., Reichenberger, D. A., Strayer, S. M., Master, L., Russell, M. A., Buxton, O. M., Hale, L., & Chang, A. M. (2024). Childhood sleep is prospectively associated with adolescent alcohol and marijuana use. Annals of epidemiology, 98, 25–31. https://doi.org/10.1016/j.annepidem.2024.07.048

== Awards ==
- BWH/Eleanor and Miles Shore Faculty Career Development Award (2012)
