= C17H17ClN6O2 =

The molecular formula C_{17}H_{17}ClN_{6}O_{2} (molar mass: 372.81 g/mol) may refer to:

- Dimdazenil
- PA-915
