= Tebideutorexant =

Chemical compound

Clinical data
- Other names: JNJ-61393215; JNJ-3215
- Routes of administration: Oral
- Drug class: Orexin receptor antagonist

Pharmacokinetic data
- Elimination half-life: 14–25 hours

Identifiers
- IUPAC name: {(1S,4R,6R)-3,3-dideuterio-6-[5-(trifluoromethyl)pyridin-2-yl]oxy-2-azabicyclo[2.2.1]heptan-2-yl}-[3-fluoro-2-(pyrimidin-2-yl)phenyl]methanone
- CAS Number: 1637681-55-0
- PubChem CID: 139030979
- ChemSpider: 76117730
- UNII: DQ7SMA8TWV
- ChEMBL: ChEMBL4776719

Chemical and physical data
- Formula: C_{23}H_{16}D_{2}F_{4}N_{4}O_{2}
- Molar mass: 460.428 g·mol^{−1}
- 3D model (JSmol): Interactive image
- SMILES: [2H]C1([2H])[C@H]2C[C@@H](Oc3ccc(C(F)(F)F)cn3)[C@H](C2)N1C(=O)c1cccc(F)c1-c1ncccn1
- InChI: InChI=1S/C23H18F4N4O2/c24-16-4-1-3-15(20(16)21-28-7-2-8-29-21)22(32)31-12-13-9-17(31)18(10-13)33-19-6-5-14(11-30-19)23(25,26)27/h1-8,11,13,17-18H,9-10,12H2/t13-,17+,18-/m1/s1/i12D2; Key:HUKWIAXQBOHZIX-USKNZQBOSA-N

Tebideutorexant (developmental code names JNJ-61393215, JNJ-3215) is an orexin antagonist medication which is under development for the treatment of depression and anxiety disorders. The drug was originated and developed by Janssen Pharmaceuticals.

It is an orally active compound and acts as a selective antagonist of the orexin OX_{1} receptor (1-SORA). Preliminary clinical findings suggest that tebideutorexant may have anti-panic effects in humans. The elimination half-life of tebideutorexant is 13.6 to 24.6 hours.

As of June 2023, tebideutorexant is in phase 2 clinical trials for the treatment of major depressive disorder while no further development has been reported for treatment of panic disorder and other anxiety disorders. In 2025, a phase 2a, double-blind, placebo-controlled trial in adults with major depressive disorder and anxious distress found that adjunctive tebideutorexant did not significantly improve depressive symptoms on the Hamilton Rating Scale for Depression or anxiety on the Hamilton Anxiety Rating Scale compared with placebo.

== See also ==
- List of investigational antidepressants
- List of investigational anxiolytics
