= Tasipimidine =

Clinical data
- Trade names: Tessie
- Other names: ODM-105; ODM105; ORM-19695; ORM19695
- Routes of administration: Dogs: Oral; Humans: unspecified
- Drug class: α_{2A}-Adrenergic receptor agonist; Anxiolytic; Sedative; Hypnotic

Identifiers
- IUPAC name: 2-(5-methoxy-3,4-dihydro-1H-isochromen-1-yl)-4,5-dihydro-1H-imidazole
- CAS Number: 1465908-70-6
- PubChem CID: 71767208
- ChemSpider: 64835228
- UNII: QX8MJH6HGK
- KEGG: D11635
- ChEMBL: ChEMBL4594267

Chemical and physical data
- Formula: C_{13}H_{16}N_{2}O_{2}
- Molar mass: 232.283 g·mol^{−1}
- 3D model (JSmol): Interactive image
- SMILES: COC1=CC=CC2=C1CCOC2C3=NCCN3
- InChI: InChI=1S/C13H16N2O2/c1-16-11-4-2-3-10-9(11)5-8-17-12(10)13-14-6-7-15-13/h2-4,12H,5-8H2,1H3,(H,14,15); Key:GHIKYGQWBRHEGU-UHFFFAOYSA-N

Tasipimidine (INN, USAN; developmental codes ODM-105 and ORM-19695; brand name Tessie) is an α_{2}-adrenergic receptor agonist which is approved for the short-term treatment of fear and anxiety in dogs. It is also under development for the treatment of insomnia in humans. The drug is used as an oral solution in dogs, whereas its route of administration for humans is unspecified.

The drug acts as a potent and selective full agonist of the human α_{2A}-adrenergic receptor. Conversely, it is a much weaker agonist of the rodent α_{2B}-, α_{2C}-, and α_{2D}-adrenergic receptors. In addition, it shows only low affinity for α_{1}-adrenergic receptors, where it appears to act as a partial agonist. Tasipimidine produces anxiolytic, sedative, hypolocomotor, hypotensive, and bradycardic effects in animals.

Tasipimidine is under development for use in humans by Orion Corporation. As of October 2024, it is in phase 2 clinical trials for this indication. The drug is or was also under development for the treatment of psychiatric disorders in humans, but no recent development for this indication has been reported. It has reached phase 1 trials for psychiatric disorders. Tasipimidine was approved for treatment of fear and anxiety in dogs in the European Union in 2021.

== See also ==
- List of investigational insomnia drugs
- Medetomidine
