= Sunobinop =

Chemical compound

Clinical data
- Other names: IMB-115
- Drug class: Nociceptin receptor agonist

Identifiers
- IUPAC name: 4-[(1R,5S)-9-[(1S,5S)-3-bicyclo[3.3.1]nonanyl]-9-azabicyclo[3.3.1]nonan-3-yl]-3-oxoquinoxaline-2-carboxylic acid
- CAS Number: 1126793-40-5
- PubChem CID: 155801560
- ChemSpider: 34950269
- UNII: I1X86U5474
- ChEMBL: ChEMBL4650344

Chemical and physical data
- Formula: C_{26}H_{33}N_{3}O_{3}
- Molar mass: 435.568 g·mol^{−1}
- 3D model (JSmol): Interactive image
- SMILES: O=C(O)C1=NC=2C=CC=CC2N(C1=O)C3CC4N(C(CCC4)C3)C5CC6CCCC(C5)C6
- InChI: InChI=1S/C26H33N3O3/c30-25-24(26(31)32)27-22-9-1-2-10-23(22)29(25)21-14-18-7-4-8-19(15-21)28(18)20-12-16-5-3-6-17(11-16)13-20/h1-2,9-10,16-21H,3-8,11-15H2,(H,31,32)/t16-,17-,18-,19+,21?/m0/s1; Key:COTYYZPYDJKKIS-MCXOOUIESA-N

Sunobinop (developmental code names V117957; IMB-115) is a high affinity small molecule nociceptin receptor partial agonist.

As of February 2024, it is under clinical investigation for the treatment of insomnia, alcohol use disorder, interstitial cystitis, and overactive bladder syndrome. It was previously also under investigation for the treatment of fibromyalgia.

== Pharmacology ==
Sunobinop has nanomolar affinity (K_{i}) and efficacy (EC_{50}) at human recombinant nociceptin/orphanin-FQ peptide (NOP) receptors. It has a high degree of functional selectivity for the NOP receptor. Sunobinop is a low affinity antagonist at human mu and kappa opioid receptors, and is a low affinity weak partial agonist at human delta opioid receptors.

== Clinical trials ==
Sunobinop was generally well tolerated in 3 studies involving 70 healthy subjects at doses that ranged from 0.6 to 30 mg. The most prominent adverse event was dose-dependent sedation/somnolence, which was more common at doses greater than 10 mg. In these studies, most of the absorbed sunobinop was excreted unchanged via rapid renal elimination.

The safety and effectiveness of sunobinop has not been evaluated by the FDA. There is no guarantee that sunobinop will successfully complete development or gain FDA approval.

== See also ==
- List of investigational insomnia drugs
- Nociceptin receptor
