= RTIOX-276 =

Orexin antagonist

Identifiers
- IUPAC name: 2-(1-(3,4-dimethoxybenzyl)-6-methoxy-7-(2,2,2-trifluoroethoxy)-3,4-dihydroisoquinolin-2(1H)-yl)-N-(pyridin-3-ylmethyl)acetamide
- CAS Number: 1451412-34-2
- PubChem CID: 73294135
- ChemSpider: 30820110
- ChEMBL: ChEMBL2418834
- CompTox Dashboard (EPA): DTXSID201336763

Chemical and physical data
- Formula: C_{29}H_{32}F_{3}N_{3}O_{5}
- Molar mass: 559.586 g·mol^{−1}
- 3D model (JSmol): Interactive image
- SMILES: O=C(NCC1=CC=CN=C1)CN2C(CC3=CC(OC)=C(OC)C=C3)C4=CC(OCC(F)(F)F)=C(OC)C=C4CC2
- InChI: InChI=1S/C29H32F3N3O5/c1-37-24-7-6-19(12-25(24)38-2)11-23-22-14-27(40-18-29(30,31)32)26(39-3)13-21(22)8-10-35(23)17-28(36)34-16-20-5-4-9-33-15-20/h4-7,9,12-15,23H,8,10-11,16-18H2,1-3H3,(H,34,36); Key:KFNSZWWIIUHELF-UHFFFAOYSA-N

RTIOX-276 is an orexin antagonist. RTIOX-276 binds selectively to the orexin 1 receptor (K_{E} = 8.5nM) and lacks significant affinity for the orexin 2 receptor (K_{E} = > 10,000nM). RTIOX-276 may have therapeutic utility for the treatment of cocaine addiction. In conditioned place preference studies, RTIOX-276 attenuated the development of place preference in mice exposed to cocaine.
