= SVT-4A1011 =

Clinical data
- Other names: SVT4A1011
- Routes of administration: Oral
- Drug class: Live biotherapeutic product

SVT-4A1011 is a live biotherapeutic product which is under development for the treatment of insomnia. It is taken orally. The drug consists of selected bacteria species naturally found in the gastrointestinal tract with potential effects on the gut–brain axis. A patent by its developer on methods for improving sleep quality specifically highlights species including Lactobacillus plantarum and Lactobacillus zeae among others. SVT-4A1011 is under development by Servatus Biopharmaceuticals. As of October 2022, it is in phase 1/2 clinical trials for insomnia.

== See also ==
- List of investigational insomnia drugs
