= Chronodisruption =

Disruption of the body's biological rhythms

Chronodisruption is a concept in the field of circadian biology that refers to the disturbance or alteration of the body's natural biological rhythms, for example the sleep-wake cycle, due to various environmental factors. The human body is synchronized to a 24-hour light-dark cycle, which is essential for maintaining optimal health and well-being. However, modern lifestyles —which involve exposure to artificial light (especially during nighttime), irregular sleep schedules, and shift work — can disrupt this natural rhythm, leading to a range of adverse physiological outcomes. Chronodisruption has been linked to a variety of health disorders and diseases, including neurodegenerative diseases, diabetes, mood disorders, cardiovascular disease, and cancer. Such disruptors can lead to dysregulation of hormones and neurotransmitters, though researchers continue to investigate the physiological implications of chronodisruption. Indeed, research in chronobiology is rapidly advancing, with an increasing focus on understanding the underlying mechanisms of chronodisruption and developing strategies to prevent or mitigate its adverse effects. This includes the development of pharmacological interventions, as well as lifestyle modifications such as optimizing one's sleeping environment and timing of meals and physical activity.

== Chronodisruption and cancer ==
People with chronodisruption have increased risk for certain types of cancer. Chronodisruption is demonstrated to have a causal role in cancer cell growth and tumor progression in rodents. In 2020, the International Agency for Research on Cancer (IARC) found that chronodisruption due to chronic night-shift work is a probable carcinogen (cancer-causing agent) in humans.

=== In humans ===
- Chronodisruption, in the form of shift work, increases the risk of breast cancer in women by about 50%. The risk of developing other forms of cancers, such as prostate cancer in men and colorectal cancer in women, may also increase with chronodisruption; studies in this area have shown modest, but statistically significant, associations. Chronodisruption is associated with impeded homeostasis of the cell cycle; this is correlated with malignant growth acceleration and cancer, potentially due to obstruction of normal DNA damage repair.

=== In model organisms ===
- In the studies investigating the relationship between experimental chronic jet lag and tumor progression done by Filipski et al., mice were kept under either 12:12 Light-Dark cycles (LD cycles) or under 12:12 LD cycles that would phase-advance by eight hours every two days. Upon injection with Glasgow osteosarcoma cells, a rapid acceleration in cancer cell proliferation rate was observed in the mice experiencing an 8-hour phase advance every two days compared to the mice not experiencing phase advance. Moreover, clock gene expressions (e.g. mPer2) were suppressed in mice subjected to repeated phase advance, while the daily rhythm in clock gene expression was maintained in mice in a typical 12:12 LD cycle. The down-regulation of the p53 gene and over-expression of the c-Myc gene associated with the clock disturbance may also have contributed to tumor progression.
  - Melatonin is known to be an endogenously produced oncostatic agent that inhibits tumor cell growth via various potential mechanisms. Studies showed that perfusing the human breast cancer xenografts growing in animals in melatonin-rich blood collected from premenopausal women significantly inhibited all signs of rapid cancer cell proliferation. On the other hand, melatonin-deficient blood collected from the same set of women failed to restrict tumor growth. In the originals studies done by Filipski et al., a mouse strain named B6D2F_{1}, which had a low level of circulating melatonin, was used. Although no definite conclusion can be made on the possible effects of melatonin on cancer development in B6D2F_{1} mice based on the original studies, a general statement can be made: besides the direct effects of internal desynchronization with the external environment, the accelerated rate of cancer cell proliferation may also be a consequence of relative melatonin deficiency caused by chronodisruption.
- Extreme cases of chronic jet lag (6-hour advances every week last equal to or more than 4 weeks under experimental setting) were observed to cause premature death in aged male mice compared to their counterparts kept in stable external LD cycles. This consequence was not observed in mice experiencing chronic phase delays. This showed that persistent internal desynchronization as a result of repeated phase advances may be associated with reduced longevity. The findings may have great implications for shift workers and people that frequently experience transmeridian travels that advance their internal clock.
- Recent studies since 2016 in mice have shown that chronic jet-lag models accelerates tumorigenesis in genetic models of lung cancer, liver cancer, colorectal cancer, and skin cancer. It has been suggested that chronodisruption is an "Hallmark of Systemic Disease".

== Chronodisruption and cardiovascular disease ==
Chronodisruption is correlated with an increased risk for cardiovascular disease in humans. Experiments involving light-dark cycle manipulations, internal period mutations, and clock gene disruptions in rodents provide insights into the relationship between chronodisruption and the risk of cardiovascular diseases.

=== In humans ===
- Chronodisruption is associated with a significantly increased risk of cardiovascular disease in humans. Shift work has been implicated as a major risk factor for coronary heart disease, hypertension, ischemic stroke, and sudden cardiac death. Social jet lag, discrepancy between the schedule of working days and free days or misalignment between biological time and social time, may also be associated with increases in cardiovascular disease risk, as evidenced by increased triglyceride levels, decreased high-density lipoprotein-cholesterol levels, and decreased insulin sensitivity.

=== In model organisms ===
- Mice exposed to a shortened 10:10 LD cycle (20-hour cycle) were observed to exhibit symptoms of abnormal cardiac pathophysiology, including decreased levels of cardiomyocytes and vascular smooth muscle cell hypertrophy, compared to mice in a typical 12:12 LD cycle (24-hour). These symptoms were rescued when the mice were subsequently exposed to the typical 24-hour LD cycle. Mutant mice with a 22-hour intrinsic period were affected with symptoms of cardiomyopathy and early death as a result when put under a 24-hour LD cycle; however, their cardiac functions were normalized under a shortened LD cycle (22-hour cycle) that matched their intrinsic period.
- Experiment simulating "shift-work" in mice (keep mice awake for 6 hours during their inactive period for several days) showed that mice misaligned with the external LD cycle had decreased metabolic efficiency and disrupted cardiac function.
- Deletion or mutation of core clock genes (e.g. Bmal1, Clock, Npas2) was shown to have an adverse impact on cardiac function, including attenuating glucose utilization, accelerating cardiomyopathy, and reducing longevity.

== Chronodisruption and metabolic disorders ==
Food is a strong Zeitgeber for peripheral clocks, and the timing of food intake can disrupt or amplify the coordination between the central pacemaker and peripheral systems. This misalignment can lead to detrimental effects on metabolic health, including symptoms like insulin resistance and increased body mass.

=== In humans ===
- There is an increased risk of Type 2 diabetes associated with shift work, with even higher risks among rotating shift or night shift workers and health care workers. Chronodisruption has been shown to disturb the regulation of glucose and insulin in the body, providing a potential pathway for this increased risk.
- Additionally, shift workers exhibit a higher risk for obesity than day workers, which increases with the number of years exposed and the frequency of shifts. It is hypothesized that circadian regulation of hormonal secretion related to appetite, as well as the presence of circadian clocks in adipose tissue cells, may influence the increased obesity risk related to shift work, although further study will be necessary to confirm this pathway.
- Timing of the food intake matching the proper circadian phase is also essential. Cross-sectional studies done by Wang et al. demonstrated that people who consumed ≥ 33% of their daily energy intake in the evening were two-fold more likely to become obese than those who received their energy intake in the morning. Hence, timing of food intake is also correlated with obesity.

=== In model organisms ===
- Swiss Webster mice (an all-purpose mouse strain used as a research model) that have altered timings of food intake due to exposure to artificial light at subjective night gained weight substantially beyond the control mice that were placed under a regular light-dark cycle.
  - The experimental design that included light exposure at night would have led to a reduction of nighttime melatonin level and disturbed the melatonin rhythm. Melatonin was suggested to have anti-obesity effects due to its ability to stimulate the growth and metabolic activity of Brown Adipose Tissue, inducing weight loss. The relative melatonin deficiency due to light exposure at night may lead to obesity. However, melatonin level was not measured in the original experiments. More recent articles also suggested that the majority of laboratory mouse strains, including the Swiss Webster mice, do not produce melatonin on their own. Thus, the role of melatonin in the metabolic consequences of circadian misalignment caused by altered timings of food intake remains unclear.
- Mice fed with a high-fat, obesogenic diet showed dampened rhythms in feeding and dampened hepatic circadian rhythms, promoting hyperphagia and obesity. Studies investigating the effect of isocaloric time-restricted feeding (TRF) discovered that mice fed with a high-fat diet (HFD) in an 8-to-12-hour window during the normal feeding time (subjective night) had significantly less weight gain than the mice fed with HFD during the time when feeding is normally reduced (subjective day). This observation in mice suggested that the timing of food intake is associated with obesity.
- Chronodisruption is often associated with shortened sleep. Studies using rodents demonstrate that sleep deprivation, which leads to a reduced leptin level (the "satiety hormone") and an increased ghrelin level (the "hunger hormone"), encourages increased food intake.
- Experiments investigating clock gene mutants and knockouts show the strong linkage between obesity, metabolic disorders, and the circadian clock. ClockΔ19 mice with disrupted circadian rhythm (Clock gene mutant mice) have dampened diurnal feeding rhythm and are obese. ClockΔ19 mice with leptin knockout are significantly more obese than mice with leptin knockout only, implying the significant contribution of chronodisruption to obesity in mice. Similarly, mPer2-knockout mice fed a high-fat diet were significantly more obese than their wild-type counterpart.

== Menstrual cycle ==
Chronodisruption, in the form of shift work, has been associated with disturbances in menstrual period (increased irregularity and length of cycles) and mood. This deterioration of the menstrual cycle has also been shown to increase with increasing duration of chronodisruption.

Chronodisruption, including shift work and social jet lag, has been linked to significant disturbances in menstrual regularity, manifesting as increased cycle irregularity and extended cycle lengths, as well as mood disruptions. The severity of menstrual cycle disruptions appears to correlate positively with the duration of exposure to chronodisruptive conditions, suggesting a cumulative negative impact. While some researchers have proposed that menstrual irregularities might serve as indicators of intolerance or vulnerability to shift work, current evidence is insufficient to justify restricting women from night-shift employment solely on these grounds.

Female reproduction is regulated by the suprachiasmatic nucleus (SCN), the master circadian pacemaker in the brain. In particularly, SCN-derived nueropeptides like vasoactive intestinal polypeptide (VIP) and vasopressin (AVP) are critical for stimulating the secretion of gonadotropin-releasing hormone (GnRH). GnRH subsequently triggers the anterior pituitary gland to release luteinizing hormone (LH) and follicle-stimulating hormone (FSH), hormones essential for ovulation and follicular recruitment. Studies in mice have demonstrated that abnormal or disrupted light-dark (LD) cycles and generic altercations to circadian clock components, including CLOCK, cry1, and AVP, significantly reduce the amplitude of GnRH and LH surges. Such disruptions impair ovulation and disturb the regularity of estrous cycles. Furthermore, research has indicated that the administration of AVP specifically during the afternoon can induce LH release in mice during the proestrus stage, the critical period preceding ovulation, highlighting the circadian-dependent nature of reproductive hormone regulation.

Researchers also found rhythmic expression patterns of circadian genes within the ovary, which play crucial roles in steroidogenesis, and follicular maturation. Experimental evidence from mice with global deletion of Bmal1 revealed premature aging phenotypes characterized by ovarian shrinkage, weight loss, delayed onset of puberty, and decreased rates of ovulation, highlighting the essential function of circadian genes in reproductive health and timing. In humans, studies have observed that decreased expression of circadian genes such as per1 and CLOCK in older women partially explains the age-related decline in fertility and reduced steroidogenesis. Additionally, previous animal experiments demonstrated that continuous exposure to light induces symptoms resembling polyendocrine metabolic ovarian syndrome (PMOS), including hormonal imbalance and metabolic disruptions, further underscoring the sensitivity of reproductive physiology to circadian disruption. Moreover, targeted silencing of the CLOCK gene using short hairpin RNA (shRNA) in rodent models resulted in significantly decreased oocyte counts, elevated rates of cellular apoptosis, and increased risk of miscarriage, illustrating the direct impact of clock genes on ovarian viability and fertility outcomes.

== Maternal chronodisruption ==
Maternal chronodisruption refers to the misalignment of a mother's circadian rhythms during pregnancy due to external or internal factors, such as shift work, irregular sleep patterns, exposure to artificial light at night, or metabolic disturbances. Circadian rhythms are ~24 hour oscillating endogenous cycles generated through the transcription translation feedback loop (TTFL). In TTFL, proteins CLOCK and BMAL1 induce the transcription of period genes per1 and per2 and cryptochrome genes cry1 and cry2. These genes are translated into proteins, which then dimerize and re-enter the nucleus to inhibit CLOCK and BMAL1, thereby suppressing their own transcription. This feedback loop continually cycles as inhibitory proteins degrade and become transcribed again, maintaining a consistent period of ~24 hours. Proper functioning of these circadian rhythms is critical for human physiological homeostasis. Disruption or alteration of these rhythms, termed chronodisruption, has numerous negative physiological consequences, including impaired reproductive health and fertility in both males and females, weakened immune responses, and metabolic dysregulation. Maternal chronodisruption, specifically, poses additional risks due to its impact on fetal development; it has been linked to adverse pregnancy outcomes, such as pre-eclampsia and preterm birth, as well as long-term consequences including increased risk for metabolic disorders and neurodevelopmental impairments in offspring.

Chronodisruption during human pregnancy is also associated with various negative outcomes, including low relative birth weight, preterm birth, and miscarriage.

Chronodisruption in model organisms has a detrimental effect on the reproduction and development of offspring in rodents. Both clock gene mutations and experiencing phase advances or delays after copulation were observed to interfere with the ability to complete pregnancies. Deletion of the key clock gene, Bmal1, in mouse ovaries significantly reduces oocyte fertilization, early embryo development, and implantation. Gestational chronodisruption (clock misalignment during pregnancy) induced by chronic phase shift is linked with detrimental effects on the health of mouse progeny, including persistent metabolic, cardiovascular, and cognitive dysfunctions. However, these conditions were reversed when the chronodisrupted mother received melatonin in the subjective night, suggesting that maternal plasma melatonin rhythm may drive the fetal rhythm.

=== Pregnancy ===
Evidence suggests that the circadian rhythm influences early embryo development, uterine implantation, placentation, and delivery. Studies in mice and humans display the different types of chronodisruption that can affect those various aspects of pregnancy and gestation.

==== In mice ====
Phase shift, or alterations to the circadian rhythm, induced by adjusting the LD cycle in mice's environment after mice copulation was shown to reduce proportion of pregnancies carried to term. Similarly, genetic disruption in CLOCK genes in mice impaired the ability to be pregnant and to maintain pregnancy. An experiment in mice showed that deletion of Bmal1 resulted in early pregnancy loss and reentry into estrus while 95% of the control mice were able to give birth to pups. Bmal1-deleted mice has either completely missing or underdeveloped implantation sites from down-regulation of Star gene product, which is essential for steroidogenesis, suggesting infertility from implantation failure. Transplant of WT ovary in Bmal1-deleted mice rescued implantation and live birth, while that of Bmal1-deleted mice into WT mice led to decreases live birth.

It was also found that long photoperiodic exposure, 18 hours of light instead of 12 hours per 24-hour cycle, led to a significantly reduced number of implantation sites in mice. However, repetitive phase advances created no difference in pup and placental weights or uterine receptivity and maintenance of early gestation, suggesting that the detrimental effects of chronodisruption act upstream of implantation, possibly by influencing embryo quality or early developmental processes. Yet, it is reported that chronic phase shift throughout gestation in mice alters rhythms of multiple hormones, timing in food intake, the circadian clock of the liver, and metabolic gene expression. Maternal exposure to chronic photoperiod shifting was shown to increase pregnancy duration and result in heavier offspring. It also led to abnormal hormone rhythms and increased inflammation markers in female offspring. These effects were shown to be rescued by maternal supplementation of melatonin, the key hormone in regulating sleep-wake cycle and circadian rhythms.

==== In humans ====
There's limited study on the rhythmic secretion of melatonin during pregnancy but evidence suggests an increased nighttime melatonin secretion as the pregnancy progresses, that quickly diminishes postpartum, with no significant change in daytime secretion.

Though evidence is lacking regarding the role of insemination timing on embryo viability, it is hypothesized that inappropriate uterine CLOCK gene expression could contribute to the relatively low fertility rates observed in humans.

Shift work during pregnancy has been associated with several adverse reproductive outcomes, including increased gestation length in twin pregnancies, higher risk of endometriosis, elevated miscarriage rates, greater incidence of low birth weight, and a heightened likelihood of early—but not late—preterm births. Additionally, abnormal expression of the CLOCK gene has been observed in human fetal tissues obtained from spontaneous miscarriages, suggesting a potential mechanistic link between circadian disruption and pregnancy loss. The CLOCK gene is also implicated in pregnancy-related complications such as preeclampsia, pregnancy induced hypertension, and elevated urine protein levels, further underscoring the importance of maintaining circadian integrity during pregnancy for maternal-fetal health outcomes.

==== Lactation ====
In a rodent model, exposure to constant light during lactation was found to increase weight gain in offspring and disrupt daily rhythms of glucose and fat levels. Notably, even when these offspring were later exposed to a standard light-dark cycle, their metabolic rhythms and the expression of circadian markers in the SCN remained impaired, suggesting permanent damage to the SCN.

In cows, exposure to chronic phase shifts during the prepartum period was associated with increased milk fat and milk yield postpartum and decreased blood glucose pre- and postpartum, suggesting that a more stable circadian environment facilitates the initiation of lactogenesis. Melatonin is also shown to support the development of the mammary glands for breastfeeding.

=== Fetal and postnatal development ===
Studies in several species reported the necessity of a functional molecular circadian clock for developmental processes and the release of reproductive hormones into the fetal bloodstream, whose disruptions could influence fetal organ development in utero and long-term health.

==== Fetal development ====
The fetal pineal gland does not secrete melatonin in human, sheep, or rats, and the fetus circadian rhythm is primarily controlled by the maternal melatonin that pass freely through the placenta and provides light-to-dark information to the fetus. The exact transformation mechanism is still being investigated.

Mice deficient in melatonin had negative alterations on pregnancy, including fetal organ development, neurodevelopmental, and cognitive functions in their offspring. However, mice with mutations in CLOCK that still produced melatonin had normal pregnancy outcomes. Melatonin appears to play a protective role by reducing cell apoptosis and may improve placental perfusion and protect against oxidative stress and hypoxic injury. In animal models, maternal melatonin pretreatment reduced placental inflammation following bacterial exposure, though more robust, dose-dependent studies are needed. Additional findings suggest melatonin improves placental perfusion and protects against oxidative stress and hypoxic injury. Circadian disruption may also influence placental metabolism. Elevated BMAL1 expression in placentas is shown to be associated with increased fat levels.

==== Postnatal development into adulthood ====
Animal studies suggest that maternal chronodisruption during pregnancy can impair fetal and postnatal metabolic and circadian regulation. In rats, chronic phase shifts throughout gestation led to adult offspring with insulin resistance, obesity, and metabolic syndrome. Disruptions also affect adrenal function and fetal gene expression, potentially leading to long-term adverse physiological effects. Offspring of mothers exposed to chronic phase shift (CPS), or prolonged interruption to the circadian rhythm, had constant low level of melatonin, reversed corticosterone rhythms, and disrupted rhythm in heart rate and adrenal stress hormone corticosterone important for adaptation. Maternal circadian preferences were also found to be associated with infants' sleep rhythm in early childhood. Increased maternal eveningness, or having a later chronotype, was associated with slower circadian rhythm development in infants at 3, 8, 18 and 24 months. It created different effects at different ages of the infant: it was associated with shorter sleep duration during daytime at 8 months and during nighttime at 3 and 8 months, to long sleep-onset latency at 3,18 and 24 months, to late bedtime at 3, 8 and 18 months, and to the prevalence of parent-reported sleep difficulties at 8 and 24 months.

In rodent models, when mothers experienced chronodisruption and photoperiod reversal during pregnancy, it was observed that male offspring experienced body weight gain, glucose homeostasis, adipose tissue content, adipose tissue response to norepinephrine, and adipose tissue proteomic in the basal condition in both standard diet and high fat diet lifestyles.

In female offspring, maternal CPS resulted in disrupted hormone rhythms, higher levels of inflammatory markers, Interleukin 1-alpha(IL-1a) and Interleukin 6 (IL-6), as well as lower levels of anti-inflammatory Interleukin 10 (IL-10) markers, and altered gene activity in vital organs such as the heart, kidney, and adrenal gland.

Chronodisruption during gestation affects adult offspring negatively. Research has found that gestational chronodisruption can lead to abnormal stress behavior, disrupted daily hormone patterns, poor response to stress hormones, lower global DNA methylation, and steroid hormone CLOCK related genes becoming out of sync in adult offspring.

== Chronodisruption and neurodegenerative diseases ==
=== In humans ===
Chronodisruption has also been implicated as a risk factor for neurodegenerative diseases such as Parkinson's Disease (PD) and Alzheimer's Disease (AD) in humans.

- Circadian regulation of metabolism and dopamine levels are hypothesized to contribute to the link between chronodisruption and PD.
- Increased risk for AD may be influenced by increased levels of t-tau protein in the blood due to sleep loss, as well as certain AD-risk genes which are suggested to be controlled by the circadian clock, though these factors are still under investigation.
- Sleep loss in pre-pathological stages of AD might be correlated with future pathological progression, including the increase of Amyloid-beta 42 in cerebrospinal fluid.

=== In model organisms ===
- The misalignment between the sleep/wake cycle and feeding rhythms in mice causes circadian desynchrony between the SCN and hippocampus. Mice exposed to "jet lag" experimental conditions experience circadian misalignment, exhibiting an increased amount of inflammatory markers in blood, diminished hippocampus neurogenesis, and impaired learning and memory.
- Being exposed to altered LD cycles (e.g. 10:10 LD cycle) also disrupts SCN-mediated rhythms and causes peripheral metabolic alterations in mice, leading to decreased dendritic branching of cortical neurons, decreased cognitive flexibility, and behavioral impairments.

== Notable researchers ==
Chronodisruption first became a notable concept in 2003 when three researchers from the University of Cologne in Germany, Thomas C. Erren, Russel J. Reiter, and Claus Piekarski, published the journal, Light, timing of biological rhythms, and chronodisruption in man. At the time, Erren, Reiter, and Piekarski were studying how biological clocks can be used to understand cycles and causes of cancer, suggesting that cancer follows a rhythmic light cycle. These three men are considered to have conceived the term "chronodisruption", making large conceptual strides from "chronodisturbance", and even further, "circadian disruption". Circadian disruption is a brief or long period of interference within a circadian rhythm. Chronodisturbance is the disruption of a circadian rhythm which leads to adaptive changes, leading to a less substantial negative impact in comparison to chronodisruption, which leads to disease. Another notable researcher in the field is Mary E. Harrington.

Thomas C. Erren is currently still employed by the University of Cologne, where his research focuses on intersections between chronobiology and disease in terms of prevention.

Russel Reiter is employed by UT Health, San Antonio and involved in processes of aging and disease, specifically how oxygen interacts with neurodegenerative diseases. His research group is also studying properties of melatonin, its relations with circadian disruptions, and the resulting physiology.

Mary E. Harrington is employed by Smith College, where she is the head of their neuroscience program. Her research is focused on the impact of disruptions to the central and peripheral clocks, as well as the impact of disruptions on Alzheimer's and aging.
