= Social jetlag =

Sleep disorder

Social jetlag, similar to jet lag, is a circadian misalignment. The term "social jetlag" was first coined in 2006 by German scientist Till Roenneberg and colleagues, and they define it as "the discrepancy of work and free days, between social and biological time." This means that one's biological clock does not align with their social obligations, whether it be work or otherwise. Since the term's initial coinage, the term has become widely used and understood. According to PubMed, at least 26 articles have been published on social jetlag as of April 2025. Additionally, many papers have since been published exploring how social jetlag specifically affects health outcomes.

== How to calculate social jetlag ==
Social jetlag is calculated by the difference in the midpoint of sleep on workdays and free days. The midpoint is the halfway point between bedtime and wake time. The larger the difference, the more extreme the jetlag.

Social jetlag = midpoint of sleep on workdays — midpoint of sleep on free days.

== Discovery ==
In the 2006 study from Till Roenneberg and Marc Wittmann, they were credited as being the first people to explore the phenomenon that they termed "social jetlag." Their initial investigations included questionnaires for 501 participants. The participants answered questions relating to their sleep quality, current psychological well-being, retrospective psychological well-being from the past week, and consumption of stimulants (e.g. caffeine or nicotine). Roenneberg and Wittmann's findings interestingly showed a strong positive correlation between late chronotypes and smoking habits, among other stimulants. This means that people with late chronotypes were more likely to take part in stimulant usage. The work of Roenneberg and his lab paved the way for further research on the concept of social jetlag and how the mismatch between social obligations and chronotype can impact ones' habits and health.

== Causes ==
Social jetlag arises from a mismatch between an individual's internal biological clock and the external demands of society, particularly work and school obligations. This misalignment is influenced by several interrelated factors:

=== Chronotype variability ===
Chronotype can be defined using actual sleep-wake timing (Munich Chronotype Questionnaire) or an individual's preference for earlier or later sleep and wake times. Chronotype plays a central role in the development of social jetlag. Evening chronotypes (commonly referred to as "night owls") are particularly susceptible, as their internal clocks are naturally delayed relative to societal norms. As a result, they often accumulate a significant sleep debt during work or school days, which they attempt to compensate for by sleeping in on free days, further exacerbating circadian misalignment. Population-level data suggest that over 70% of people experience at least one hour of social jetlag per week, with evening chronotypes reporting the highest average misalignment.

=== Light exposure and technology use ===
Exposure to artificial light, particularly blue light from electronic devices, in the evening hours can suppress melatonin production and delay circadian phase. This delay may conflict with early morning obligations, leading to later bedtimes and greater weekday misalignment. On the other hand, insufficient morning light exposure can fail to advance the circadian clock, which reinforces delayed sleep phases. Some research also suggests evening light may blunt circadian amplitude, potentially making weekday realignment more difficult, though the specific mechanisms aren't fully clear.

=== Work and school schedules ===
Fixed early-morning start times for work and education are among the most significant external pressures leading to social jetlag. These schedules are typically optimized for morning chronotypes, forcing individuals with later circadian preferences to truncate their sleep duration or shift their natural sleep phase, leading to chronic sleep misalignment. This effect is most pronounced in adolescents and young adults, whose circadian systems tend to shift later during puberty, creating a mismatch between biological and institutional timing.

=== Use of alarm clocks ===
Alarm clocks interrupt natural sleep timing by enforcing externally determined wake times. Individuals who consistently wake to alarms are more likely to have a discrepancy between their biological and social clocks. However, alarm use is more likely a consequence of misalignment than a cause, as people with later chronotypes may rely on alarms because their natural wake time is out of sync with societal schedules. This regular artificial truncation of sleep contributes to the accumulation of social jetlag across the week. Studies have shown that the need for an alarm clock correlates with greater social jetlag severity, serving as a proxy for insufficient alignment between internal and external timing cues.

=== Social and recreational activities ===
Evening social activities and screen time can push bedtime later, particularly among adolescents and young adults. These behavioral patterns, when combined with rigid weekday wake times, contribute to a widened gap between sleep timing on workdays and free days, which is a defining feature of social jetlag. "Catch-up sleep" on weekends, while often used to recover sleep debt, may result in greater sleep timing variability across the week. This irregularity, rather than catch-up sleep itself, is what contributes to circadian disruption.

== Measurement and assessment ==
Social jetlag is typically assessed through subjective questionnaires and objective physiological measurements.

=== Munich Chronotype Questionnaire ===
The Munich Chronotype Questionnaire is a widely used tool that assesses habitual sleep-wake timing separately for workdays and free days. Chronotype is calculated based on the midpoint of sleep on free days, adjusted for oversleep to account for weekday sleep debt. Social jetlag is quantified as the absolute difference between mid-sleep on free days and mid-sleep on workdays, providing a measure of circadian misalignment.

However, a limitation of the questionnaire is its reliance on structured work schedules, restricting its applicability in populations with flexible schedules or culturally relaxed attitudes towards work timing. Additionally, the MCTQ simplifies sleep compensation by focusing primarily on circadian influences, even though sleep timing is also significantly regulated by homeostatic mechanisms.

=== Actigraphy ===
Actigraphy objectively measures sleep-wake cycles through wrist-worn accelerometers recording wrist movements, analyzed with specialized software algorithms. This method estimates total sleep time (TST), sleep efficiency, and wake after sleep onset, though its accuracy for sleep-onset latency (SOL) and daytime sleep estimation is limited. Actigraphy-derived Mid Sleep Phase (MSP) on workdays and free days is used to calculate social jetlag, defined as the difference between these values. Studies employing actigraphy have linked higher social jetlag with impaired cognitive and motor functions.

=== Theoretical and psychological considerations ===
The dual-oscillator circadian model theorizes two coupled oscillators—morning and evening—responding differently to environmental light cues. This model elucidates circadian misalignment phenomena, including phase shifts and rhythm splitting under constant conditions, and provides insights into biological entrainment variability.

The interaction of these oscillators can explain complex circadian phenomena such as internal desynchronization and rhythm splitting, which occur when environmental signals are inconsistent or absent, leading each oscillator to run independently and display distinct rhythmic patterns. Coupling within these oscillators contributes to the robustness and stability of circadian timing, allowing organisms to adapt flexibly to changing environmental conditions. Thus, Pittendrigh's dual-oscillator model provides a theoretical framework to understand circadian misalignment phenomena, including social jetlag, by elucidating how variability in internal oscillator coupling influences individual responses to environmental cues.

Additionally, psychological factors, such as expectations about jet lag severity, significantly influence symptom intensity. Research has shown that expectations prior to travel predict jet lag symptoms more accurately than traditional circadian metrics, emphasizing the importance of integrating psychological assessments in social jetlag evaluation.

== Health implications ==
=== Obesity and related conditions ===
Social jet lag has been linked to obesity, body mass index, and waist circumference. Similarly, studies have associated social jet lag with an inability to follow healthy diets, but a direct link establishing causality has not yet been established. Furthermore, laboratory controlled circadian-misalignment experiments found that shifted or misaligned sleep-wake schedules significantly increased postprandial Ghrelin levels, a hormone that stimulates hunger, and appetite for energy-dense foods, suggesting that there may be a biological mechanism linking social jetlag with an increased risk for obesity. Social jet lag has also been linked to metabolic disorders such as type 2 diabetes and insulin resistance, with several studies reporting associations between social jet lag and impaired glucose metabolism, though variations in measurement methods and lack of sleep debt correction limit the strength of these conclusions. Further longitudinal and experimental studies are needed to determine whether social jet lag directly contributes to these health issues or if the observed relationships are confounded by other lifestyle or environmental factors.

=== Psychiatric effects ===
Social jet lag has also been associated with adverse mental health outcomes, including mood disorders like major depressive disorder and bipolar disorder. Large-scale and cross-sectional studies have found a positive correlation between social jet lag and the severity of depressive symptoms. However, findings remain inconsistent, as some studies, including those involving patients with depression have not observed significant differences compared to healthy controls. Research on other psychiatric conditions, such as anxiety and ADHD, has yielded mixed results, underscoring the need for further studies using objective and standardized methodologies.

=== Reduced performance ===
Reduced sleep duration and poor sleep quality have also been connected with social jet lag, particularly among evening chronotypes. A recent study found that individuals with high social jet lag exhibited lower heart rate variability, a marker of poor sleep quality. This is particularly evident in shift workers, who often experience up to three hours of social jet lag due to irregular schedules. This diminished sleep quality may impair the restorative function of sleep, leading to increased fatigue, reduced alertness, and poorer academic or workplace performance. Similarly, social jetlag has been associated with cardiovascular disease risk like higher triglyceride levels.

== Mitigation strategies ==
=== Light interventions ===
Entrainment by light exposure, specifically the duration, intensity, time of day, and wavelength can impact circadian rhythms and exacerbate or alleviate social jetlag. As such, light interventions are generally the first step in circadian treatment. Specifically, blue light is known to induce melatonin suppression that results in later bedtimes which can exacerbate social jetlag. Reducing blue light at the end of the day can help increase melatonin excretion earlier in the night, leading to earlier bedtimes. Blue light reduction means limiting electronic device use (ie. phones, TVs, computers, etc.) or wearing color-tinted (normally orange) glasses. While increasing light exposure earlier in the morning can help elevate mood and circadian entrainment, there are no explicit benefits in solving social jetlag, but can be a point of future study. While there are general benefits of reducing blue light exposure during bedtime, there is little known about the effectiveness of light interventions. There are too many factors that cannot be controlled, including timing of light exposure, ambient lighting, and individual variability. There are no other current mitigation strategies but further look into interventions of travel jet lag, such as melatonin administration and pharmacotherapy are being examined.

=== Reducing the difference between social and biological clock ===
Another possibility to limit social jetlag includes reducing the difference between the social clock on free days and the enforced schedule on work days. A study shows that later school start times for adolescent children can help students with late chronotypes get sufficient sleep. In fact, younger adults generally prefer waking up later as a whole, so shifting school days can help minimize the effects of social jetlag.

== Limitations ==
- Social jetlag is only one measure of chronodisruption. Other forms include shift work or other diseases that can affect circadian rhythms.
- There is lack of research on the biological mechanisms that underlie social jetlag.
- Social jetlag is only diagnosed through subjective surveys such as the Munich Chronotype Questionnaire which makes diagnosis less accurate and does not account for variability between work and free days.
- While social jetlag is correlated to negative health outcomes, there is no research on the direct cause of disease.

== See also ==
- Delayed sleep phase disorder
