= YZG-331 =

Clinical data
- Other names: N^{6}-[(S)-1-(Phenyl)propyl]adenosine
- Drug class: Adenosine receptor agonist; Sedative; Hypnotic
- ATC code: None

Identifiers
- IUPAC name: (2R,3S,4R,5R)-2-(hydroxymethyl)-5-[6-[[(1S)-1-phenylpropyl]amino]purin-9-yl]oxolane-3,4-diol
- PubChem CID: 54282370

Chemical and physical data
- Formula: C_{19}H_{23}N_{5}O_{4}
- Molar mass: 385.424 g·mol^{−1}
- 3D model (JSmol): Interactive image
- SMILES: CC[C@@H](C1=CC=CC=C1)NC2=C3C(=NC=N2)N(C=N3)[C@H]4[C@@H]([C@@H]([C@H](O4)CO)O)O
- InChI: InChI=1S/C19H23N5O4/c1-2-12(11-6-4-3-5-7-11)23-17-14-18(21-9-20-17)24(10-22-14)19-16(27)15(26)13(8-25)28-19/h3-7,9-10,12-13,15-16,19,25-27H,2,8H2,1H3,(H,20,21,23)/t12-,13+,15+,16+,19+/m0/s1; Key:RRRLUFHDFDNPMZ-BPAMBQHCSA-N

YZG-331, also known as N^{6}-[(S)-1-(phenyl)propyl]adenosine, is an adenosine receptor agonist which is or was under investigation for the potential treatment of insomnia.

== Pharmacology ==
The drug appears to act through the adenosine A_{1} and A_{2A} receptors. It produces sedative and hypnotic effects and hypolocomotion in animals. The drug is orally active and crosses the blood–brain barrier, although its intestinal absorption and central permeability may be reduced by its P-glycoprotein substrate activity. It is a synthetic derivative of adenosine and of N^{6}-(4-hydroxybenzyl)adenine riboside (NHBA). The latter compound is found in the traditional Chinese medicinal herb Gastrodia elata.

== Development ==
YZG-331 was first described in the scientific literature by at least 2014. As of 2025, it has reached the preclinical research stage of development.

== See also ==
- List of investigational insomnia drugs
