= NBI-75043 =

Clinical data
- Other names: NBI75043; NBI-1; "Compound 2a"
- Routes of administration: Oral
- Drug class: H_{1} receptor antagonist; Antihistamine; Sedative; Hypnotic
- ATC code: None

Pharmacokinetic data
- Elimination half-life: Oral: 6.7 hours IV: 9.1 hours

Identifiers
- IUPAC name: N,N-dimethyl-2-[3-[(1R)-1-pyridin-2-ylethyl]-1-benzothiophen-2-yl]ethanamine
- CAS Number: 873693-47-1
- PubChem CID: 11580427
- ChemSpider: 9755193
- UNII: EJG9C09D7R
- ChEMBL: ChEMBL564144
- CompTox Dashboard (EPA): DTXSID10468930

Chemical and physical data
- Formula: C_{19}H_{22}N_{2}S
- Molar mass: 310.46 g·mol^{−1}
- 3D model (JSmol): Interactive image
- SMILES: C[C@@H](C1=CC=CC=N1)C2=C(SC3=CC=CC=C32)CCN(C)C
- InChI: InChI=1S/C19H22N2S/c1-14(16-9-6-7-12-20-16)19-15-8-4-5-10-17(15)22-18(19)11-13-21(2)3/h4-10,12,14H,11,13H2,1-3H3/t14-/m0/s1; Key:NANQRVOKMXDMNL-AWEZNQCLSA-N

NBI-75043 is a potent and highly selective histamine H_{1} receptor antagonist or antihistamine which was under development for the treatment of insomnia but was never marketed. It is taken orally. The drug has been found to enhance both slow wave sleep and REM sleep in rodents. Its elimination half-life was found to be 6.7 hours orally and 9.1 hours by intravenous injection in a clinical study. For comparison, diphenhydramine had a half-life of 12 hours and 9.3 hours by these respective routes in the same study. The chemical synthesis of NBI-75043 has been described. NBI-75043 was under development by Neurocrine Biosciences. It entered phase 1 clinical trials for insomnia in 2006 and completed a phase 1 trial the same year. No further development was reported after that and its development was eventually discontinued. Studies of NBI-75043 were published in 2009.

== See also ==
- List of investigational insomnia drugs
