= Diphenhydramine/lorazepam/zolpidem =

Combination of
- Diphenhydramine: Antihistamine (histamine H_{1} receptor antagonist) and anticholinergic (muscarinic acetylcholine receptor antagonist)
- Lorazepam: Benzodiazepine (GABA_{A} receptor positive allosteric modulator)
- Zolpidem: Z drug/nonbenzodiazepine (GABA_{A} receptor positive allosteric modulator)

Clinical data
- Other names: SM-1; SM1
- Routes of administration: Oral

Diphenhydramine/lorazepam/zolpidem (developmental code name SM-1) is a combination of the antihistamine and anticholinergic diphenhydramine, the benzodiazepine lorazepam, and the Z drug/nonbenzodiazepine zolpidem which is or was under development for the treatment of insomnia. It is taken orally. Both lorazepam and zolpidem are GABA_{A} receptor positive allosteric modulators. The combination was originated by Sequential Medicine and is under development by Eusol Biotech. As of October 2024, it is in phase 3 clinical trials for insomnia. However, another source lists the drug as having been discontinued.

== See also ==
- List of investigational insomnia drugs
