= Vornorexant =

Chemical compound

Clinical data
- Trade names: Vorzzz
- Other names: ORN-0829; ORN0829; TS-142; TS142
- Routes of administration: Oral
- Drug class: Orexin receptor antagonist; Orexin OX_{1} and OX_{2} receptor antagonist; Hypnotic
- ATC code: None

Pharmacokinetic data
- Protein binding: 94.5–96.3%
- Metabolism: CYP3A4
- Elimination half-life: 1.3–3.3 hours

Identifiers
- IUPAC name: [(2S)-2-[[3-(5-fluoropyridin-2-yl)pyrazol-1-yl]methyl]-1,3-oxazinan-3-yl]-[5-methyl-2-(triazol-2-yl)phenyl]methanone
- CAS Number: 2265899-49-6
- PubChem CID: 137419776
- ChemSpider: 61751857
- UNII: ZY54BP1CK3
- KEGG: D12611

Chemical and physical data
- Formula: C_{23}H_{22}FN_{7}O_{2}
- Molar mass: 447.474 g·mol^{−1}
- 3D model (JSmol): Interactive image
- SMILES: CC1=CC(=C(C=C1)N2N=CC=N2)C(=O)N3CCCO[C@H]3CN4C=CC(=N4)C5=NC=C(C=C5)F
- InChI: InChI=1S/C23H22FN7O2/c1-16-3-6-21(31-26-8-9-27-31)18(13-16)23(32)30-10-2-12-33-22(30)15-29-11-7-20(28-29)19-5-4-17(24)14-25-19/h3-9,11,13-14,22H,2,10,12,15H2,1H3/t22-/m0/s1; Key:AEZZJXJIJFSUEM-QFIPXVFZSA-N

Vornorexant, sold under the brand name Vorzzz, is an orexin receptor antagonist which is used in the treatment of insomnia in Japan. It is taken orally. The drug is available for insomnia in the form of 2.5, 5, and 10 mg oral tablets. It has been found to improve sleep onset, sleep maintenance, and daytime functioning with both short-term and long-term use.

Side effects of vornorexant include somnolence among others. It does not appear to impair next-day functioning or driving performance, which suggests that it causes minimal next-day or residual effects. The drug also does not appear to cause dependence, withdrawal, rebound insomnia, or suicidality. Vornorexant acts as a dual orexin OX_{1} and OX_{2} receptor antagonist (DORA). It has a time to peak of 2.5 hours and a relatively short elimination half-life of 1.3 to 3.3 hours. Vornorexant was designed to have a short half-life and duration in order to reduce next-day side effects like somnolence.

Vornorexant was first described in the scientific literature by 2020. It was developed by Taisho Pharmaceutical in Japan. The drug was approved for the treatment of insomnia in Japan in August 2025. It was also under development for the treatment of sleep apnea syndrome, but no recent development for this indication has been reported. Vornorexant is not a controlled substance in Japan.

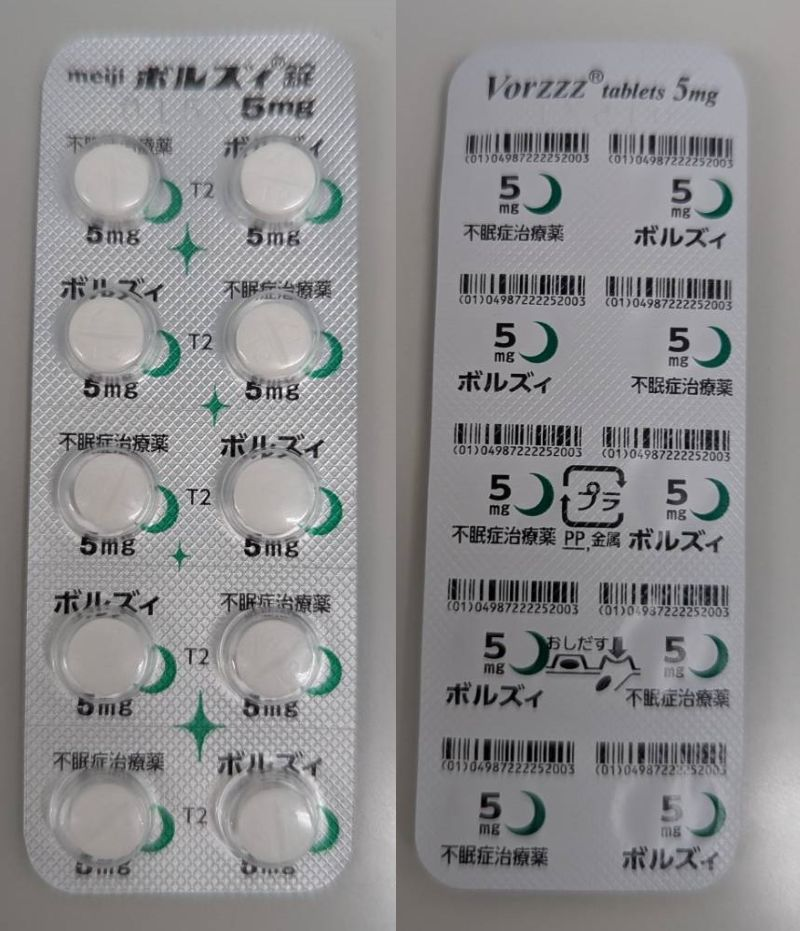
Vornorexant (Vorzzz) blister pack sold in Japan.
