= Dimdazenil =

Chemical compound

Clinical data
- Trade names: Junoenil
- Other names: EVT-201; EVT201
- ATC code: N05CD16 (WHO)

Legal status
- Legal status: Rx in China

Identifiers
- IUPAC name: 7-Chloro-3-[5-[(dimethylamino)methyl]-1,2,4-oxadiazol-3-yl]-5-methyl-4H-imidazo[1,5-a][1,4]benzodiazepin-6-one
- CAS Number: 308239-86-3
- PubChem CID: 9885841
- DrugBank: DB05721
- ChemSpider: 8061514
- UNII: 6J8AF7CLE4
- KEGG: D13231
- ChEMBL: ChEMBL5095096
- CompTox Dashboard (EPA): DTXSID301032055

Chemical and physical data
- Formula: C_{17}H_{17}ClN_{6}O_{2}
- Molar mass: 372.81 g·mol^{−1}
- 3D model (JSmol): Interactive image
- SMILES: Clc4cccc3n2cnc(c1nc(on1)CN(C)C)c2CN(C(=O)c34)C
- InChI: InChI=1S/C17H17ClN6O2/c1-22(2)8-13-20-16(21-26-13)15-12-7-23(3)17(25)14-10(18)5-4-6-11(14)24(12)9-19-15/h4-6,9H,7-8H2,1-3H3; Key:JCYLWUVDHLVGER-UHFFFAOYSA-N

Dimdazenil, sold under the brand name Junoenil, is a medication used in the treatment of insomnia in China. It is a benzodiazepine derivative and a partial positive allosteric modulator of the GABA_{A} receptor with two- to four-fold higher functional affinity for the α_{1} subunit relative to the α_{2}, α_{3}, and α_{5} subunits.

== Medical use ==
Dimdazenil shows effectiveness in the treatment of insomnia, but has less intrinsic activity in comparison to currently-marketed benzodiazepines and the Z-drugs; however, it is thought that the lower efficacy may result in fewer side effects, such as motor incoordination. In China, dimdazenil is approved for short-term treatment of insomnia.

== History ==
Dimdazenil was originally developed by Roche, based on preclinical data, as a non-sedating anxiolytic, but was found to produce sedation in humans in phase I clinical trials. For this reason, it was subsequently licensed to Evotec, which is now developing it for the treatment of insomnia. By 2007, dimdazenil completed phase II clinical trials for this indication, with positive findings reported. In China, the drug was developed by Zhejiang Jingxin Pharmaceutical.
