= Sleep efficiency =

Measurement of sleep duration

Sleep efficiency (SE) is the ratio between the time a person spends asleep, and the total time dedicated to sleep (i.e. both sleeping and attempting to fall asleep or fall back asleep). It is given as a percentage. SE of 80% or more is considered normal/healthy with most young healthy adults displaying SE above 90%. SE can be determined with a polysomnograph and is an important parameter of a sleep study.

Sleep efficiency is often described as the ratio between time spent asleep ("total sleep time (TST)"), and time spent "in bed" ("time in bed (TIB)"), however, TIB does not encompass "non-sleep-related activities" performed in bed (e.g. reading, watching television, etc.) as the phrase may seem to suggest.

Sleep efficiency plays a big role in insomnia research, since it shows the amount of time people are in bed for versus how much sleep they get. People with insomnia often spend lots of time in bed but get little sleep. This can often increase stress and make the problem worse. Improving sleep efficiency is often a way to measure whether insomnia treatments are working.

== Clinical significance ==
Long sleep duration may be a sign of low sleep efficiency. SE is significantly reduced in insomnia; SE is therefore an important clinical parameter in clinical investigations of insomnia. SE declines with age and low SE is common in the elderly. Furthermore, lower values of SE are often observed in sleep studies on pregnant populations and are mostly explained by the increased awakening periods after sleep onset (''wake after sleep onset (WASO)'').
