= Hypocretin (orexin) receptor 1 =

Protein found in humans

HCRTR1

Identifiers
- Aliases: HCRTR1, OX1R, Hypocretin (orexin) receptor 1, hypocretin receptor 1, ORXR1, OXR1
- External IDs: OMIM: 602392; MGI: 2385650; GeneCards: HCRTR1
Available structures
PDB	Ortholog search: PDBe RCSB
PDB	List of PDB id codes 4ZJ8, 4ZJC

Gene location (Human)
Chr.	Chromosome 1 (human)
Band	1p35.2	Start	31,617,686 bp
Band	1p35.2	End	31,632,518 bp

Gene location (Mouse)
Chr.	Chromosome 4 (mouse)
Band	4|4 D2.2	Start	130,024,010 bp
Band	4|4 D2.2	End	130,033,152 bp
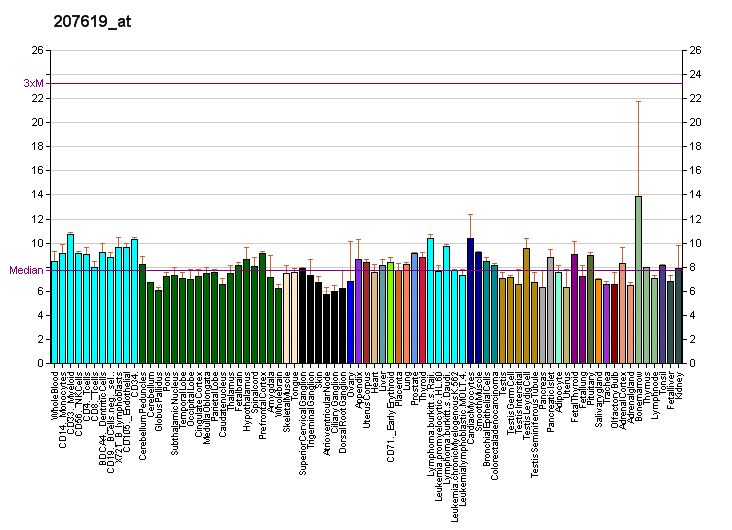
RNA expression pattern
Bgee	Human / Mouse (ortholog); Top expressed in: apex of heart; primary visual cortex; superior frontal gyrus; right lobe of thyroid gland; placenta; prefrontal cortex; left lobe of thyroid gland; left ventricle; skeletal muscle tissue; hypothalamus / Top expressed in: substantia nigra; spinal ganglia; embryo; blastocyst; central gray substance of midbrain; dentate gyrus of hippocampal formation granule cell; granulocyte; visual cortex; primary visual cortex; dorsal tegmental nucleus; More reference expression data
BioGPS	More reference expression data
Gene ontology
Molecular function	peptide hormone binding; peptide binding; G protein-coupled receptor activity; signal transducer activity; orexin receptor activity
Cellular component	integral component of membrane; plasma membrane; membrane; integral component of plasma membrane
Biological process	cellular response to hormone stimulus; regulation of circadian sleep/wake cycle, sleep; signal transduction; response to peptide; chemical synaptic transmission; regulation of cytosolic calcium ion concentration; positive regulation of ERK1 and ERK2 cascade; neuropeptide signaling pathway; feeding behavior; G protein-coupled receptor signaling pathway
Sources:Amigo / QuickGO
Orthologs
Databases	NCBI: entry; OMA: entry
Species	Human	Mouse
Entrez	3061	230777
Ensembl	ENSG00000121764	ENSMUSG00000028778
UniProt	O43613	P58307
RefSeq (mRNA)	NM_001525	NM_001163027; NM_198959; NM_001305392; NM_001357258
RefSeq (protein)	NP_001516	NP_001156499; NP_001292321; NP_945197; NP_001344187
Location (UCSC)	Chr 1: 31.62 – 31.63 Mb	Chr 4: 130.02 – 130.03 Mb
PubMed search
- Wikidata
View/Edit Human	View/Edit Mouse

Orexin receptor type 1 (Ox1R or OX_{1}), also known as hypocretin receptor type 1 (HcrtR1), is a protein that in humans is encoded by the HCRTR1 gene.

== Function ==
The orexin 1 receptor (OX_{1}), is a G-protein coupled receptor that is heavily expressed in projections from the lateral hypothalamus and is involved in the regulation of feeding behaviour. OX_{1} selectively binds the orexin-A neuropeptide. It shares 64% identity with OX_{2}.

== Ligands ==
=== Agonists ===
- Orexin-A

=== Antagonists ===
- ACT-335827 – selective OX_{1} antagonist
- Almorexant – dual OX_{1} and OX_{2} antagonist
- Lemborexant – dual OX_{1} and OX_{2} antagonist
- Nemorexant – dual OX_{1} and OX_{2} antagonist
- Rocavorexant (C4X-3256; INDV-2000) – selective OX_{1} receptor antagonist
- RTIOX-276 – selective OX_{1} antagonist
- SB-334,867 – selective OX_{1} antagonist
- SB-408,124 – selective OX_{1} antagonist
- SB-649,868 – dual OX_{1} and OX_{2} antagonist
- Suvorexant – dual OX_{1} and OX_{2} antagonist

== See also ==
- Orexin receptor
