= List of phenyltropanes =

Phenyltropanes (PTs) are a family of chemical compounds originally derived from structural modification of cocaine. The main feature differentiating phenyltropanes from cocaine is that they lack the ester functionality at the 3-position terminating in the benzene; thus, the phenyl is attached direct to the tropane skeleton (hence the name "phenyl"-tropane) with no further spacer that the cocaine benzoyloxy provided. The original purpose of phenyltropane-related research was to extirpate the cardiotoxicity inherent in the local anesthetic "numbing" capability of cocaine (which stems from the methylated benzoate ester being essential to cocaine's blockage of sodium channels, and which causes topical anesthesia) while retaining stimulant function. (Note: ←Page #929 (5th page of article) § II)

Phenyltropane compounds present promising avenues of research into therapeutic applications, particularly in regard to addiction treatment. These compounds' uses vary depending on their construction and structure-activity relationship ranging from the treating of cocaine dependency to understanding the dopamine reward system in the human brain to treating Alzheimer's and Parkinson's diseases. (Since 2008 there have been continual additions to the list and enumerations of the plethora of types of chemicals that fall into the category of this substance profile.) Certain phenyltropanes can even be used as a smoking cessation aid (cf. RTI-29). Many of the compounds were first elucidated in published material by the Research Triangle Institute and are thus named with "RTI" serial-numbers (in this case the long form is either RTI-COC-n, for 'cocaine' "analog", or specifically RTI-4229-n of the subsequent numbers given below in this article) (Note: Many of the RTI phenyltropanes are "RTI-4229-×××" where × is the specific phenyltropane code number. — e.g. RTI-55 is in-fact RTI-4229-55 but given below as simply RTI-55 for the sake of simplicity in shorthand (following as is done in the literature itself) as the subject matter in context is wholly within the scope of the phenyltropane coded category herein. Sometimes (more rarely) it is given as RTI-COC-××× for "cocaine derivative." — Worth mentioning in notation as to explain that other compounds entirely unrelated can be found with the same "RTI-×××" short-numbered assignation. Therefore it is to be expected that within different contexts a compound or chemical of the same name very possibly could be in reference to an entirely other substance of another chemical series non-analogous to those in this topic.) Similarly, a number of others are named for Sterling-Winthrop pharmaceuticals ("WIN" serial-numbers) and Wake Forest University ("WF" serial-numbers). The following includes many of the phenyltropane class of drugs that have been made and studied.

3D rendering of troparil; which comprises a privileged scaffold of among the phenyltropane class of compounds.

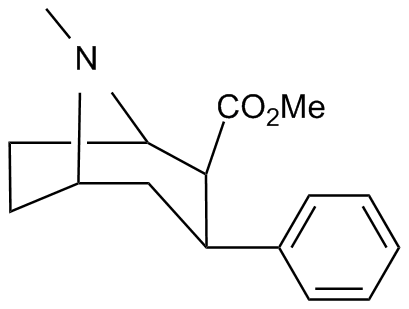
Troparil structure: cf. U.S. patent 5,496,953

== 2-Carboxymethyl esters (phenyl-methylecgonines) ==
Epibatropane containing a nitrogen heteroatom in the benzene ring formation.

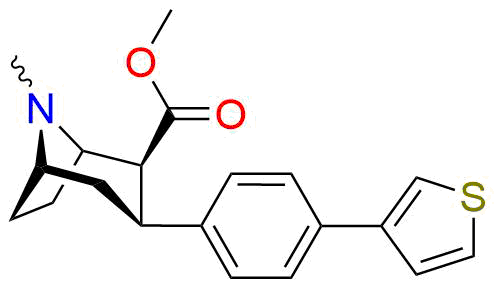
Tamagnan: SSRI, SERT = 17(pM) = 10 times the strength of paroxetine for 5HT.

RTI-298

(4′-)para-cis-propenyl-phenyl-methylecgonine. A rare SDRI compound with negligible NET affinity (>2,800.0nM displacement value for NET ligand) that retains significant DAT & SERT (15.0nM & 7.1nM) affinity.

C2-C3 unsaturated (non-isomeric, neither α nor β orientated) 2-naphthyl-tropane

1-naphthyl-tropane in its usual (comparably non-standard) boat formation of its tropane ring.

Like cocaine, phenyltropanes are considered a 'typical' or 'classical' (i.e. "cocaine-like") DAT re-uptake pump ligands in that they stabilize an "open-to-out" conformation on the dopamine transporter; despite the extreme similarity to phenyltropanes, benztropine and others are in suchwise not considered "cocaine-like" and are instead considered atypical inhibitors insofar as they stabilize what is considered a more inward-facing (closed-to-out) conformational state.

Considering the differences between PTs and cocaine: the difference in the length of the benzoyloxy and the phenyl linkage contrasted between cocaine and phenyltropanes makes for a shorter distance between the centroid of the aromatic benzene and the bridge nitrogen of the tropane in the latter PTs. This distance being on a scale of 5.6 Å for phenyltropanes and 7.7 Å for cocaine or analogs with the benzoyloxy intact. (Note: ←Page #970 (46th page of article) §B, 10th line) The manner in which this sets phenyltropanes into the binding pocket at MAT is postulated as one possible explanation to account for PTs increased behavioral stimulation profile over cocaine. (Note: ←Page #971 (47th page of article) 1st ¶, 10th line)

Blank spacings within tables for omitted data use "no data", "?", "-" or "—" interchangeably.

2β-carbmethoxy-3β-(4′-substituted phenyl)tropanes (IC_{50} values) monohalogen halide-phenyltropanes (11a—11e) alkyl-, & alkenyl-phenyltropanes (11r—11x) alkynyl-phenyltropanes (11y & 11z)
Structure	Short Name i.e. Trivial IUPAC (non-systematic) Name (Singh's #)	R (para-substitution) of benzene	DA [^{3}H]WIN 35428 IC_{50} nM (K_{i} nM)	5HT [^{3}H]paroxetine IC_{50} nM (K_{i} nM)	NE [^{3}H]nisoxetine IC_{50} nM (K_{i} nM)	selectivity 5-HTT/DAT	selectivity NET/DAT
	cocaine (benzoyloxytropane)	H	102 ± 12; 241 ± 18^{ɑ}	1045 ± 89; 112 ± 2^{b}	3298 ± 293; 160 ± 15^{c}	10.2; 0.5^{d}	32.3; 0.7^{e}
	(para-hydrogen)phenyltropane WIN 35,065-2 (β-CPT (Note: Beta (i.e. 2,3 Rectus)-Carbmethoxy-Phenyl-Tropane)) Troparil; 11a	H	23 ± 5.0; 49.8 ± 2.2^{ɑ}	1962 ± 61; 173 ± 13^{b}	920 ± 73; 37.2 ± 5.2^{c}	85.3; 3.5^{d}	40.0; 0.7^{e}
	para-fluorophenyltropane WIN 35,428 (β-CFT (Note: Beta (i.e. 2,3 Rectus)-Carbmethoxy-Fluorophenyl-Tropane)); 11b	F	14 (15.7 ± 1.4); 22.9 ± 0.4^{ɑ}	156 (810 ± 59); 100 ± 13^{b}	85 (835 ± 45); 38.6 ± 9.9^{c}	51.6; 4.4^{d}	53.2; 1.7^{e}
	para-nitrophenyltropane 11k	NO_{2}	10.1 ± 0.10	?	?	?	?
	para-aminophenyltropane RTI-29; 11j	NH_{2}	9.8; 24.8 ± 1.3^{g}	5110	151	521.4	15.4
	para-chlorophenyltropane RTI-31; 11c	Cl	1.12 ± 0.06; 3.68 ± 0.09^{ɑ}	44.5 ± 1.3; 5.00 ± 0.05^{b}	37 ± 2.1; 5.86 ± 0.67^{c}	39.7; 1.3^{d}	33.0; 1.7^{e}
	para-methylphenyltropane RTI-32 Tolpane; 11f	Me	1.71 ± 0.30; 7.02 ± 0.30^{ɑ}	240 ± 27; 19.38 ± 0.65^{b}	60 ± 0.53^{e} 8.42 ± 1.53^{c}	140; 2.8^{d}	35.1; 1.2^{e}
	para-bromophenyltropane RTI-51 Bromopane; 11d	Br	1.81 (1.69) ± 0.30	10.6 ± 0.24	37.4 ± 5.2	5.8	20.7
	para-iodophenyltropane RTI-55 (β-CIT) Iometopane; 11e	I	1.26 ± 0.04; 1.96 ± 0.09^{ɑ}	4.21 ± 0.3; 1.74 ± 0.23^{b}	36 ± 2.7; 7.51 ± 0.82^{c}	3.3; 0.9^{d}	28.6; 3.8^{e}
	para-hydroxyphenyltropane 11h	OH	12.1 ± 0.86	—	—	—	—
	para-methoxyphenyltropane 11i	OCH_{3}	8.14 ± 1.3	—	—	—	—
	para-azidophenyltropane 11l	N_{3}	2.12 ± 0.13	—	—	—	—
	para-trifluoromethylphenyltropane 11m	CF_{3}	13.1 ± 2.2	—	—	—	—
	para-acetylaminophenyltropane 11n	NHCOCH_{3}	64.2 ± 2.6	—	—	—	—
	para-propionylaminophenyltropane 11o	NHCOC_{2}H_{5}	121 ± 2.7	—	—	—	—
	para-ethoxycarbonylaminophenyltropane 11p	NHCO_{2}C_{3}H_{5}	316 ± 48	—	—	—	—
	para-trimethylstannylphenyltropane 11q	Sn(CH_{3})_{3}	144 ± 37	—	—	—	—
	para-ethylphenyltropane RTI-83; 11g	Et	55 ± 2.1	28.4 ± 3.8 (2.58 ± 3.5)	4030 (3910) ± 381 (2360 ± 230)	0.5	73.3
	para-n-propylphenyltropane RTI-282^{i} 11r	n-C_{3}H_{7}	68.5 ± 7.1	70.4 ± 4.1	3920 ± 130	1.0	57.2
	para-isopropylphenyltropane 11s	CH(CH_{3})_{2}	597 ± 52	191 ± 9.5	75000 ± 5820	0.3	126
	para-vinylphenyltropane RTI-359; 11t	CH-CH_{2}	1.24 ± 0.2	9.5 ± 0.8	78 ± 4.1	7.7	62.9
	para-methylethenylphenyltropane RTI-283^{j} 11u	C(=CH_{2})CH_{3}	14.4 ± 0.3	3.13 ± 0.16	1330 ± 333	0.2	92.4
	para-trans-propenylphenyltropane RTI-296^{i} 11v	trans-CH=CHCH_{3}	5.29 ± 0.53	11.4 ± 0.28	1590 ± 93	2.1	300
	para-allylphenyltropane 11x	CH_{2}CH=CH_{2}	32.8 ± 3.1	28.4 ± 2.4	2480 ± 229	0.9	75.6
	para-ethynylphenyltropane RTI-360; 11y	C≡CH	1.2 ± 0.1	4.4 ± 0.4	83.2 ± 2.8	3.7	69.3
	para-propynylphenyltropane RTI-281^{i} 11z	C≡CCH_{3}	2.37 ± 0.2	15.7 ± 1.5	820 ± 46	6.6	346
	para-cis-propenylphenyltropane RTI-304; 11w	cis-CH=CHCH_{3}	15 ± 1.2	7.1 ± 0.71	2,800^{k} ± 300	0.5	186.6^{k}
	para-(Z)-phenylethenylphenyltropane	cis-CH=CHPh	11.7 ± 1.12	—	—	—	—
	para-benzylphenyltropane	-CH_{2}-Ph	526 ± 65	7,240 ± 390 (658 ± 35)	6670 ± 377 (606 ± 277)	13.7	12.6
	para-phenylethenylphenyltropane	CH_{2} ║ -C-Ph	474 ± 133	2,710 ± 800 (246 ± 73)	7,060 ± 1,760 (4,260 ± 1,060)	5.7	14.8
	para-phenylethylphenyltropane^{l}	-(CH_{2})_{2}-Ph	5.14 ± 0.63	234 ± 26 (21.3 ± 2.4)	10.8 ± 0.3 (6.50 ± 0.20)	45.5	2.1
	para-(E)-phenylethenylphenyltropane^{l} RTI-436	trans–CH=CHPh	3.09 ± 0.75	335 ± 150 (30.5 ± 13.6)	1960 ± 383 (1180 ± 231)	108.4	634.3
	para-phenylpropylphenyltropane^{l}	-(CH_{2})_{3}-Ph	351 ± 52	1,243 ± 381 (113 ± 35)	14,200 ± 1,800 (8,500 ± 1,100)	3.5	40.4
	para-phenylpropenylphenyltropane^{l}	-CH=CH-CH_{2}-Ph	15.8 ± 1.31	781 ± 258 (71 ± 24)	1,250 ± 100 (759 ± 60)	49.4	79.1
	para-phenylbutylphenyltropane^{l}	-(CH_{2})_{4}-Ph	228 ± 21	4,824 ± 170 (439 ± 16)	2,310 ± 293 (1,390 ± 177)	21.1	10.1
	para-phenylethynylphenyltropane^{l} RTI-298	–≡–Ph	3.7 ± 0.16	46.8 ± 5.8 (4.3 ± 0.53)	347 ± 25 (209 ± 15)	12.6	93.7
	para-phenylpropynylphenyltropane^{l}	–C≡C-CH_{2}Ph	1.82 ± 0.42	13.1 ± 1.7 (1.19 ± 0.42)	27.4 ± 2.6 (16.5 ± 1.6)	7.1	15
	para-phenylbutynylphenyltropane^{l} RTI-430	–C≡C(CH_{2})_{2}Ph	6.28 ± 1.25	2180 ± 345 (198 ± 31)	1470 ± 109 (885 ± 66)	347.1	234
	para-phenylpentynylphenyltropane^{l}	–C≡C-(CH_{2})_{3}-Ph	300 ± 37	1,340 ± 232 (122 ± 21)	4,450 ± 637 (2,680 ± 384)	4.46	14.8
	para-trimethylsilylethynylphenyltropane	—	—	—	—	—	—
	para-hydroxypropynylphenyltropane	—	—	—	—	—	—
	para-hydroxyhexynylphenyltropane^{l}	–C≡C-(CH_{2})_{4}OH	57 ± 4	828 ± 29 (75 ± 2.6)	9,500 ± 812 (5,720 ± 489)	14.5	166.6
	para-(thiophen-3-yl)phenyltropane Tamagnan	p-thiophene	12	0.017	189	0.001416	15.7
	para-biphenyltropane 11aa	Ph	10.3 ± 2.6^{f} 29.4 ± 3.8^{ɑ} 15.6 ± 0.6	95.8 ± 36 (8.7 ± 3.3)	1,480 ± 269 (892 ± 162)	6.1	94.8
	3β-2-naphthyltropane RTI-318; 11bb	3β-2-naphthyl	0.51 ± 0.03; 3.32 ± 0.08^{f} 3.53 ± 0.09^{ɑ}	0.80 ± 0.06 (0.07 ± 0.1)	21.1 ± 1.0 (12.7 ± 0.60)	1.5	41.3
	para-bimethoxyphenyltropane 15	OCH_{2}OCH_{3}^{h}	—	—	—	—	—

- ^{ɑ}[^{3}H]DA uptake displacement K_{i} value.
- ^{b}[^{3}H]5-HT uptake displacement K_{i} value.
- ^{c}[^{3}H]NE uptake displacement K_{i} value.
- ^{d}[^{3}H]5-HT uptake to [^{3}H]DA uptake ratio.
- ^{e}[^{3}H]NE uptake to [^{3}H]DA uptake ratio.
- ^{f}IC_{50} for displacement of [^{3}H]cocaine.
- ^{g}Values from alternate data-set differing from that used in rest of table.
- ^{h}Original source (Scheme 4, page 931, 7th of article) name given for compound (bottom of first ¶) is at variance with formula in scheme on same page: i.e. "methoxymethyl" versus "methoxymethoxy"
- ^{i}Protonated as the (-)—tartrate salt (isomer)
- ^{j}Protonated as the tartrate salt
- ^{k}Was cited by S. Singh as 28,000nM for SERT or a DAT/SERT ratio of 1,867. However, in Singh's paper he cited J. Med. Chem. 1996, 39, 4030, Table 1 which shows a ten times lower value, which is consistent with numerous RTI patents published showing the ten-× lower value.
- ^{l}Whereas many bulky additions to the arene unit of phenyltropanes hinder and impair affinity, it has been observed that the para-substituted rigid triple bond analogs terminating in a second phenyl (off of the initial C3 position phenyl) have a high-binding affinity, putatively attesting to the existence of another binding domain that extends beyond the usual ending point where the benzene accords to the acceptor somewhere along the length of range inhabited by the DAT, corresponding to a 180° extension outward from the para area of the aryl of these types of ligands.

=== (4′-Monosubstituted 2,3-Thiophene phenyl)-tropanes ===
Tamagnan (thiophene) analogues of para-phenyltropanes.
Compound structure	Alphanumeric code (name)	para-substitution	N8	SERT	DAT	NET	Selectivity SERT versus DAT	Selectivity SERT versus NET
	1 (cocaine)	(—)-Cocaine	CH_{3}	1050	89	3320	0.08	3.2
	2 (β-CIT), (Iometopane)	Iodo	CH_{3}	0.46 ± 0.06	0.96 ± 0.15	2.80 ± 0.40	2.1	6.1
	(R,S-Citalopram)	—	—	1.60	16,540	6,190	10,338	3,869
	4a	2-Thiophene	CH_{3}	0.15 ± 0.015	52 ± 12.8	158 ± 12	346	1,053
	4b (Tamagnan)	3-Thiophene	CH_{3}	0.017 ± 0.004	12.1 ± 3	189 ± 82	710	11,118
	4c	2-(5-Br)-Thiophene	CH_{3}	0.38 ± 0.008	6.43 ± 0.9	324 ± 19	17	853
	4d	2-(5-Cl)-Thiophene	CH_{3}	0.64 ± 0.04	4.42 ± 1.64	311 ± 25	6.9	486
	4e	2-(5-I)-Thiophene	CH_{3}	4.56 ± 0.84	22.1 ± 3.2	1,137 ± 123	4.9	249
	4f	2-(5-NH_{2})-Thiophene	CH_{3}	64.7 ± 3.7	>10,000	>30,000	>155	>464
	4g	2-(4,5-NO_{2})-Thiophene	CH_{3}	5,000	>30,000	>10,000	>6.0	>2.0
	4h	3-(4-Br)-Thiophene	CH_{3}	4.02 ± 0.34	183 ± 69	>10,000	46	>2,488
	5a	2-Thiophene	H	0.11 ± 0.006	12.2 ± 0.9	75.3 ± 9.6	111	685
	5b	3-Thiophene	H	0.23 ± 0.02	6.4 ± 0.27	39 ± 0.8	28	170

=== (3′,4′-Disubstituted phenyl)-tropanes ===
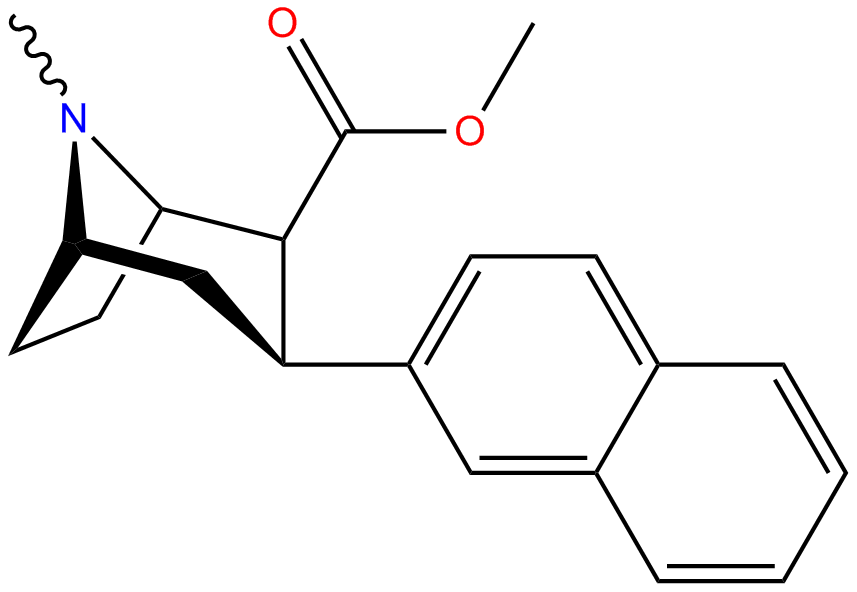

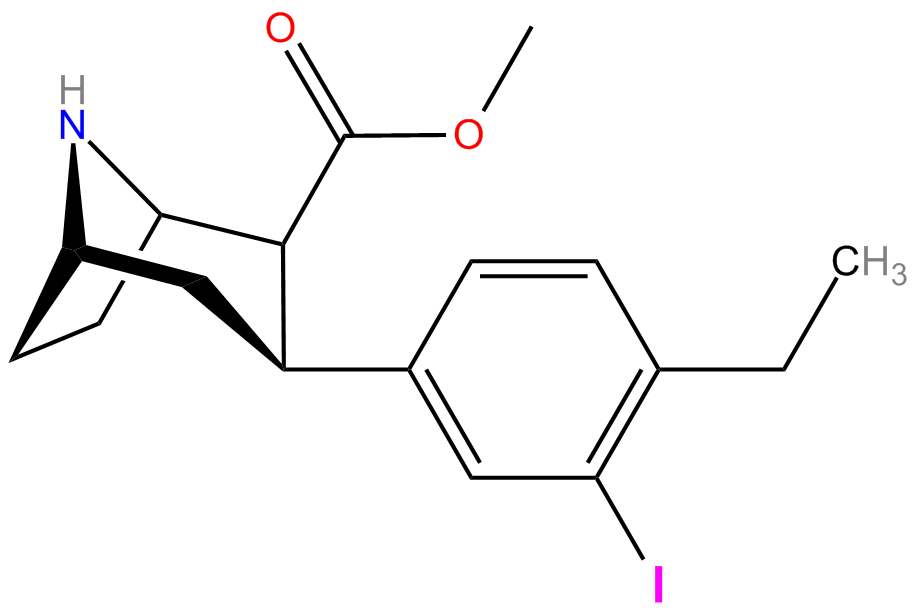

Compound (+ S. Singh's name)	X (4′-para)	Y (3′-meta)	2 Position	config	8	DA	5-HT	NE
RTI-318; 11bb	β-naphthyl		CO_{2}Me	β,β	NMe	0.5	0.81	20
Dichloropane (RTI-111^{ɑ}); 17c	Cl	Cl	CO_{2}Me	β,β	NMe	0.79	3.13	18.0
RTI-88 [recheck] 17e	NH_{2}	I	CO_{2}Me	β,β	NMe	1.35	1329^{c}	320^{c}
RTI-97; 17d	NH_{2}	Br	CO_{2}Me	β,β	NMe	3.91	181	282
RTI-112^{b} 17b	Cl	Me	CO_{2}Me	β,β	NMe	0.82	10.5	36.2
RTI-96; 17a	F	Me	CO_{2}Me	β,β	NMe	2.95	76	520
RTI-295	Et	I	CO_{2}Me	β,β	NMe	21.3	2.96	1349
RTI-353 (EINT)	Et	I	CO_{2}Me	β,β	NH	331	0.69	148
RTI-279	Me	I	CO_{2}Me	β,β	NH	5.98	1.06	74.3
RTI-280	Me	I	CO_{2}Me	β,β	NMe	3.12	6.81	484
Meltzer	catechol		CO_{2}Me	β,β	NMe	>100	?	?
Meltzer	OAc	OAc	CO_{2}Me	β,β	NMe	?	?	?

- ^{ɑ}as ·HCl (salt)
- ^{b}as ·HCl·2 H_{2}O (salt)
- ^{c}Singh gives the reverse value with respect to i.e. 1,329 for NET & 320 for 5-HT

Para-meta-substituted 2β-carbomethoxy-3α-(4′-substituted phenyl)tropanes
Compound	Short Name (S. Singh)	R^{2}	R^{1}	DA	5HT	NE	Selectivity 5-HTT/DAT	Selectivity NET/DAT
	meta-fluorophenyltropane 16a	F	H	23 ± 7.8	-	-	-	-
	meta-chlorophenyltropane 16b	Cl	H	10.6 ± 1.8	-	-	-	-
	meta-bromophenyltropane 16c	Br	H	7.93 ± 0.08^{ɑ}	-	-	-	-
	meta-iodophenyltropane 16d	I	H	26.1 ± 1.7	-	-	-	-
	meta-tributylstannylphenyltropane 16e	SnBu_{3}	H	1100 ± 170	-	-	-	-
	meta-ethynylphenyltropane	C≡CH	H	-	-	-	-	-
	meta-methyl-para-fluorophenyltropane RTI-96; 17a	CH_{3}	F	2.95 ± 0.58	-	-	-	-
	meta-methyl-para-chlorophenyltropane RTI-112^{c} 17b	CH_{3}	Cl	0.81 ± 0.05	10.5 ± 0.05	36.2 ± 1.0	13.0	44.7
	meta-para-dichlorophenyltropane RTI-111^{b} Dichloropane; 17c	Cl	Cl	0.79 ± 0.08^{b}	3.13 ± 0.36^{b}	18.0 ± 0.8; 17.96 ± 0.85^{'b'd}	4.0^{b}	22.8^{b}
	meta-bromo-para-aminophenyltropane RTI-97; 17d	Br	NH_{2}	3.91 ± 0.59	181	282	46.2	72.1
	meta-iodo-para-aminophenyltropane RTI-88; 17e	I	NH_{2}	1.35 ± 0.11	120 ± 4	1329 ± 124	88.9	984
	meta-iodo-para-azidophenyltropane 17f	I	N_{3}	4.93 ± 0.32	-	-	-	-

- ^{ɑ}IC_{50} determined in Cynomolgous monkey caudate-putamen
- ^{b}as ·HCl (salt)
- ^{c}as ·HCl·2 H_{2}O (salt)
- ^{d}NE_{N}

3β-(4-alkylthio, -methylsulfinyl, and -methylsulfonylphenyl)tropanes
Structure	Compound	R	X	_{n}	Inhibition of [^{3}H]WIN 35,428 @ DAT IC_{50} (nM)	Inhibition of [^{3}H]Paroxetine @ 5-HTT K_{i} (nM)	Inhibition of [^{3}H]Nisoxetine @ NET K_{i} (nM)	NET/DAT (uptake ratio)	NET/5-HTT (uptake ratio)
	Cocaine	Des-thio/sulfinyl/sulfonyl; H	H	Desmethyl; 0	89.1	95	1990	22	21
	para-methoxyphenyltropane Singh: 11i	Des-thio/sulfinyl/sulfonyl; OCH_{3}	H	0	6.5 ± 1.3	4.3 ± 0.5	1110 ± 64	171	258
	7a	CH_{3}	H	0	9 ± 3	0.7 ± 0.2	220 ± 10	24	314
	7b	C_{2}H_{5}	H	0	232 ± 34	4.5 ± 0.5	1170 ± 300	5	260
	7c	CH(CH_{3})_{2}	H	0	16 ± 2	23 ± 2	129 ± 2	8	7
	7d	CF_{3}	H	0	200 ± 70	8 ± 2	1900 ± 300	10	238
	7e	CH_{3}	Br	0	10.1 ± 1	0.6 ± 0.2	121 ± 12	12	202
	7f	CH_{3}	Br	1	76 ± 18	3.2 ± 0.4	690 ± 80	9	216
	7g	CH_{3}	H	1	91 ± 16	4.3 ± 0.6	515 ± 60	6	120
	7h	CH_{3}	H	2	>10,000	208 ± 45	>10,000	1	48

=== (2′,4′-Disubstituted phenyl)-tropanes ===
Ortho-para-substituted (2′,4′-disubstituted phenyltropanes)
Compound structure	Trivial IUPAC (non-systematic) Name	R^{2} ortho	R^{1} para	DA	5HT	NE	Selectivity 5-HTT/DAT	Selectivity NET/DAT
	ortho,para-dinitrophenyltropane	NO_{2}	NO_{2}	-	-	-	-	-

=== (3′,4′,5′-Trisubstituted para-methoxyphenyl)-tropanes ===
Para-meta(3′)-meta(5′)-(di-meta)-substituted 2β-carbomethoxy-(3′,4′,5′-substituted phenyl)tropanes Para-methoxy/(ethoxy)-meta-substituted phenyltropanes
Structure	Short Name (All compounds tested as HCl salts)	R^{2} 3′-(meta)	R^{3} 5′-(di-meta)	OR^{1} 4′-(para)	DAT IC_{50} [^{3}H](compound #)12	5-HTT K_{i} [^{3}H]Paroxetine	NET K_{i} [^{3}H]Nisoxetine	Selectivity NET/DAT Ratio K_{i}/IC_{50}	Selectivity NET/5-HTT Ratio K_{i}/K_{i}
	Cocaine	-	-	-	89.1	95	1990	22	21
	6 RTI-112	-	-	-	0.82 ± 0.05	0.95 ± 0.04	21.8 ± 0.6	27	23
	7a 11i	H	H	CH_{3}	6.5 ± 1.3	4.3 ± 0.5	1110 ± 64	171	258
	7b	H	H	C_{2}H_{5}	92 ± 8	1.7 ± 0.4	1690 ± 50	18	994
	7c	F	H	CH_{3}	16 ± 1	4.8 ± 0.5	270 ± 50	17	56
	7d	Br	H	CH_{3}	47 ± 15	3.1 ± 0.1	160 ± 20	3	52
	7f	Br	Br	CH_{3}	92 ± 22	2.9 ± 0.1	4100 ± 400^{ɑ}	45	1413
	7e	I	H	CH_{3}	170 ± 60	3.5 ± 0.4	180 ± 20	1	51
	7g	I	I	CH_{3}	1300 ± 200	7.5 ± 0.8	180 ± 20	4	667

^{ɑ}N=2

=== (2′,4′,5′-Trisubstituted phenyl)-tropanes ===
Ortho-para(4′)-meta(5′)-trisubstituted 2β-carbomethoxy-(2′,4′,5′-substituted phenyl)tropanes
Structure	Short Name	R^{1} 2′-(ortho)	R^{2} 4′-(para)	R^{3} 5′-(meta)	DAT	5-HTT	NET	Selectivity NET/DAT Ratio	Selectivity NET/5-HTT Ratio
	para-ethyl-ortho, meta-diiodophenyltropane	iodo	ethyl	iodo	—	—	—	—	—

== 2-Carbmethoxy modified (replaced/substituted) ==
=== General 2-carbmethoxy modifications ===
==== 2β-substitutions of p-methoxy-phenyltropanes ====
Para-OCH_{3}-(3β-(4-Methoxyphenyl)tropane-2β-carboxylic acid ester analogues
Structure	Short Name (All compounds tested as HCl salts)	CO_{2}R (2β-substituted) (compound 9 is 2β=R)	DAT IC_{50} [^{3}H](compound #)12	5-HTT K_{i} [^{3}H]Paroxetine	NET K_{i} [^{3}H]Nisoxetine	Selectivity NET/DAT Ratio K_{i}/IC_{50}	Selectivity NET/5-HTT Ratio K_{i}/K_{i}
	7a 11i	CH_{3}	6.5 ± 1.3	4.3 ± 0.5	1110 ± 64	171	258
	8a	(CH_{3})_{2}CH	14 ± 3	135 ± 35	2010 ± 200	144	15
	8b	cyclopropane	6.0 ± 2	29 ± 3	1230 ± 140	205	42
	8c	cyclobutane	13 ± 3	100 ± 8	>3000	231	30
	8d	O_{2}N...1,4-xylene...(CH_{2})_{2}	42 ± 8	2.9 ± 0.2	330 ± 20	8	114
	8e	H_{2}N...1,4-xylene...(CH_{2})_{2}	7.0 ± 2	8.3 ± 0.4	2200 ± 300^{ɑ}	314	265
	8f	CH_{3}CONH...1,4-xylene...(CH_{2})_{2}	6.0 ± 1	5.5 ± 0.5	1460 ± 30	243	265
	8g	H_{2}N...2-bromo-1,4-dimethylbenzene...(CH_{2})_{2}	3.3 ± 1.4	4.1 ± 0.6	1850 ± 90	561	451
	8h	H_{2}N...1,3-dibromo-2,5-dimethylbenzene...(CH_{2})_{2}	15 ± 6	2.0 ± 0.4	2710 ± 250^{ɑ}	181	1360
	8i	H_{2}N...2-iodo-1,4-dimethylbenzene...(CH_{2})_{2}	2.5 ± 0.7	3.5 ± 1	2040 ± 300^{ɑ}	816	583
	8j	H_{2}N...1,3-diiodo-2,5-dimethylbenzene...(CH_{2})_{2}	102 ± 15	1.0 ± 0.1	2600 ± 200^{ɑ}	25	2600
	9	3-(4-methylphenyl)-1,2-oxazole	18 ± 6	860 ± 170	>3000	167	3

^{ɑ}N=2

==== 2β-carboxy side-chained (p-chloro/iodo/methyl) phenyltropanes ====
Multi-substituted structures of 2β-ester-3β-phenyltropanes
Compound	Short Name (S. Singh)	R	X	IC_{50} (nM) DAT [^{3}H]WIN 35428	IC_{50} (nM) 5-HTT [^{3}H]paroxetine	IC_{50} (nM) NET [^{3}H]nisoxetine	Selectivity 5-HTT/DAT	Selectivity NET/DAT
	23a	CH(CH_{3})_{2}	H	85.1 ± 2.5	23121 ± 3976	32047 ± 1491	272	376
	23b	C_{6}H_{5}	H	76.7 ± 3.6	106149 ± 7256	19262 ± 593	1384	251
	24a	CH(CH_{3})_{2}	Cl	1.4 ± 0.13; 6.04 ± 0.31^{ɑ}	1400 ± 7; 128 ± 15^{b}	778 ± 21; 250 ± 0.9^{c}	1000; 21.2^{d}	556; 41.4^{e}
	24b	cyclopropyl	Cl	0.96 ± 0.10	168 ± 1.8	235 ± 8.39	175	245
	24c	C_{6}H_{5}	Cl	1.99 ± 0.05; 5.25 ± 0.76^{ɑ}	2340 ± 27; 390 ± 34^{b}	2960 ± 220; 242 ± 30^{c}	1176; 74.3^{d}	1.3; 41.6^{e}
	24d	C_{6}H_{4}-4-I	Cl	32.6 ± 3.9	1227 ± 176	967.6 ± 26.3	37.6	29.7
	24e	C_{6}H_{4}-3-CH_{3}	Cl	9.37 ± 0.52	2153 ± 143	2744 ± 140	230	293
	24f	C_{6}H_{4}-4-CH_{3}	Cl	27.4 ± 1.5	1203 ± 42	1277 ± 118	43.9	46.6
	24g	C_{6}H_{4}-2-CH_{3}	Cl	3.91 ± 0.23	3772 ± 384	4783 ± 387	965	1223
	24h	C_{6}H_{4}-4-Cl	Cl	55 ± 2.3	16914 ± 1056	4883 ± 288	307	88.8
	24i	C_{6}H_{4}-4-OCH_{3}	Cl	71 ± 5.6	19689 ± 1843	1522 ± 94	277	21.4
	24j	(CH_{2})_{2}C_{6}H_{4}-4-NO_{2}	Cl	2.71 ± 0.13	-	-	-	-
	24k	(CH)_{2}C_{6}H_{4}-4-NH_{2}	Cl	2.16 ± 0.25	-	-	-	-
	24l	(CH_{2})_{2}C_{6}H_{3}-3-I-4-NH_{2}	Cl	2.51 ± 0.25	-	-	-	-
	24m	(CH_{2})_{2}C_{6}H_{3}-3-I-4-N_{3}	Cl	14.5 ± 0.94	-	-	-	-
	24n	(CH_{2})_{2}C_{6}H_{4}-4-N_{3}	Cl	6.17 ± 0.57	-	-	-	-
	24o	(CH_{2})_{2}C_{6}H_{4}-4-NCS	Cl	5.3 ± 0.6	-	-	-	-
	24p	(CH_{2})_{2}C_{6}H_{4}-4-NHCOCH_{2}Br	Cl	1.73 ± 0.06	-	-	-	-
	25a	CH(CH_{3})_{2}	I	0.43 ± 0.05; 2.79 ± 0.13^{ɑ}	66.8 ± 6.53; 12.5 ± 1.0^{b}	285 ± 7.6; 41.2 ± 3.0^{c}	155; 4.5^{d}	663; 14.8^{e}
	25b	cyclopropyl	I	0.61 ± 0.08	15.5 ± 0.72	102 ± 11	25.4	167
	25c	C_{6}H_{5}	I	1.51 ± 0.34; 6.85 ± 0.93^{ɑ}	184 ± 22; 51.6 ± 6.2^{b}	3791 ± 149; 32.7 ± 4.4^{c}	122; 7.5^{d}	2510; 4.8^{e}
	26a	CH(CH_{3})_{2}	CH_{3}	6.45 ± 0.85; 15.3 ± 2.08^{ɑ}	6090 ± 488; 917 ± 54^{b}	1926 ± 38; 73.4 ± 11.6^{c}	944; 59.9^{d}	299; 4.8^{e}
	26b	CH(C_{2}H_{5})_{2}	CH_{3}	19.1 ± 1	4499 ± 557	3444 ± 44	235	180
	26c	cyclopropyl	CH_{3}	17.8 ± 0.76	485 ± 21	2628 ± 252	27.2	148
	26d	cyclobutyl	CH_{3}	3.74 ± 0.52	2019 ± 133	4738 ± 322	540	1267
	26e	cyclopentyl	CH_{3}	1.68 ± 0.14	1066 ± 109	644 ± 28	634	383
	26f	C_{6}H_{5}	CH_{3}	3.27 ± 0.06; 9.13 ± 0.79^{ɑ}	24500 ± 1526; 1537 ± 101^{b}	5830 ± 370; 277 ± 23^{c}	7492; 168^{d}	1783; 30.3^{e}
	26g	C_{6}H_{4}-3-CH_{3}	CH_{3}	8.19 ± 0.90	5237 ± 453	2136 ± 208	639	261
	26h	C_{6}H_{4}-4-CH_{3}	CH_{3}	81.2 ± 16	15954 ± 614	4096 ± 121	196	50.4
	26i	C_{6}H_{4}-2-CH_{3}	CH_{3}	23.2 ± 0.97	11040 ± 504	25695 ± 1394	476	1107
	26j	C_{6}H_{4}-4-Cl	CH_{3}	117 ± 7.9	42761 ± 2399	9519 ± 864	365	81.3
	26k	C_{6}H_{4}-4-OCH_{3}	CH_{3}	95.6 ± 8.8	82316 ± 7852	3151 ± 282	861	33.0

- ^{ɑ}Ki value for displacement of [^{3}H]DA uptake.
- ^{b}Ki value for displacement of [^{3}H]5-HT uptake.
- ^{c}Ki value for displacement of [^{3}H]NE uptake.
- ^{d}[^{3}H]5-HT uptake to [^{3}H]DA uptake ratio.
- ^{e}[^{3}H]NE uptake to [^{3}H]DA uptake ratio.

=== Carboxyaryl ===
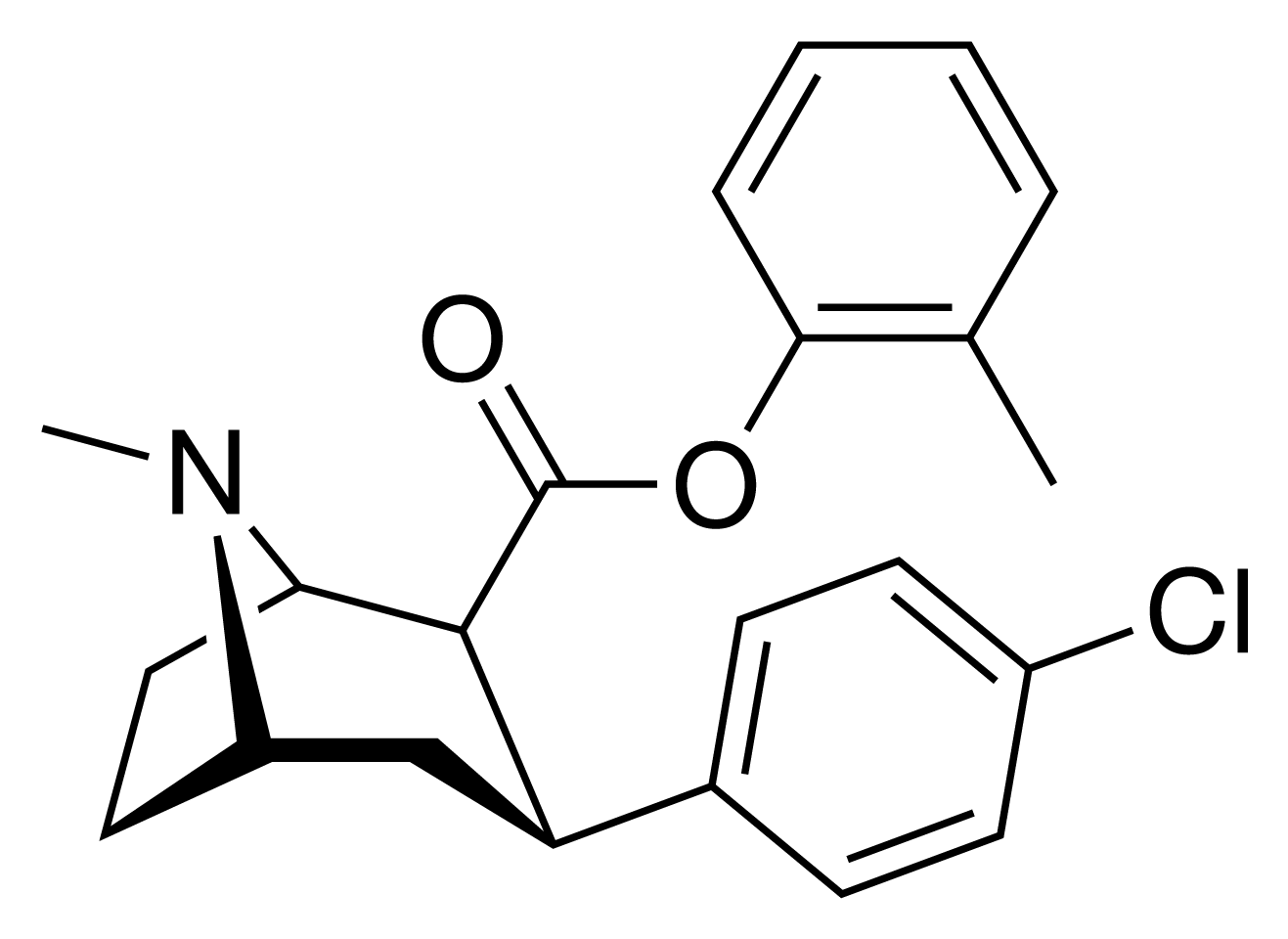

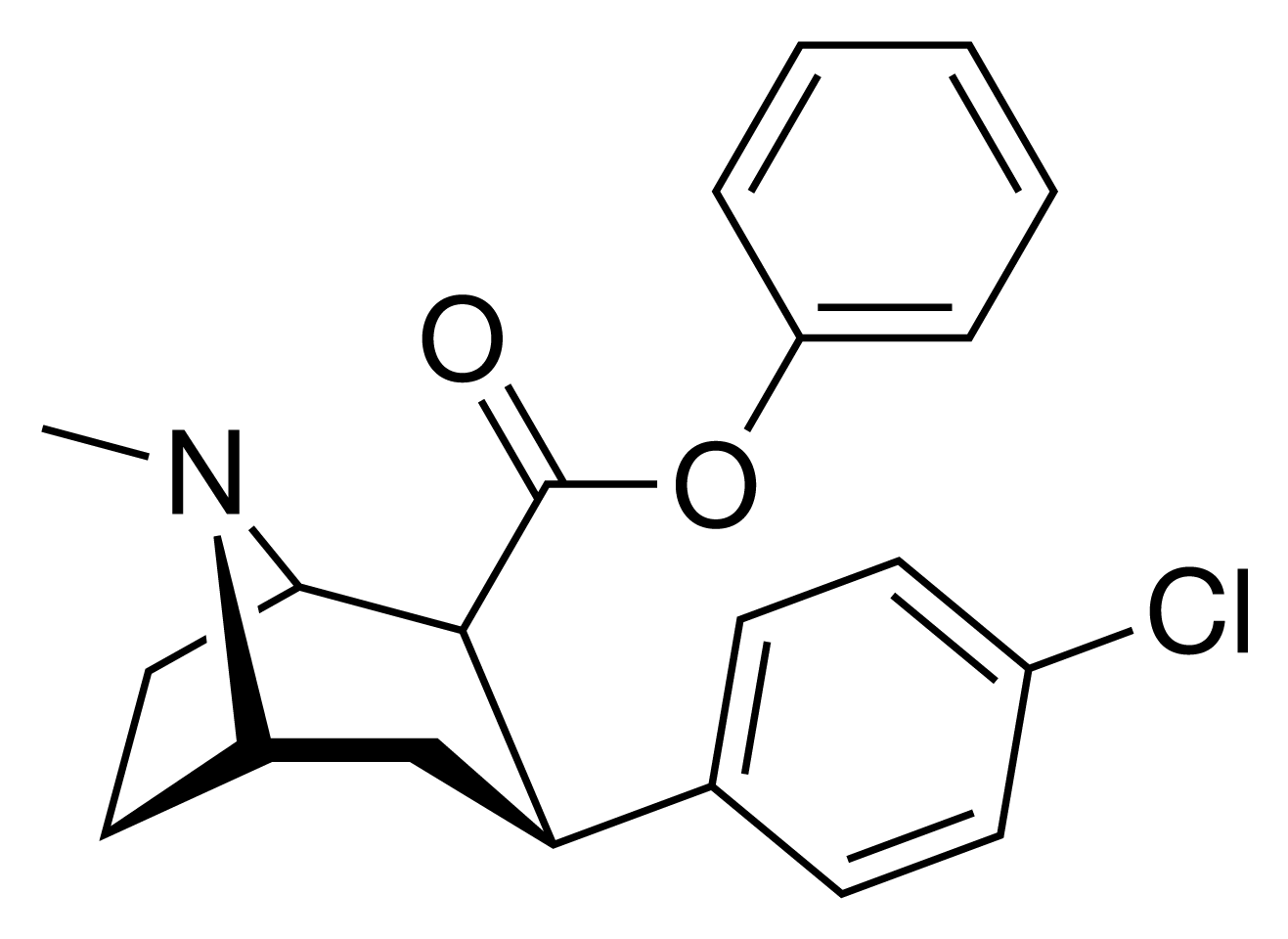

Compound	X	2 Position	config	8	DA	5-HT	NE
RTI-122	I	-CO_{2}Ph	β,β	NMe	1.50	184	3,791
RTI-113	Cl	-CO_{2}Ph	β,β	NMe	1.98	2,336	2,955
RTI-277	NO_{2}	-CO_{2}Ph	β,β	NMe	5.94	2,910	5,695
RTI-120 [recheck]	Me	-CO_{2}Ph	β,β	NMe	3.26	24,471	5,833
RTI-116	Cl	-CO_{2}(p-C_{6}H_{4}I)	β,β	NMe	33	1,227	968
RTI-203	Cl	CO_{2}(m-C_{6}H_{4}Me)	β,β	NMe	9.37	2153	2744
RTI-204	Cl	-CO_{2}(o-C_{6}H_{4}Me)	β,β	NMe	3.91	3,772	4,783
RTI-205	Me	-CO_{2}(m-C_{6}H_{4}Me)	β,β	NMe	8.19	5,237	2,137
RTI-206	Cl	-CO_{2}(p-C_{6}H_{4}Me)	β,β	NMe	27.4	1,203	1,278

==== 2-Phenyl-3-Phenyltropanes ====
2-Phenyl-3-phenyltropane binding affinities and inhibition of DA & 5-HT Uptake
Compound Structure	Short Name (S. Singh)	Stereochemistry	X (para)	DAT [^{3}H]WIN 35428 IC_{50} (nM)	DAT [^{3}H]Mazindol K_{i} (nM)	5-HTT [^{3}H]Paroxetine IC_{50} (nM)	[^{3}H]DA uptake K_{i} (nM)	[^{3}H]5-HT uptake K_{i} (nM)	Selectivity [^{3}H]5-HT/[^{3}H]DA
	Cocaine	(2β,3β)	(H)	89 ± 4.8	281	1050 ± 89	423	155	0.4
	67a	2β,3β	H	12.6 ± 1.8	14.9	21000 ± 3320	28.9	1100	38.1
	67b	2β,3α	H	-	13.8	-	11.7	753	64.3
	67c	2α,3α	H	690 ± 37	-	41300 ± 5300	-	-	-
	68	2β,3α	F	-	6.00	-	4.58	122	26.6
	69a	2β,3β	CH_{3}	1.96 ± 0.08	2.58	11000 ± 83	2.87	73.8	25.7
	69b	2β,3α	CH_{3}	-	2.87	-	4.16	287	69.0
	69c	2α,3α	CH_{3}	429 ± 59	-	15800 ± 3740	-	-	-

=== Carboxyalkyl ===
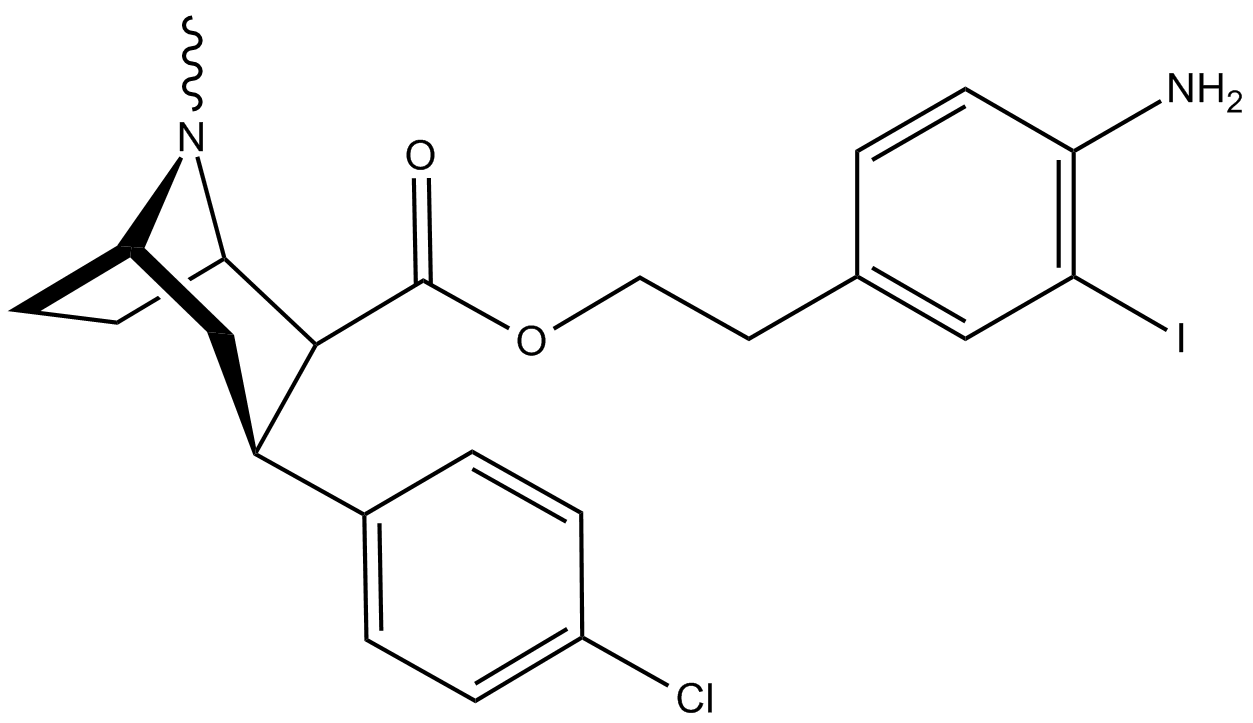

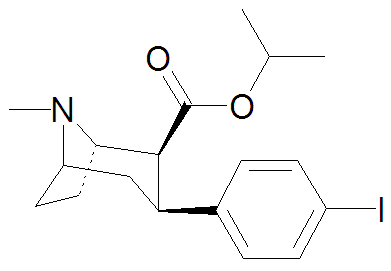

Code	X	2 Position	config	8	DA	5-HT	NE
RTI-77	Cl	CH_{2}C_{2}(3-iodo-p-anilino)	β,β	NMe	2.51	—	2247
RTI-121 IPCIT	I	-CO_{2}Pr^{i}	β,β	NMe	0.43	66.8	285
RTI-153	I	-CO_{2}Pr^{i}	β,β	NH	1.06	3.59	132
RTI-191	I	-CO_{2}Pr^{cyc}	β,β	NMe	0.61	15.5	102
RTI-114	Cl	-CO_{2}Pr^{i}	β,β	NMe	1.40	1,404	778
RTI-278	NO_{2}	-CO_{2}Pr^{i}	β,β	NMe	8.14	2,147	4,095
RTI-190	Cl	-CO_{2}Pr^{cyc}	β,β	NMe	0.96	168	235
RTI-193	Me	-CO_{2}Pr^{cyc}	β,β	NMe	1.68	1,066	644
RTI-117	Me	-CO_{2}Pr^{i}	β,β	NMe	6.45	6,090	1,926
RTI-150	Me	-CO_{2}Bu^{cyc}	β,β	NMe	3.74	2,020	4,738
RTI-127	Me	-CO_{2}C(H)Et_{2}	β,β	NMe	19	4500	3444
RTI-338	ethyl	-CO_{2}C_{2}Ph	β,β	NMe	1104	7.41	3366

Use of a cyclopropyl ester appears to enable better MAT retention than does the choice of isopropyl ester.

Use of a ^{cyc}Bu resulted in greater DAT selectivity than did the ^{cyc}Pr homologue.

==== 2-Alkyl Esters & Ethers ====
===== Esters (2-Alkyl) =====
2β-Alkyl Ester Phenyltropanes
Structure	Short Name (S. Singh)	2β=R	K_{i} (nM) DAT [^{3}H]WIN 35428	IC_{50} (nM) [^{3}H]DA uptake	Selectivity uptake/binding
	59a	CH=CHCO_{2}CH_{3}	22 ± 2	123 ± 65	5.6
	59b	CH_{2}CH_{2}CO_{2}CH_{3}	23 ± 2	166 ± 68	7.2
	59c	(CH_{2})_{2}CH=CHCO_{2}CH_{3}	20 ± 2	203 ± 77	10.1
	59d	(CH_{22})_{4}CO_{2}CH_{3}	30 ± 2	130 ± 7	4.3
	59e	CH=CHCH_{2}OH	26 ± 3	159 ± 43	6.1
	59f	CH_{2}CH_{2}CH_{2}OH	11 ± 1	64 ± 32	5.8
	59g	CH_{2}CH_{2}COC_{6}H_{5}	28 ± 2	47 ± 15	1.7

===== Ethers (2-Alkyl) =====
2-Alkyl Ether Phenyltropanes
Molecular Structure	Short Name (S. Singh)	Stereochemistry	DAT [^{3}H]WIN 35428 IC_{50} (nM)	5-HTT [^{3}H]Paroxetine IC_{50} (nM)	NET [^{3}H]Nisoxetine IC_{50} (nM)	Selectivity 5-HTT/DAT	Selectivity NET/DAT
	Paroxetine		623 ± 25	0.28 ± 0.02	535 ± 15	0.0004	0.8
	R-60a	2β,3β	308 ± 20	294 ± 18	5300 ± 450	0.9	17.2
	R-60b	2α,3β	172 ± 8.8	52.9 ± 3.6	26600 ± 1200	0.3	155
	R-60c	2β,3α	3.01 ± 0.2	42.2 ± 16	123 ± 9.5	14.1	40.9
	S-60d	2β,3β	1050 ± 45	88.1 ± 2.8	27600 ± 1100	0.08	26.3
	S-60e	2α,3β	1500 ± 74	447 ± 47	2916 ± 1950	0.3	1.9
	S-60f	2β,3α	298 ± 17	178 ± 13	12400 ± 720	0.6	41.6

=== Carboxamides ===
U.S. patent 5,736,123

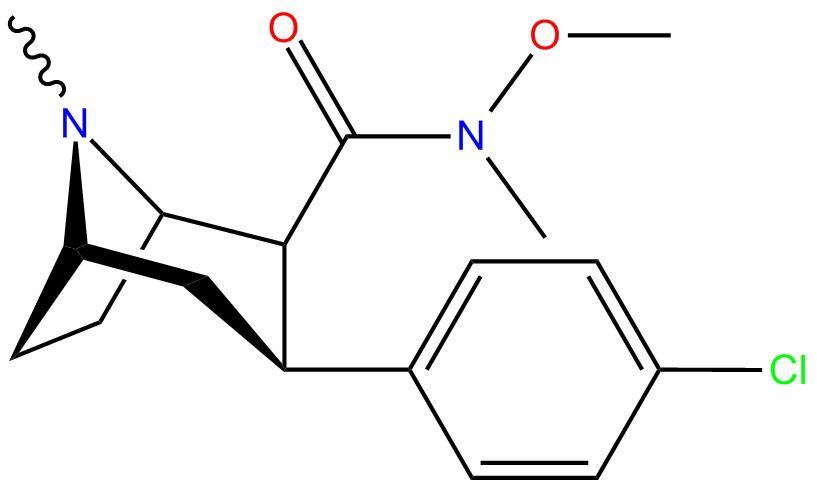

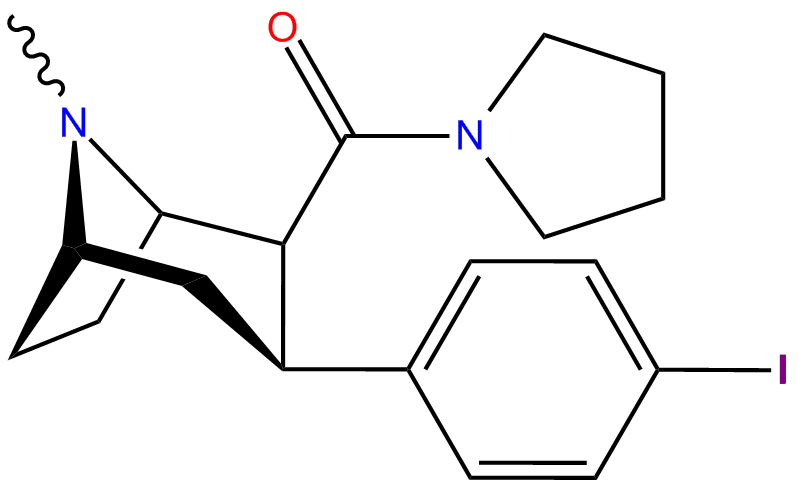

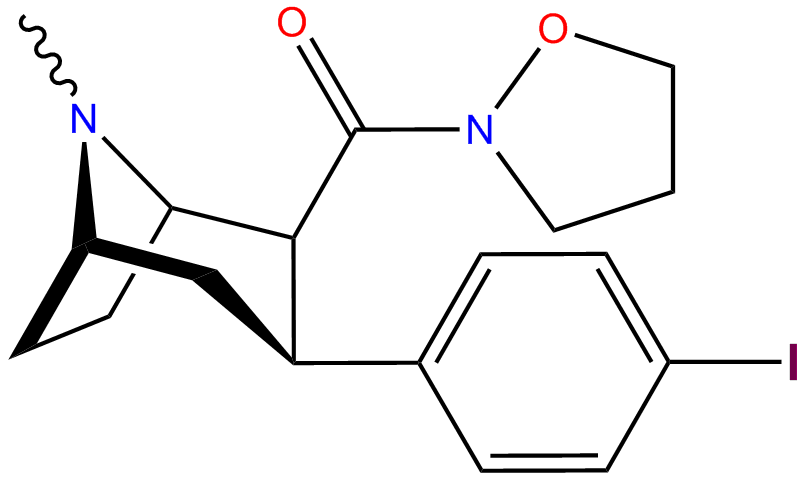

Structure	Code (S. Singh #)	X	2 Position	config	8	DA [^{3}H]WIN 35428 (IC_{50} nM)	NE [^{3}H]nisoxetine	5-HT [^{3}H]paroxetine (IC_{50} nM)	Selectivity 5-HTT/DAT	Selectivity NET/DAT
	RTI-106; 27b	Cl	CON(H)Me	β,β	NMe	12.4 ± 1.17	1584 ± 62	1313 ± 46	106	128
	RTI-118; 27a	Cl	CONH_{2}	β,β	NMe	11.5 ± 1.6	4270 ± 359	1621 ± 110	141	371
	RTI-222; 29d	Me	morpholinyl	β,β	NMe	11.7 ± 0.87	23601 ± 1156	>100K	>8547	2017
	RTI-129; 27e	Cl	CONMe_{2}	β,β	NMe	1.38 ± 0.1	942 ± 48	1079 ± 102	792	683
	RTI-146; 27d	Cl	CONHCH_{2}OH	β,β	NMe	2.05 ± 0.23	144 ± 3	97.8 ± 10	47.7	70.2
	RTI-147; 27i	Cl	CON(CH_{2})_{4}	β,β	NMe	1.38 ± 0.03	3,950 ± 72	12400 ± 1207	8985	2862
	RTI-156	Cl	CON(CH_{2})_{5}	β,β	NMe	6.61	5832	3468		
	RTI-170	Cl	CON(H)CH_{2}C≡CH	β,β	NMe	16.5	1839	4827		
	RTI-172	Cl	CON(H)NH_{2}	β,β	NMe	44.1	3914	3815		
	RTI-174	Cl	CONHCOMe	β,β	NMe	158	>43K	>125K		
	RTI-182	Cl	CONHCH_{2}COPh	β,β	NMe	7.79	1722	827		
	RTI-183✲ 27 g	Cl	CON(OMe)Me	β,β	NMe	0.85 ± 0.06	549 ± 18.5	724 ± 94	852	646
	RTI-186; 29c	Me	CON(OMe)Me	β,β	NMe	2.55 ± 0.43	422 ± 26	3402 ± 353	1334	165
	RTI-198; 27h	Cl	CON(CH_{2})_{3}	β,β	NMe	6.57 ± 0.67	990 ± 4.8	814 ± 57	124	151
	RTI-196; 27c	Cl	CONHOMe	β,β	NMe	10.7 ± 1.25	9907 ± 632	43700 ± 1960	4084	926
	RTI-201	Cl	CONHNHCOPh	β,β	NMe	91.8	>20K	>48K		
	RTI-208; 27j	Cl	CONO(CH_{2})_{3}	β,β	NMe	1.47 ± 0.13	1083 ± 76	2470 ± 56	1680	737
	RTI-214; 27l	Cl	CON(-CH_{2}CH_{2}-)_{2}O	β,β	NMe	2.90 ± 0.3	8545 ± 206	88769 ± 1855	30610	2946
	RTI-215; 27f	Cl	CONEt_{2}	β,β	NMe	5.48 ± 0.19	5532 ± 299	9433 ± 770	1721	1009
	RTI-217	Cl	CONH(m-C_{6}H_{4}OH)	β,β	NMe	4.78	>30K	>16K		
	RTI-218✲	Cl	CON(Me)OMe	β,β	NMe	1.19	520	1911		
	RTI-226; 27 m	Cl	CONMePh	β,β	NMe	45.5 ± 3	2202 ± 495	23610 ± 2128	519	48.4
	RTI-227	I	CONO(CH_{2})_{3}	β,β	NMe	0.75	446	230		
	RTI-229; 28a	I	CON(CH_{2})_{4}	β,β	NMe	0.37 ± 0.04	991 ± 21	1728 ± 39	4670	2678
	27k					6.95 ± 1.21	1752 ± 202	3470 ± 226	499	252
	28b					1.08 ± 0.15	103 ± 6.2	73.9 ± 8.1	68.4	95.4
	28c					0.75 ± 0.02	357 ± 42	130 ± 15.8	173	476
	29a					41.8 ± 2.45	4398 ± 271	6371 ± 374	152	105
	29b					24.7 ± 1.93	6222 ± 729	33928 ± 2192	1374	252

✲RTI-183 and RTI-218 suggest possible copy-error, seeing as "CON(OMe)Me" & "CON(Me)OMe" difference between methyl & methoxy render as the same.

2β-Carboxamide-3β-Phenyltropanes
Compound	Short Name (S. Singh)	R	X	IC_{50} (nM) DAT [^{3}H]WIN 35428	IC_{50} (nM) 5-HTT [^{3}H]Paroxetine	IC_{50} (nM) NET [^{3}H]Nisoxetine	Selectivity 5-HTT/DAT	Selectivity NET/DAT
	29a	NH_{2}	CH_{3}	41.8 ± 2.45	6371 ± 374	4398 ± 271	152	105
	29b	N(CH_{2}CH_{3})_{2}	CH_{3}	24.7 ± 1.93	33928 ± 2192	6222 ± 729	1374	252
	29c RTI-186	N(OCH_{3})CH_{3}	CH_{3}	2.55 ± 0.43	3402 ± 353	422 ± 26	1334	165
	29d RTI-222	4-morpholine	CH_{3}	11.7 ± 0.87	>100000	23601 ± 1156	>8547	2017

==== Carboxamide linked phenyltropanes dimers ====

Dimers of phenyltropanes, connected in their dual form using the C2 locant as altered toward a carboxamide structural configuring (in contrast and away from the usual inherent ecgonine carbmethoxy), as per Frank Ivy Carroll's patent inclusive of such chemical compounds, possibly so patented due to being actively delayed pro-drugs in vivo.

=== Heterocycles ===
These heterocycles are sometimes referred to as the "bioisosteric equivalent" of the simpler esters from which they are derived. A potential disadvantage of leaving the ββ-ester unreacted is that in addition to being hydrolyzable, it can also epimerize to the energetically more favorable trans configuration. This can happen to cocaine also.

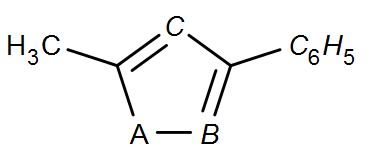
Atomic positions A—C (compound model 34)

Several of the oxadiazoles contain the same number and types of heteroatoms, while their respective binding potencies display 8×-15× difference. A finding that would not be accounted for by their affinity originating from hydrogen bonding.

To explore the possibility of electrostatic interactions, the use of molecular electrostatic potentials (MEP) were employed with model compound 34 (replacing the phenyltropane moiety with a methyl group). Focusing on the vicinity of the atoms @ positions A—C, the minima of electrostatic potential near atom position A (ΔV_{min}(A)), calculated with semi-empirical (AM1) quantum mechanics computations (superimposing the heterocyclic and phenyl rings to ascertain the least in the way of steric and conformational discrepancies) found a correlation between affinity @ DAT and ΔV_{min}(A): wherein the values for the latter for 32c = 0, 32g = -4, 32h = -50 & 32i = -63 kcal/mol.

In contrast to this trend, it is understood that an increasingly negative ΔV_{min} is correlated with an increase of strength in hydrogen bonding, which is the opposing trend for the above; this indicates that the 2β-substituents (at least for the heterocyclic class) are dominated by electrostatic factors for binding in-the-stead of the presumptive hydrogen bonding model for this substituent of the cocaine-like binding ligand. (Note: ←Page #940 (16th page of article) underneath Table 8., above § 4)

==== 3-Substituted-isoxazol-5-yl ====

N-methylphenyltropanes with 1R β,β stereochemistry.
Code (S.S. #)	X	R	DA	NE	5HT
RTI-165	Cl	3-methylisoxazol-5-yl	0.59	181	572
RTI-171	Me	3-methylisoxazol-5-yl	0.93	254	3818
RTI-180	I	3-methylisoxazol-5-yl	0.73	67.9	36.4
RTI-177 β-CPPIT; 32g	Cl	3-phenylisoxazol-5-yl	1.28 ± 0.18	504 ± 29	2420 ± 136
RTI-176	Me	3-phenylisoxazol-5-yl	1.58	398	5110
RTI-181	I	3-phenylisoxazol-5-yl	2.57	868	100
RTI-184	H	methyl	43.3	—	6208
RTI-185	H	Ph	285	—	>12K
RTI-334	Cl	3-ethylisoxazol-5-yl	0.50	120	3086
RTI-335	Cl	isopropyl	1.19	954	2318
RTI-336	Cl	3-(4-methylphenyl)isoxazol-5-yl	4.09	1714	5741
RTI-337	Cl	3-t-butyl-isoxazol-5-yl	7.31	6321	37K
RTI-345	Cl	p-chlorophenyl	6.42	5290	>76K
RTI-346	Cl	p-anisyl	1.57	762	5880
RTI-347	Cl	p-fluorophenyl	1.86	918	7257
RTI-354	Me	3-ethylisoxazol-5-yl	1.62	299	6400
RTI-366	Me	R = isopropyl	4.5	2523 (1550)	42,900 (3900)
RTI-371	Me	p-chlorophenyl	8.74	>100K (60,200)	>100K (9090)
RTI-386	Me	p-anisyl	3.93	756 (450)	4027 (380)
RTI-387	Me	p-fluorophenyl	6.45	917 (546)	>100K (9400)

==== 3-Substituted-1,2,4-oxadiazole ====
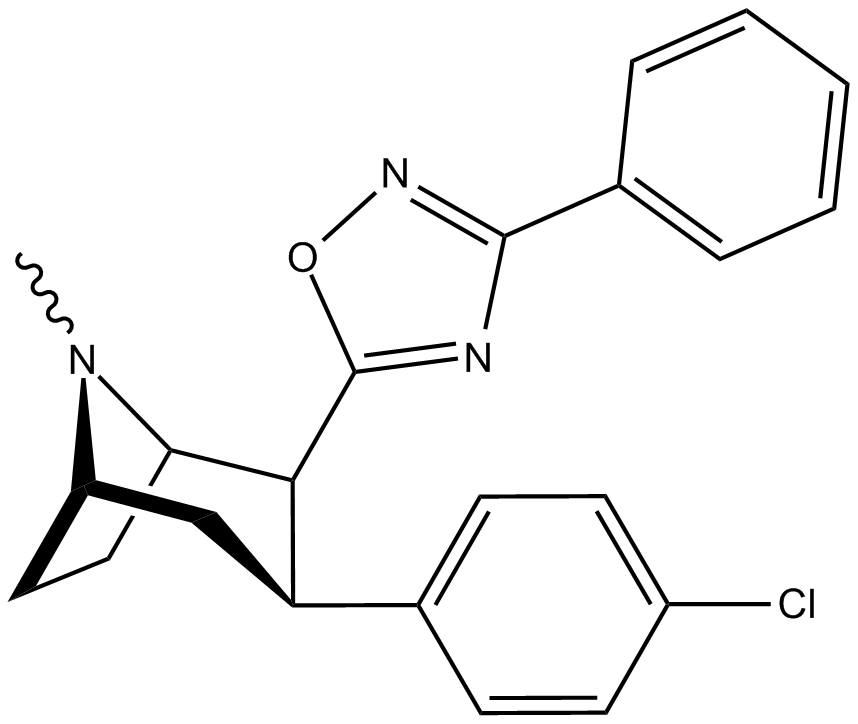

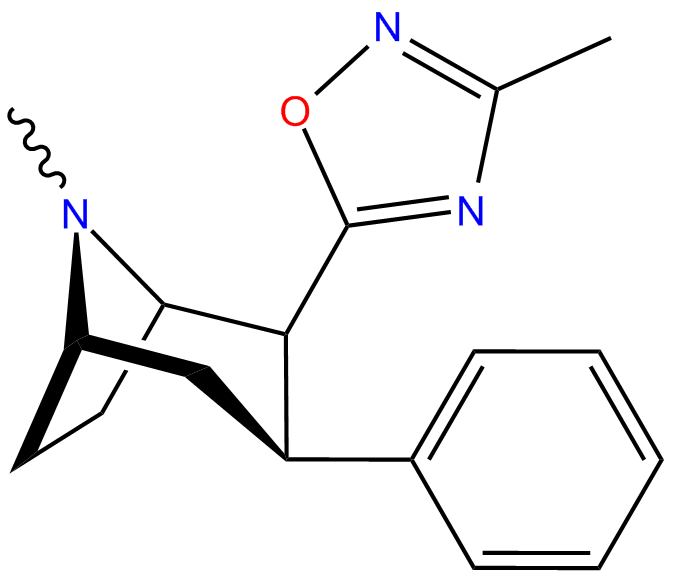

Heterocyclic (N-methyl)phenyltropanes with 1R stereochemistry.
Structure	Code (Singh's #)	X	R	DAT (IC_{50} nM) displacement of [^{3}H]WIN 35428	NET (IC_{50} nM) [^{3}H]nisoxetine	5-HTT (IC_{50} nM) [^{3}H]paroxetine	Selectivity 5-HTT/DAT	Selectivity NET/DAT
	ααRTI-87	H	3-methyl-1,2,4-oxadiazole	204	36K	30K		
	βαRTI-119	H	3-methyl-1,2,4-oxadiazole	167	7K	41K		
	αβRTI-124	H	3-methyl-1,2,4-oxadiazole	1028	71K	33K		
	RTI-125 (32a)	Cl	3-methyl-1,2,4-oxadiazole	4.05 ± 0.57	363 ± 36	2584 ± 800	637	89.6
	ββRTI-126 (31)	H	3-methyl-1,2,4-oxadiazole	100 ± 6	7876 ± 551	3824 ± 420	38.3	788
	RTI-130 (32c)	Cl	3-phenyl-1,2,4-oxadiazole	1.62 ± 0.02	245 ± 13	195 ± 5	120	151
	RTI-141 (32d)	Cl	3-(p-anisyl)-1,2,4-oxadiazole	1.81 ± 0.19	835 ± 8	337 ± 40	186	461
	RTI-143 (32e)	Cl	3-(p-chlorophenyl)-1,2,4-oxadiazole	4.06 ± 0.22	40270 ± 180 (4069)	404 ± 56	99.5	9919
	RTI-144 (32f)	Cl	3-(p-bromophenyl)-1,2,4-oxadiazole	3.44 ± 0.36	1825 ± 170	106 ± 10	30.8	532
	βRTI-151 (33)	Me	3-phenyl-1,2,4-oxadiazole	2.33 ± 0.26	60 ± 2	1074 ± 130	459	25.7
	αRTI-152	Me	3-phenyl-1,2,4-oxadiazole	494	—	1995		
	RTI-154 (32b)	Cl	3-isopropyl-1,2,4-oxadiazole	6.00 ± 0.55	135 ± 13	3460 ± 250	577	22.5
	RTI-155	Cl	3-cyclopropyl-1,2,4-oxadiazole	3.41	177	4362		

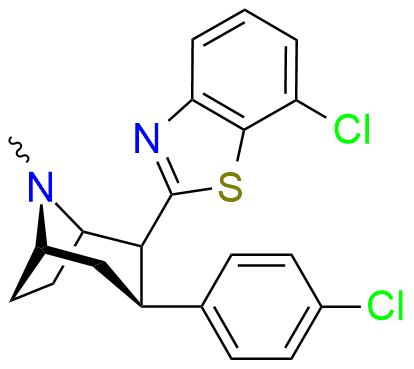
RTI-4229-470 structure. Highly excited 94 pM DAT signal.

↑ above: 2D skeletal depiction.

↓ below: 3D tube model.

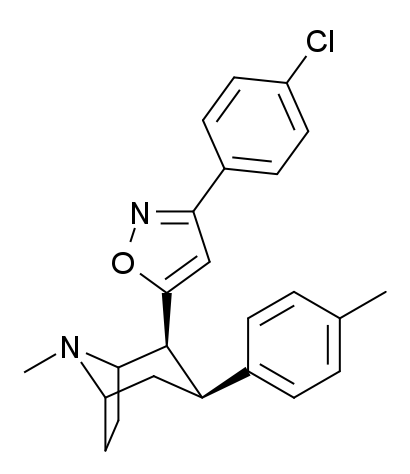
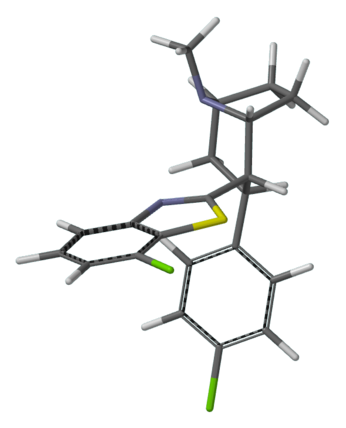
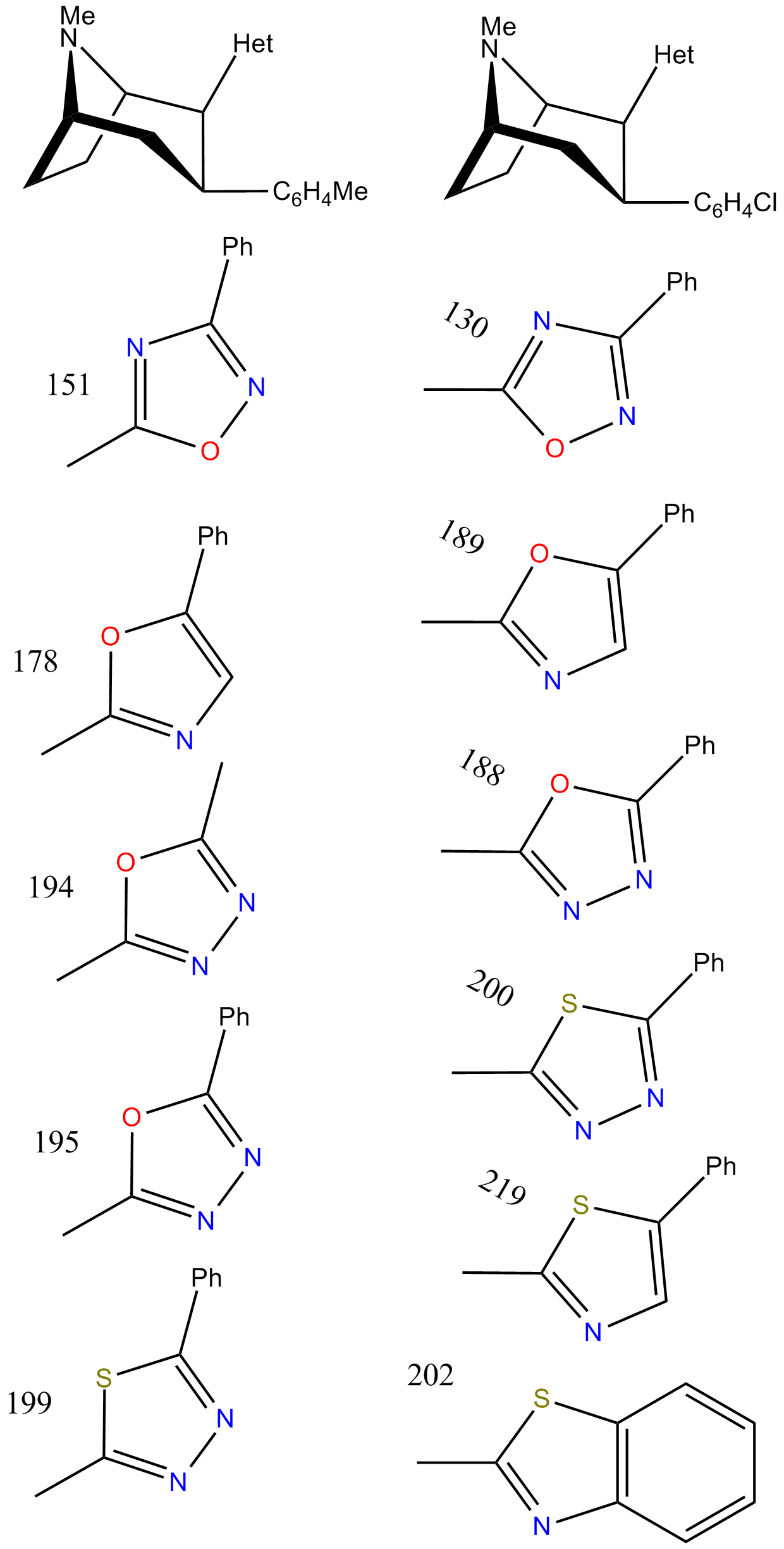

N-methylphenyltropanes with 1R β,β stereochemistry.
Structure	Code	X	2 Group	DAT (IC_{50} nM) displacement of [^{3}H]WIN 35428	NET (IC_{50} nM) displacement of [^{3}H]nisoxetine	5-HTT (IC_{50} nM) displacement of [^{3}H]paroxetine	Selectivity 5-HTT/DAT	Selectivity NET/DAT
	RTI-157	Me	tetrazole	1557	>37K	>43K		
	RTI-163	Cl	tetrazole	911	—	5456		
	RTI-178	Me	5-phenyl-oxazol-2-yl	35.4	677	1699		
	RTI-188	Cl	5-phenyl-1,3,4-oxadiazol-2-yl	12.6	930	3304		
	RTI-189 (32i)	Cl	5-phenyl-oxazol-2-yl	19.7 ± 1.98	496 ± 42	1120 ± 107	56.8	25.5
	RTI-194	Me	5-methyl-1,3,4-oxadiazol-2-yl	4.45	253	4885		
	RTI-195	Me	5-phenyl-1,3,4-oxadiazol-2-yl	47.5	1310	>22,000		
	RTI-199	Me	5-phenyl-1,3,4-thiadiazol-2-yl	35.9	>24,000	>51,000		
	RTI-200	Cl	5-phenyl-1,3,4-thiadiazol-2-yl	15.3	4142	>18,000		
	RTI-202	Cl	benzothiazol-2-yl	1.37	403	1119		
	RTI-219	Cl	5-phenylthiazol-2-yl	5.71	8516	10,342		
	RTI-262	Cl		188.2 ± 5.01	595.25 ± 5738	5207 ± 488	316	28
	RTI-370	Me	3-(p-cresyl)isoxazol-5-yl	8.74	6980	>100K		
	RTI-371	Cl	3-(p-chlorophenyl)isoxazol-5-yl	13	>100K	>100K		
	RTI-436	Me	-CH=CHPh	3.09	1960 (1181)	335 (31)		
	RTI-470	Cl	o-Cl-benzothiazol-2-yl	0.094	1590 (994)	1080 (98)		
	RTI-451	Me	benzothiazol-2-yl	1.53	476 (287)	7120 (647)		
	32g			1.28 ± 0.18	504 ± 29	2420 ± 136	1891	394
	32h			12.6 ± 10.3	929 ± 88	330 ± 196	262	73.7

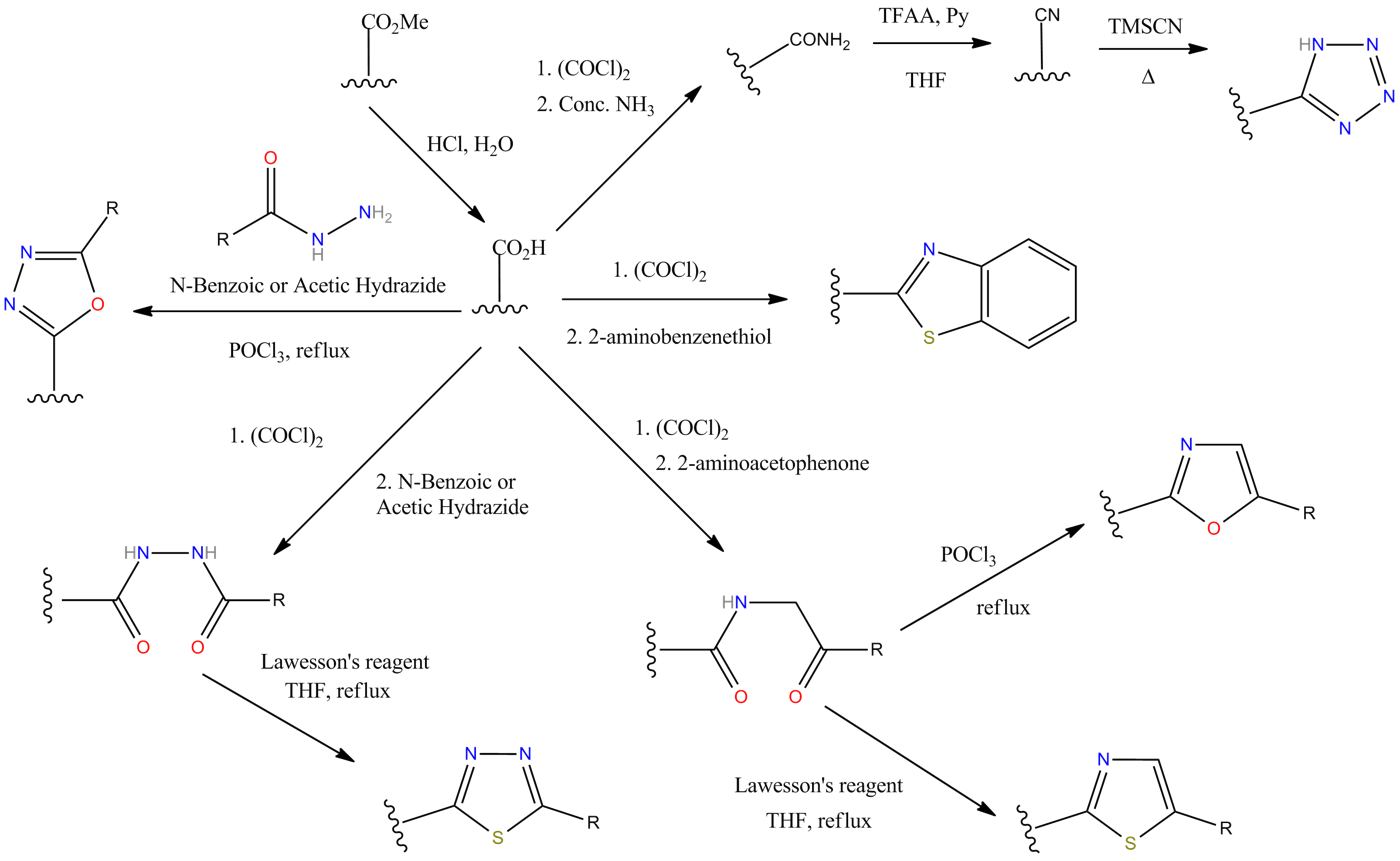
Above is taken from: RTI, Kuhar, et al. U.S. patent 5,935,953 (1999).

N.B There are some alternative ways of making the tetrazole ring however; Cf. the sartan drugs synthesis schemes. Bu_{3}SnN_{3} is a milder choice of reagent than hydrogen azide (cf. Irbesartan).

=== Acyl (C2-propanoyl) ===

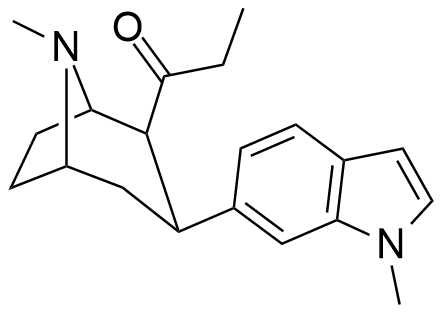
Indolyl
cf. the Tamagnan series of phenyltropanes for examples with a methylene unit spacer breaking up the indole.

# (#)	X	Y	2 Position	config	8	DA	5-HT	NE
WF-23 (39n)	β-naphthyl		C(O)Et	β,β	NMe	0.115	0.394	No data
WF-31 PIT	-Pr^{i}	H	C.O.Et	β,β	NMe	615	54.5	No data
WF-11^{✲} PTT (39e)	Me	H	-C.O.Et	β,β	NMe	8.2	131	No data
WF-25 (39a)	H	H	-C.O.Et	β,β	NMe	48.3	1005	No data
WF-33	6-MeoBN		C(O)Et	α,β	NMe	0.13	2.24	No data
^{✲}Compound WF-11 has been shown, under consistent exposure, to elicit a biological response opposite of cocaine i.e. tyrosine hydroxylase gene expression down-regulation (instead of up-regulation as has been observed to be the case for chronic cocaine administration)

2β-acyl-3β-phenyltropane structures (Note: ←Page #941 (17th page of article) Figure 10)
Structure	S. Singh's alphanumeric assignation (name)	R_{1}	R_{2}	DAT [^{125}I]RTI-55 IC_{50} (nM)	5-HTT [^{3}H]Paroxetine K_{i} (nM)	Selectivity 5-HTT/DAT
	cocaine			173 ± 19	—	—
	Troparil; 11a (WIN 35065–2)			98.8 ± 12.2	—	—
	WF-25; 39a	C_{2}H_{5}	C_{6}H_{5}	48.3 ± 2.8	1005 ± 112	20.8
	39b	CH_{3}	C_{6}H_{5}	114 ± 22	1364 ± 616	12.0
	39c	C_{2}H_{5}	C_{6}H_{4}-4-F	15.3 ± 2.8	630 ± 67	41.2
	39d	CH_{3}	C_{6}H_{4}-4-F	70.8 ± 13	857 ± 187	12.1
	WF-11; 39e	C_{2}H_{5}	C_{6}H_{4}-4-CH_{3}	8.2 ± 1.6	131 ± 1	16.0
	(+)-39e	C_{2}H_{5}	C_{6}H_{4}-4-CH_{3}	4.21 ± 0.05	74 ± 12	17.6
	(-)-39e	C_{2}H_{5}	C_{6}H_{4}-4-CH_{3}	1337 ± 122	>10000	—
	39f	CH_{3}	C_{6}H_{4}-4-CH_{3}	9.8 ± 0.5	122 ± 22	12.4
	39g	CH_{3}	C_{6}H_{4}-4-C_{2}H_{5}	152 ± 24	78.2 ± 22	0.5
	39h	C_{2}H_{5}	C_{6}H_{4}-4-CH(CH_{3})_{2}	436 ± 41	35.8 ± 4.4	0.08
	39i	C_{2}H_{5}	C_{6}H_{4}-4-C(CH_{3})_{3}	2120 ± 630	1771 ± 474	0.8
	39j	C_{2}H_{5}	C_{6}H_{4}-4-C_{6}H_{5}	2.29 ± 1.08	4.31 ± 0.01	1.9
	39k	C_{2}H_{5}	C_{6}H_{4}-2-CH_{3}	1287 ± 322	710000	>7.8
	39l	C_{2}H_{5}	1-naphthyl	5.43 ± 1.27	20.9 ± 2.9	3.8
	39m	CH_{3}	1-naphthyl	10.1 ± 2.2	25.6 ± 5.1	2.5
	WF-23; 39n	C_{2}H_{5}	2-naphthyl	0.115 ± 0.021	0.394 ± 0.074	3.5
	39o	CH_{3}	2-naphthyl	0.28 ± 0.11	1.06 ± 0.36	3.8
	39p	C_{2}H_{5}	C_{6}H_{4}-4-CH(C_{2}H_{5})_{2}	270 ± 38	540 ± 51	2.0
	39q	C_{2}H_{5}	C_{6}H_{4}-4-C_{6}H_{11}	320 ± 55	97 ± 12	0.30
	39r	C_{2}H_{5}	C_{6}H_{4}-4-CH=CH_{2}	0.90 ± 0.34	3.2 ± 1.3	3.5
	39s	C_{2}H_{5}	C_{6}H_{4}-4-C(=CH_{2})CH_{3}	7.2 ± 2.1	0.82 ± 0.38	0.1

==== 2β-Acyl-3β-naphthyl substituted ====
2β-Acyl-3β-(substituted naphthyl)-8-azabicyclo[3.2.1]octanes
Structure	Short Assignation (Numeric code, Davies UB) S. Singh	R	DAT [^{125}H]RTI-55^{ɑ} IC_{50} nM	SERT [^{3}H]paroxetine^{b} K_{i} nM	NET [^{3}H]nisoxetine^{c} K_{i} nM	potency ratio SERT/DAT	potency ratio SERT/NET
	WF-11 (6)	4′-Me	8.2 ± 1.6	131 ± 10	65 ± 9.2	0.06	0.5
	WF-31 (7)	4′-^{i}Pr	436 ± 41	36 ± 4	>10,000	12	>250
	WF-23 (8)	2-naphthalene	0.12 ± 0.02	0.39 ± 0.07	2.9 ± 0.5	0.3	7
	2β-acyl-3β-1-naphthalene (9a)	4′-H	5.3 ± 1.3	21 ± 2.9	49 ± 10	0.3	18
	(9b)	4′-Me	25.1 ± 0.5	8.99 ± 1.70	163 ± 36	3	18
	(9c)	4′-Et	75.1 ± 11.9	175 ± 25	4769 ± 688	0.7	27
	(9d)	4′-^{i}Pr	225 ± 36	136 ± 64	>10,000	2	>73.5
	(10a)	6′-Et	0.15 ± 0.04	0.38 ± 0.19	27.7 ± 9.6	0.4	74
	(10b)	6′-^{i}Pr	0.39 ± 0.04	1.97 ± 0.33	no data	0.2	—
	(10c^{e})	6′- OMe	0.13 ± 0.04	2.24 ± 0.34	no data	0.05	—
	(10d)	5′-Et, 6′-OMe	30.8 ± 6.6	7.55 ± 1.57	3362 ± 148	4.1	445
	(10e)	5′-C(Me)=CH_{2}, 6′-OMe	45.0 ± 3.7	88.0 ± 13.3	2334 ± 378	0.5	26.5
	(10f)	6′-I	0.35 ± 0.07	0.37 ± 0.02	no data	1.0	—
	(10g)	7′-I	0.45 ± 0.05	0.47 ± 0.02	no data	0.5^{d}	—
	(10h)	5′-NO_{2}, 6′-OMe	148 ± 50	15 ± 1.6	no data	10	—
	(10i)	5′-I, 6′-OMe	1.31 ± 0.33	2.27 ± 0.31	781 ± 181	0.6	344
	(10j)	5′-COMe, 6′-OMe	12.6 ± 3.8	15.8 ± 1.65	498 ± 24	0.8	32
	(11a)	2β-COCH_{3}, 1-naphthyl	10 ± 2.2	26 ± 5.1	165 ± 40	0.4	6.3
	(11b)	2α-COCH_{3}, 1-naphthyl	97 ± 21	217 ± 55	no data	0.45	—
	(11c)	2α-COCH_{2}CH_{3}, 2-naphthyl	2.51 ± 0.82	16.4 ± 2.0	68.0 ± 10.8	0.15	4.1
	(11d)	2β-COCH_{3}, 2-naphthyl	1.27 ± 0.15	1.06 ± 0.36	4.9 ± 1.2	1.2	4.6
	(11e)	2β-COCH(CH_{3})_{2}, 2-naphthyl	0.25 ± 0.08	2.08 ± 0.80	37.6 ± 10.5	0.12	18.1
	(11f); 79a	2β-COCH_{2}CH_{3}, 2-naphthyl, N8-demethyl	0.03 ± 0.01	0.23 ± 0.07	2.05 ± 0.9	0.13	8.9

- ^{ɑ} nonspecific binding was determined in the presence of 1.0 μM WF-23
  (source equates WF-23 as analogue 3a, but table gives # as analogue 8)
- ^{b} nonspecific binding was determined in the presence of 10.0 μM fluoxetine
- ^{c} nonspecific binding was determined in the presence of 1.0 μM desipramine
- ^{d} ratio shown as halved; a possible copy-error due to closeness to 1:1 of other indicated values
- ^{e} sources differ on whether C2 position acyl is alpha or beta configured

=== Ester reduction ===
Note: p-fluorophenyl is weaker than the others. RTI-145 is not peroxy, it is a methyl carbonate.

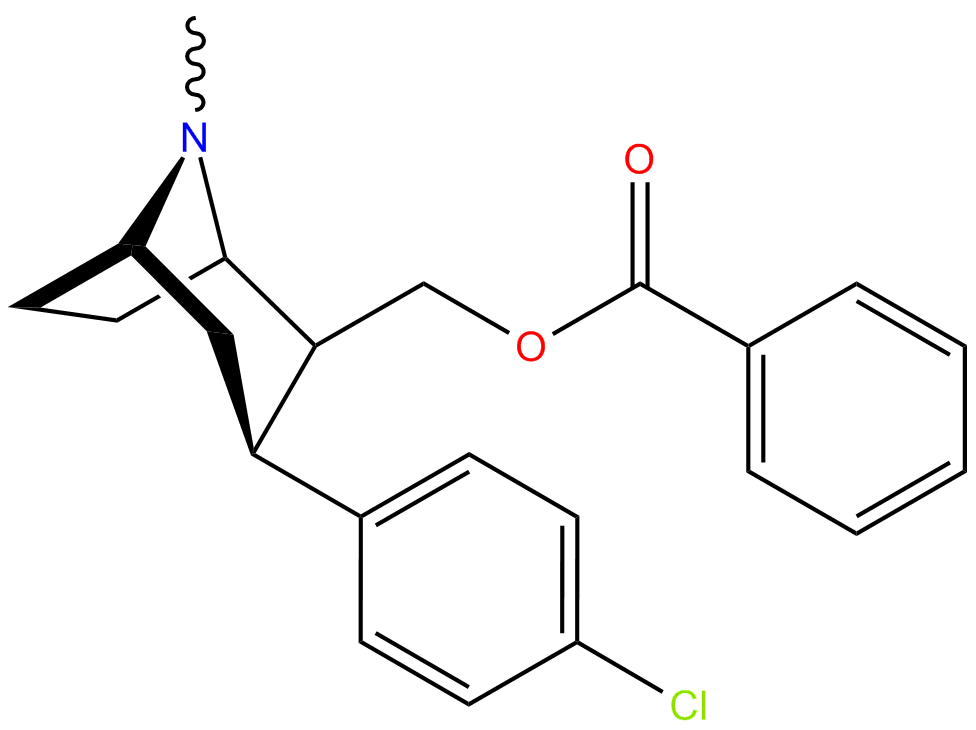

Code	X	2 Position	config	8	DA	5-HT	NE
RTI-100	F	-CH_{2}OH	β,β	NMe	47	4741	no data
RTI-101	I	-CH_{2}OH	β,β	NMe	2.2	26	no data
RTI-99	Br	-CH_{2}OH	β,β	NMe	1.49	51	no data
RTI-93	Cl	-CH_{2}OH	β,β	NMe	1.53	204	43.8
RTI-105	Cl	-CH_{2}OAc	β,β	NMe	1.60	143	127
RTI-123	Cl	-CH_{2}OBz	β,β	NMe	1.78	3.53	393
RTI-145	Cl	-CH_{2}OCO_{2}Me	β,β	NMe	9.60	2.93	1.48

=== 2-Alkane/Alkene ===
2-Alkane/Alkene-3-Phenyltropanes
Structure	Singh's #	R	X	DAT mazindol displacement	DA uptake	5-HT Uptake	Selectivity DA uptake/DAT binding
	11a WIN 35062-2			89.4	53.7	186	0.6
	11c			0.83 ± 00.7	28.5 ± 0.9	—	34.3
	11f			5.76	6.92	23.2	1.2
	41a	(CH_{2})_{2}CH_{3}	H	12.2	6.89	86.8	0.6
	41b	(CH_{2})_{3}C_{6}H_{5}	H	16 ± 2^{a}	43 ± 13^{b}	—	2.7
	42	(CH_{2})_{2}CH_{3}	F	5.28	1.99	21.7	0.4
	43a	CH=CH_{2}	Cl	0.59 ± 0.15	2.47 ± 0.5	—	4.2
	43b	E-CH=CHCl	Cl	0.42 ± 0.04	1.13 ± 0.27	—	2.7
	43c	Z-CH=CHCl	Cl	0.22 ± 0.02	0.88 ± 0.05	—	4.0
	43d	E-CH=CHC_{6}H_{5}	Cl	0.31 ± 0.04	0.66 ± 0.01	—	2.1
	43e	Z-CH=CHC_{6}H_{5}	Cl	0.14 ± 0.07	0.31 ± 0.09	—	2.2
	43f	CH_{2}CH_{3}	Cl	2.17 ± 0.20	2.35 ± 0.52	—	1.1
	43 g	(CH_{2})_{2}CH_{3}	Cl	0.94 ± 0.08	1.08 ± 0.05	—	1.1
	43h	(CH_{2})_{3}CH_{3}	Cl	1.21 ± 0.18	0.84 ± 0.05	—	0.7
	43i	(CH_{2})_{5}CH_{3}	Cl	156 ± 15	271 ± 3	—	1.7
	43j	(CH_{2})_{2}C_{6}H_{5}	Cl	1.43 ± 0.03	1.54 ± 0.08	—	1.0
	44a	(CH_{2})_{2}CH_{3}	CH_{3}	1.57	1.10	10.3	0.7
	44b	(CH_{2})_{3}CH_{3}	CH_{3}	1.82	1.31	15.1	0.7
	45	(CH_{2})_{2}CH_{3}	H	74.9	30.2	389	0.4
	46	(CH_{2})_{2}CH_{3}	F	21.1	12.1	99.6	0.6
	47a	(CH_{2})_{2}CH_{3}	CH_{3}	8.91	11.8	50.1	1.3
	47b	(CH_{2})_{3}CH_{3}	CH_{3}	11.4	10.1	51.0	0.9

^{a}K_{i} value for displacement of WIN 35428.
^{b}IC_{50} value.

Compound 48

para-hydro

para-chloro

=== Irreversible covalent (cf. ionic) C2 ligands ===
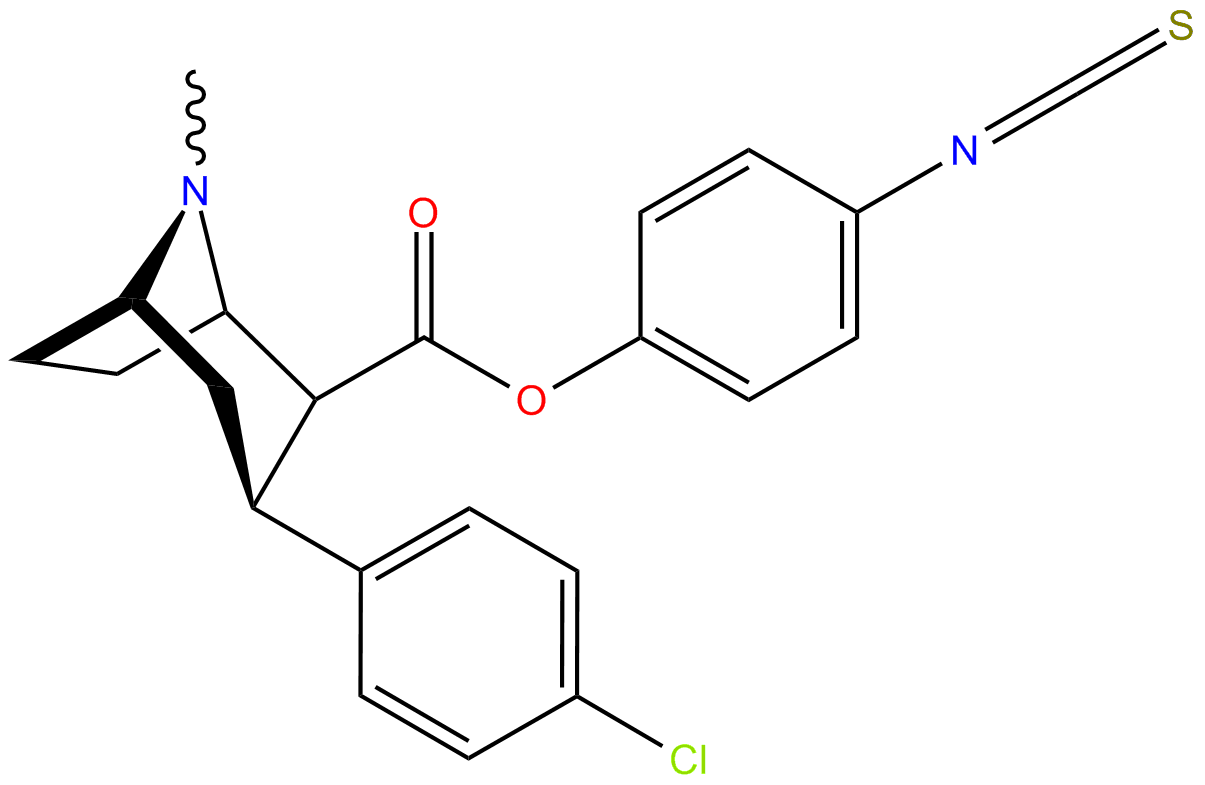
Irreversible (phenylisothiocyanate) binding ligand (Murthy, V.; Martin, T. J.; Kim, S.; Davies, H. M. L.; Childers, S. R. (2008). "In Vivo Characterization of a Novel Phenylisothiocyanate Tropane Analog at Monoamine Transporters in Rat Brain". Journal of Pharmacology and Experimental Therapeutics. 326 (2): 587–595. doi:10.1124/jpet.108.138842. PMID 18492949. S2CID 5996473.) RTI-76: 4′-isothiocyanatophenyl (1R,2S,3S,5S)-3-(4-chlorophenyl)-8-methyl-8-azabicyclo[3.2.1]octane-2-carboxylate. Also known as: 3β-(p-chlorophenyl)tropan-2β-carboxylic acid p-isothiocyanatophenylmethyl ester.

==== C2 Acyl, N8 phenylisothiocyanate ====
HD-205 (Murthy et al., 2007)

Note the contrast to the phenylisothiocyanate covalent binding site locations as compared to the one on p-Isococ, a non-phenyltropane cocaine analogue.

=== Benztropine based (C2-position hetero-substituted) phenyltropanes ===
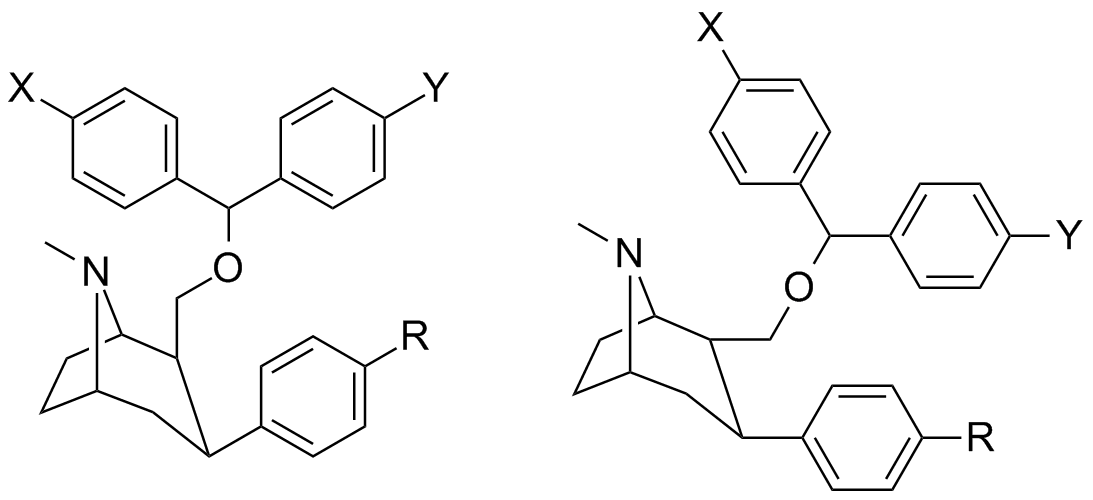
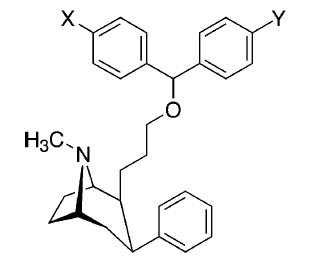

2-(Diarylmethoxymethyl)-3β-aryltropanes & 2β-[3-(Diarylmethoxy)propyl]-3β-aryltropanes.
Structure	Compound	R	X	Y	[^{3}H]WIN 35,428 @ DAT K_{i} (nM)	[^{3}H]Citalopram @ SERT K_{i} (nM)	[^{3}H]Nisoxetine @ NET K_{i} (nM)	[^{3}H]Pirenzepine @ M_{1} K_{i} (nM)
	9a	CH_{3}	H	H	34 ± 2	121 ± 19	684 ± 100	10,600 ± 1,100
	9b	F	H	H	49 ± 12	—	—	—
	9c	Cl	H	H	52 ± 2.1	147 ± 8	1,190 ± 72	11,000 ± 1,290
	9d	CH_{3}	Cl	H	80 ± 9	443 ± 60	4,400 ± 238	31,600 ± 4,300
	9e	F	Cl	H	112 ± 11	—	—	—
	9f	Cl	Cl	H	76 ± 7	462 ± 36	2,056 ± 236	39,900 ± 5,050
	9g	CH_{3}	F	F	62 ± 7	233 ± 24	1,830 ± 177	15,500 ± 1,400
	9h	F	F	F	63 ± 13	—	—	—
	9i	Cl	F	F	99 ± 18	245 ± 16	2,890 ± 222	16,300 ± 1,300
	10a	CH_{3}	H	H	455 ± 36	530 ± 72	2,609 ± 195	12,600 ± 1,790
	10c	Cl	H	H	478 ± 72	408 ± 16	3,998 ± 256	11,500 ± 1,720
	10d	CH_{3}	Cl	H	937 ± 84	1,001 ± 109	22,500 ± 2,821	18,200 ± 2,600
	10f	Cl	Cl	H	553 ± 106	1,293 ± 40	5,600 ± 183	9,600 ± 600
	10g	CH_{3}	F	F	690 ± 76	786 ± 67	16,000 ± 637	9,700 ± 900
	10i	Cl	F	F	250 ± 40	724 ± 100	52,300 ± 13,600	9,930 ± 1,090
	12a	H	H	H	139 ± 15	61 ± 9	207 ± 30	7,970 ± 631
	12b	H	Cl	H	261 ± 19	45 ± 3	—	24,600 ± 2,930
	12c	H	F	F	60 ± 7	—	—	—

=== F&B series (Biotin side-chains etc.) ===
One patent claims a series of compounds with biotin-related sidechains are pesticides.

Images of the biotin C2 side-chained phenyltropanes, click to

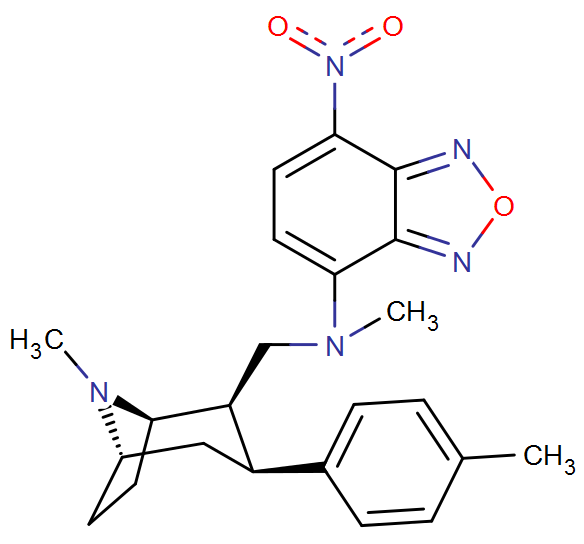
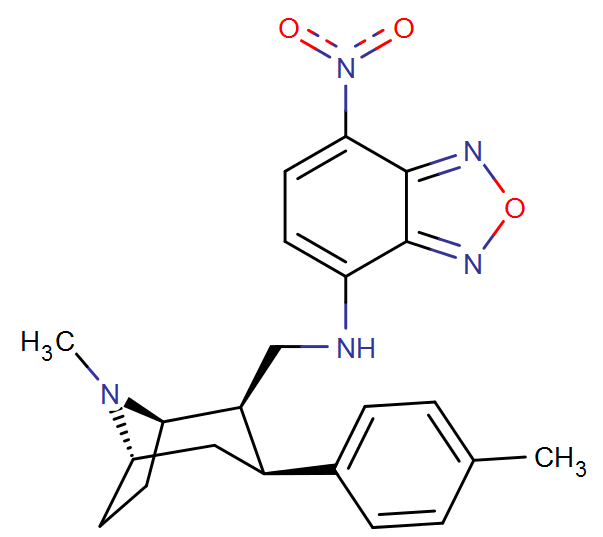
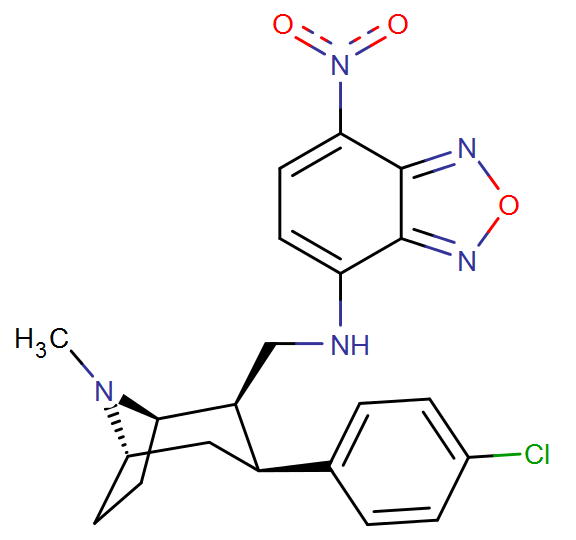
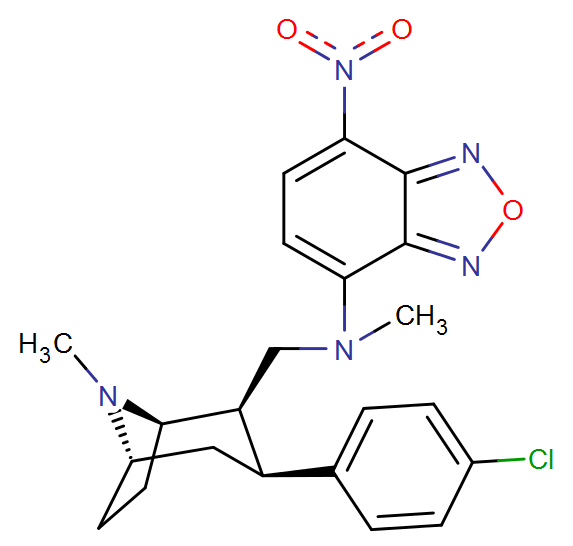
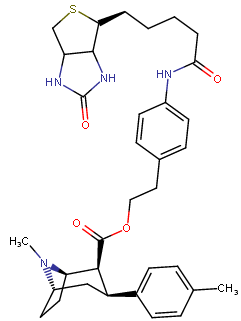
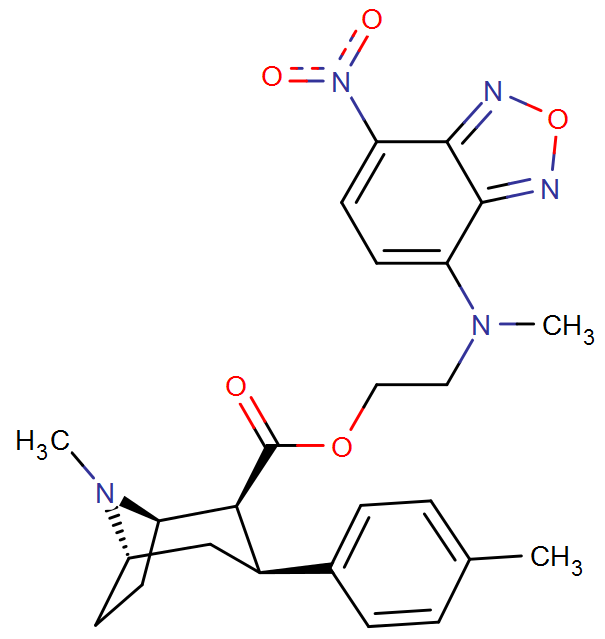
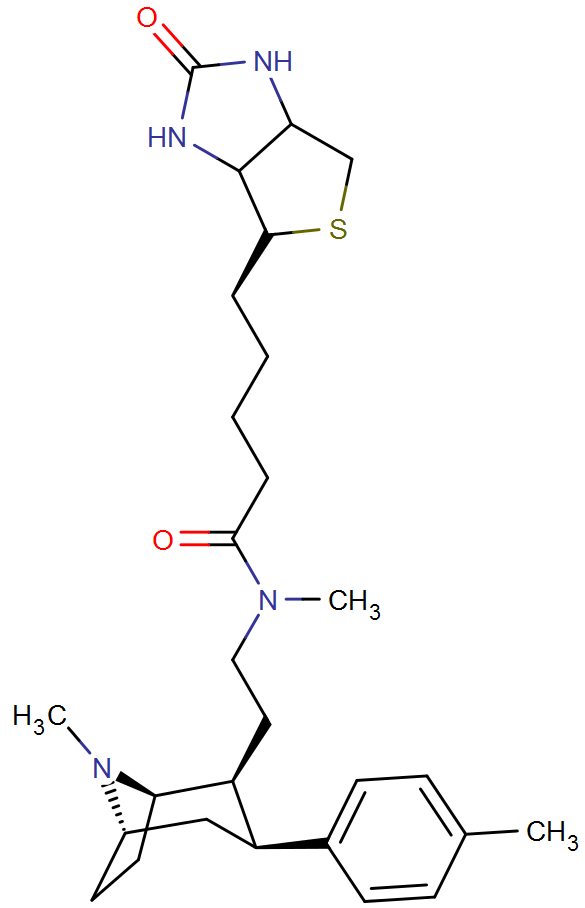
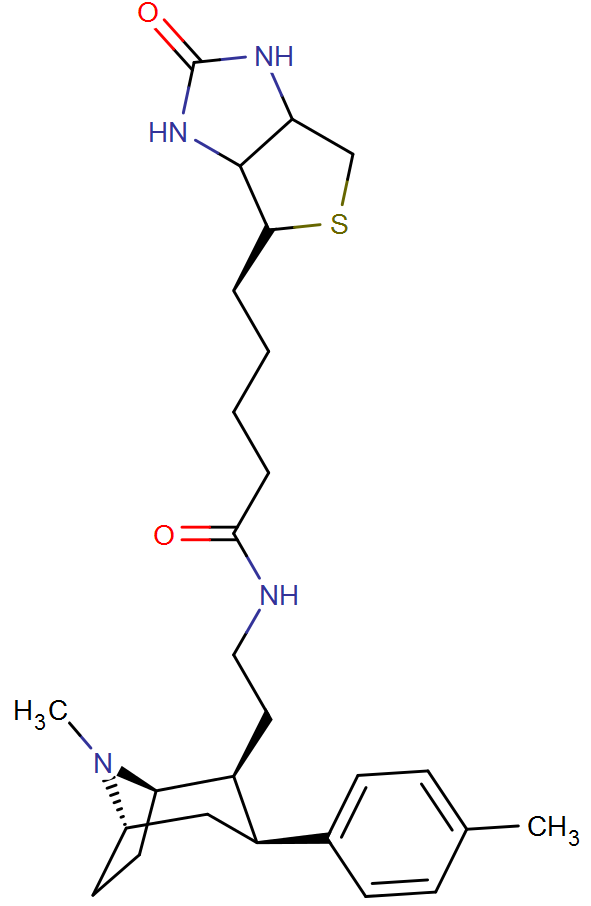
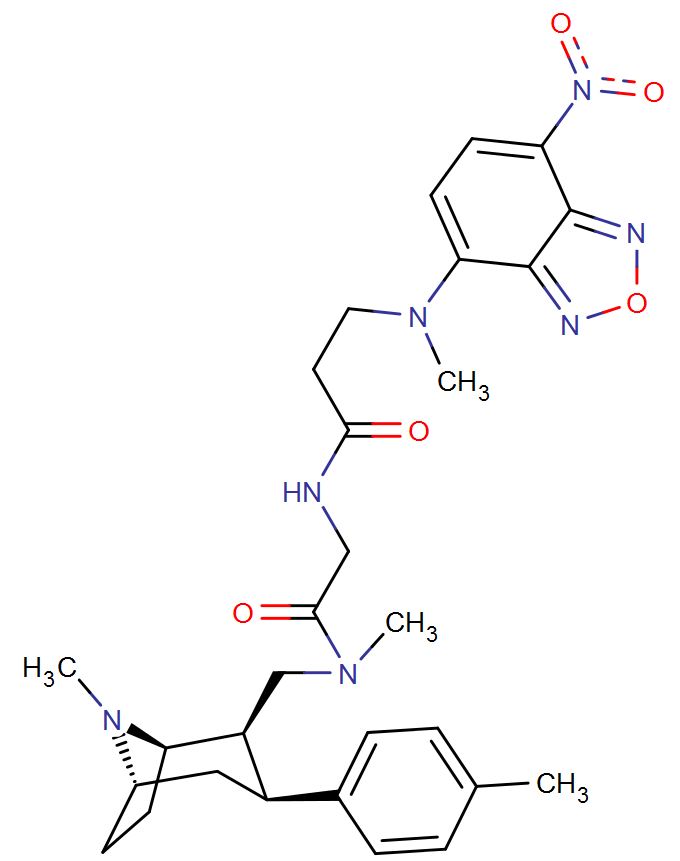
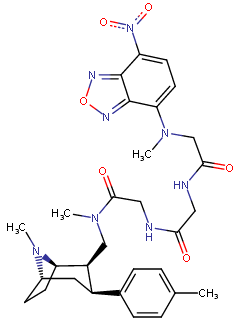
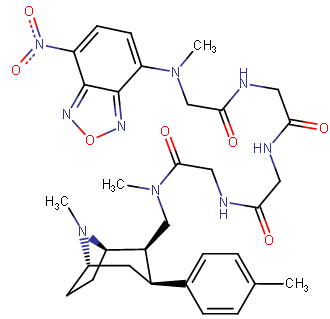
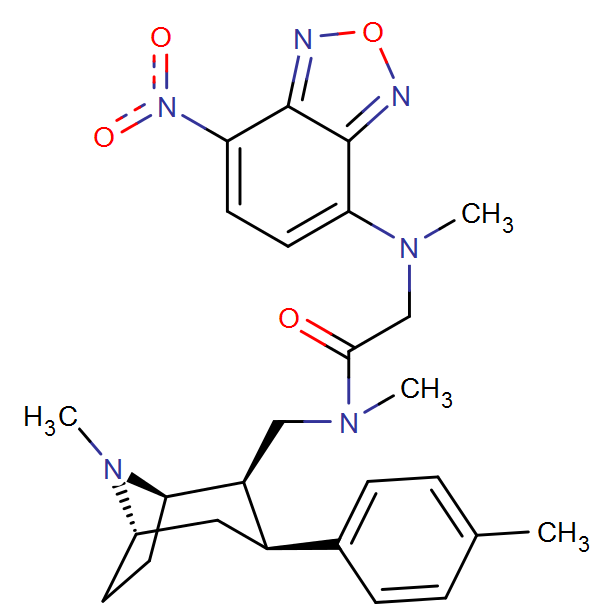
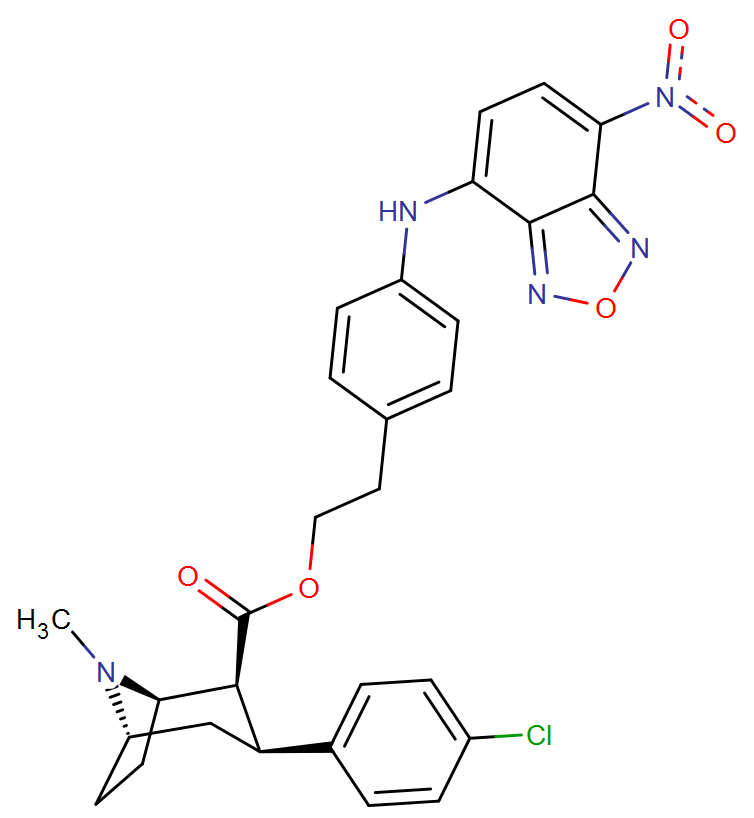
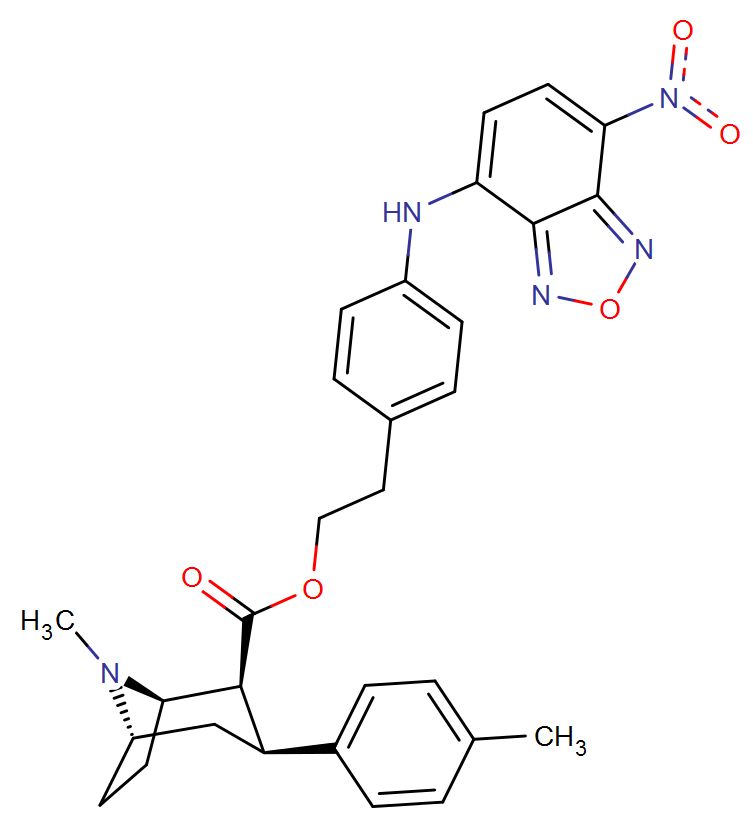

Structure	Code	para-X	C2-Tropane Position	config	DA	NE	5-HT
	—	H	F1	β,β	—	—	—
	RTI-224	Me	F1^{c}	β,β	4.49	—	155.6
	RTI-233	Me	F2	β,β	4.38	516	73.6
	RTI-235	Me	F3^{d}	β,β	1.75	402	72.4
	—	—	F3	β,β	—	—	—
	RTI-236	Me	B1^{d}	β,β	1.63	86.8	138
	RTI-237	Me	B2^{d}	β,β	7.27	258	363
	RTI-244	Me	B3^{d}	β,β	15.6	1809	33.7
	RTI-245	Cl	F4^{c}	β,β	77.3	—	—
	RTI-246	Me	F4^{c}	β,β	50.3	3000	—
	—	—	F5	β,β	—	—	—
	RTI-248	Cl	F6^{c}	β,β	9.73	4674	6.96
	RTI-249	Cl	F1^{c}	β,β	8.32	5023	81.6
	RTI-266	Me	F2	β,β	4.80	836	842
	RTI-267	Me	F7 wrong	β,β	2.52	324	455
	RTI-268	Me	F7 right	β,β	3.89	1014	382
	RTI-269	Me	F8	β,β	5.55	788	986

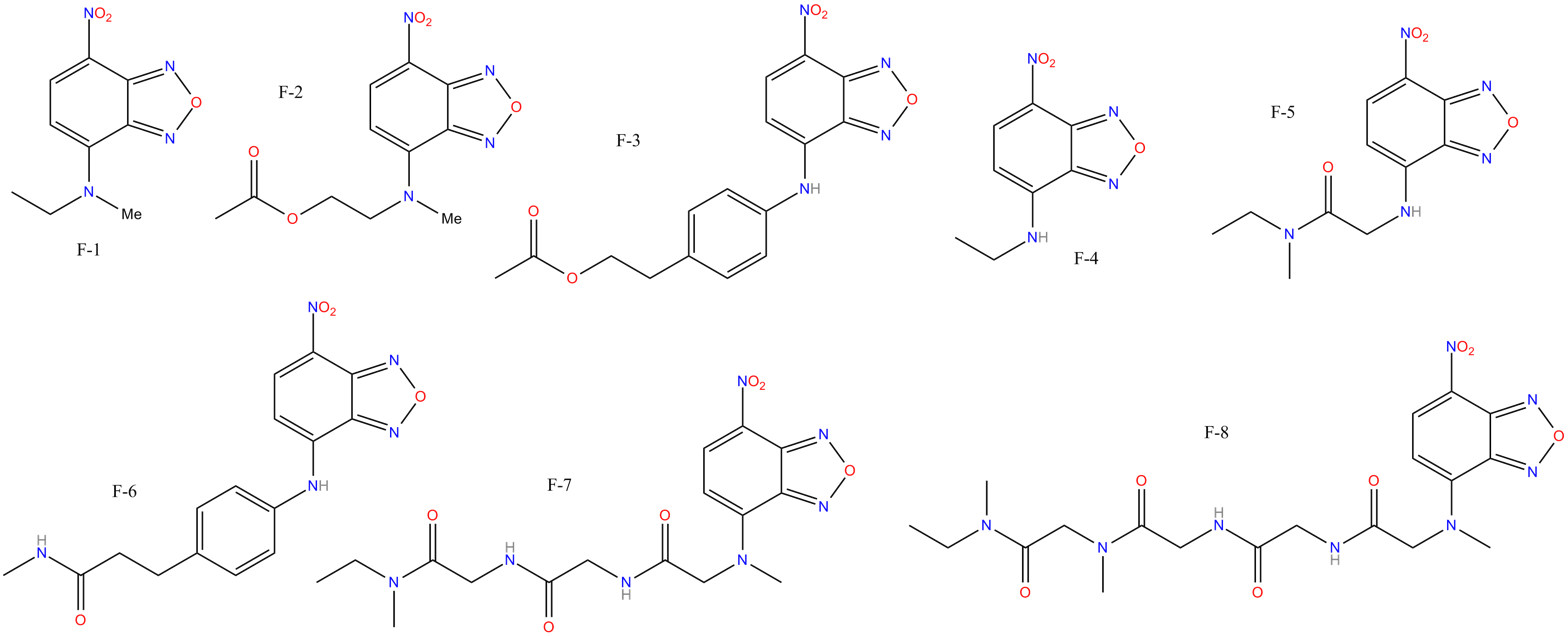
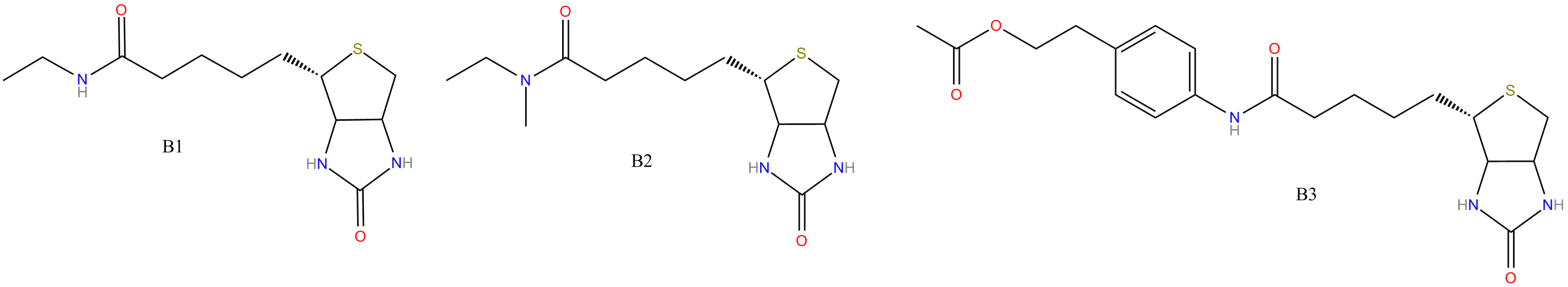

=== Miscellany (i.e. Misc./Miscellaneous) C2-substituents ===

Structure	Code	X	2 Position	config	8	DA	5-HT	NE
	RTI-102	I	CO_{2}H	β,β	NMe	474	1928	43,400
	RTI-103	Br	CO_{2}H	β,β	NMe	278	3070	17,400
	RTI-104	F	CO_{2}H	β,β	NMe	2744	>100K	>100K
	RTI-108	Cl	-CH_{2}Cl	β,β	NMe	2.64	98	129.8
	RTI-241	Me	-CH_{2}CO_{2}Me	β,β	NMe	1.02	619	124
	RTI-139	Cl	-CH_{3}	β,β	NMe	1.67	85	57
	RTI-161	Cl	-C≡N	β,β	NMe	13.1	1887	2516
	RTI-230	Cl	H_{3}C–C=CH_{2}	β,β	NMe	1.28	57	141
	RTI-240	Cl	-CHMe_{2}	β,β	NMe	1.38	38.4	84.5
	RTI-145	Cl	-CH_{2}OCO_{2}Me	β,β	NMe	9.60	2,932	1,478
	RTI-158	Me	-C≡N	β,β	NMe	57	5095	1624
	RTI-131	Me	-CH_{2}NH_{2}	β,β	NMe	10.5	855	120
	RTI-164	Me	-CH_{2}NHMe	β,β	NMe	13.6	2246	280
	RTI-132	Me	-CH_{2}NMe_{2}	β,β	NMe	3.48	206	137
	RTI-239	Me	-CHMe_{2}	β,β	NMe	0.61	114	35.6
	RTI-338	Et	-CO_{2}CH_{2}Ph	β,β	NMe	1104	7.41	3366
	RTI-348	H	-Ph	β,β	NMe	28.2	>34,000	2670

== C2-truncated/descarboxyl (non-ecgonine w/o 2-position-replacement tropanes) ==
=== Aryl-Tropenes ===
WO 2004113297, Peters, Dan; Olsen, Gunnar M. & Nielsen, Elsebet Oestergaard et al., "Aza-ring derivatives and their use as monoamine neurotransmitter re-uptake inhibitors", published 2004-12-29, assigned to NeuroSearch AS

Test compound	DA-uptake IC_{50}(μM)	NA-uptake IC_{50}(μM)	5-HT-uptake IC_{50}(μM)
(+)-3-(4-Chlorophenyl)-8-H-aza-bicyclo[3.2.1]oct-2-ene	0.26	0.028	0.010
(+)-3-Napthalen-2-yl-8-azabicyclo[3.2.1]oct-2-ene	0.058	0.013	0.00034
(–)-8-Methyl-3-(naphthalen-2-yl)-8-azabicylo[3.2.1]oct-2-ene	0.034	0.018	0.00023

US 0

8-AZABICYCLO[3.2.1]OCT-2-ENE DERIVATIVES
Test Compound	DA uptake IC_{50}(μM)	NE uptake IC_{50}(μM)	5-HT uptake IC_{50}(μM)
(±)-3-(3,4-Dichlorophenyl)-8-methyl-8-azabicyclo[3.2.1]oct-2-ene	0.079	0.026	0.0047

U.S. patent 2,001,047,028

Test Compound	DA uptake IC_{50}(μM)	NE uptake IC_{50}(μM)	5-HT uptake IC_{50}(μM)
(±)-3-(4-cyanophenyl)-8-methyl-8-azabicyclo[3.2.1]oct-2-ene	18	4.9	0.047
(±)-3-(4-nitrophenyl)-8-methyl-8-azabicyclo[3.2.1]oct-2-ene	1.5	0.5	0.016
(±)-3-(4-trifluoromethoxyphenyl)-8-methyl-8-azabicyclo[3.2.1]oct-2-ene	22.00	8.00	0.0036

== Enantioselective nonstandard configurations (non-2β-,3β-) ==
=== β,α Stereochemistry ===
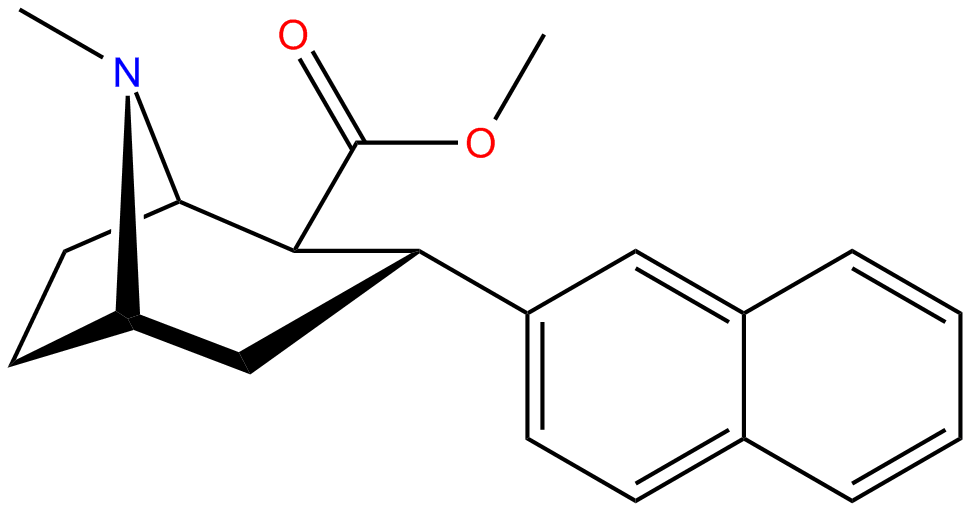

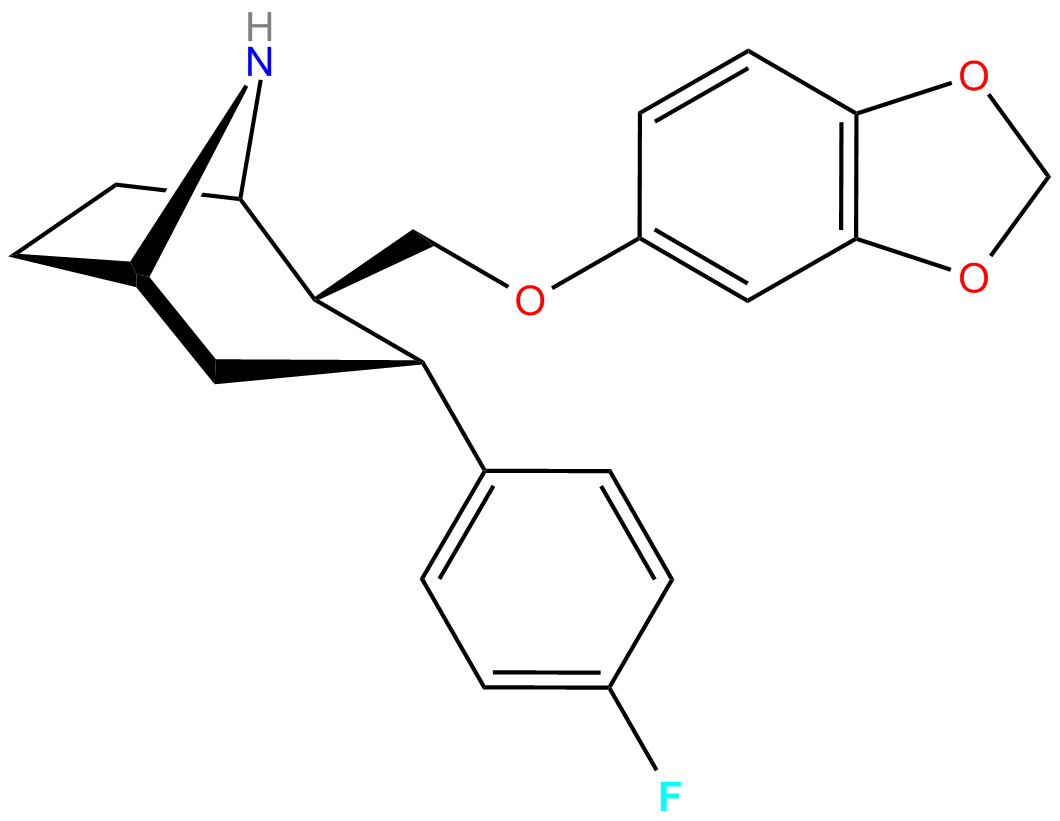

Structure	Compound (RTI #) (S. Singh's #)	X	2 Group	config	8	DAT IC_{50} (nM) [^{3}H]WIN 35428	5-HTT IC_{50} (nM) [^{3}H]paroxetine	NET IC_{50} (nM) [^{3}H]nisoxetine	selectivity 5-HTT/DAT	selectivity NET/DAT
	RTI-140; 20a	H	CO_{2}Me	β,α	NMe	101 ± 16	5,701 ± 721	2,076 ± 285	56.4	20.6
	RTI-352^{ɑ} 20d	I	CO_{2}Me	β,α	NMe	2.86 ± 0.16	64.9 ± 1.97	52.4 ± 4.9	22.8	18.4
	RTI-549	Br	CO_{2}Me	β,α	NMe	—	—	—	—	—
	RTI-319^{b}	3α-2-naphthyl	CO_{2}Me	β,α	NMe	1.1 ± 0.09	11.4 ± 1.3	70.2 ± 6.28	—	—
	RTI-286^{c} 20b	F	CO_{2}Me	β,α	NMe	21 ± 0.57	5062 ± 485	1231 ± 91	241	58.6
	RTI-274^{d}	F	CH_{2}O(3′,4′-MD-phenyl)	β,α	NH	3.96	5.62	14.4	—	—
	RTI-287	Et	CO_{2}Me	β,α	NMe	327	1687	17,819	—	—
	20c	Cl	CO_{2}Me	β,α	NMe	2.4 ± 0.2	998 ± 120	60.1 ± 2.4	416	25.0
	20e	Me	CO_{2}Me	β,α	NMe	10.2 ± 0.08	4250 ± 422	275 ± 24	417	27.0
		Bn	CO_{2}Me	β,α	NMe	—	—	—	—	—

^{ɑ}U.S. patent 6,358,492^{b}U.S. patent 7,011,813^{c}U.S. patent 7,011,813^{d}U.S. patent 7,291,737

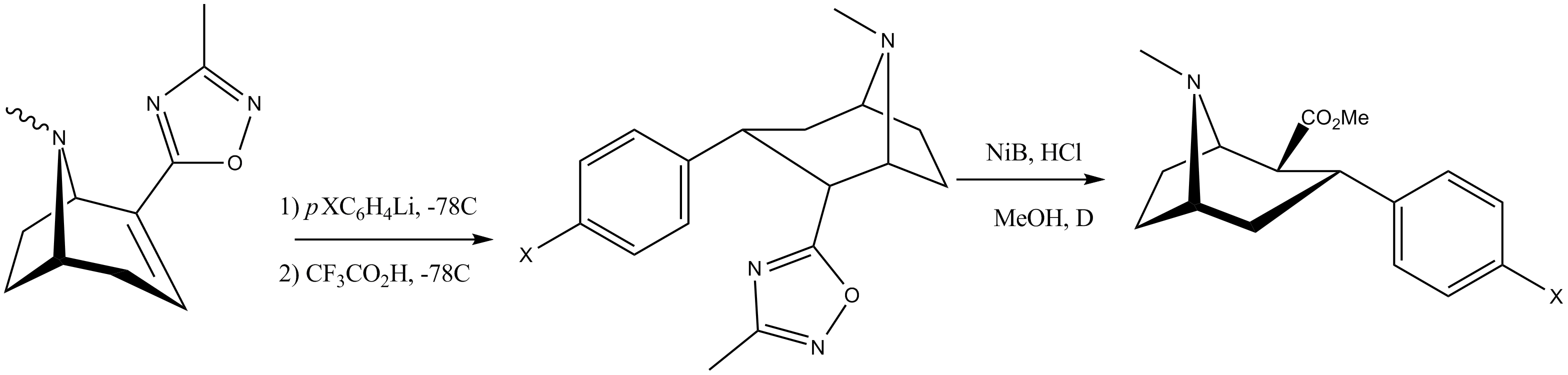

=== α,β Stereochemistry ===
CA 2112084

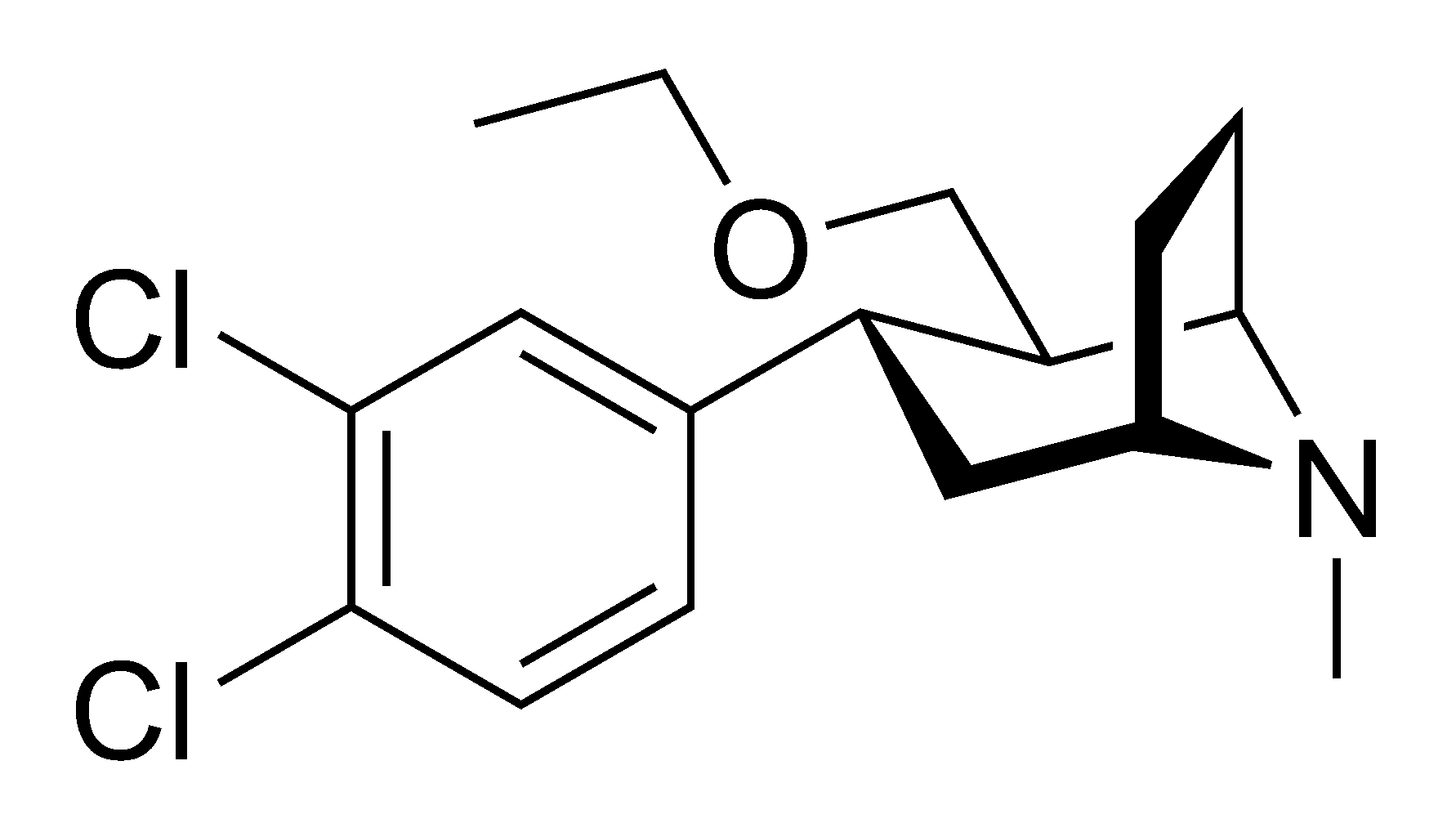

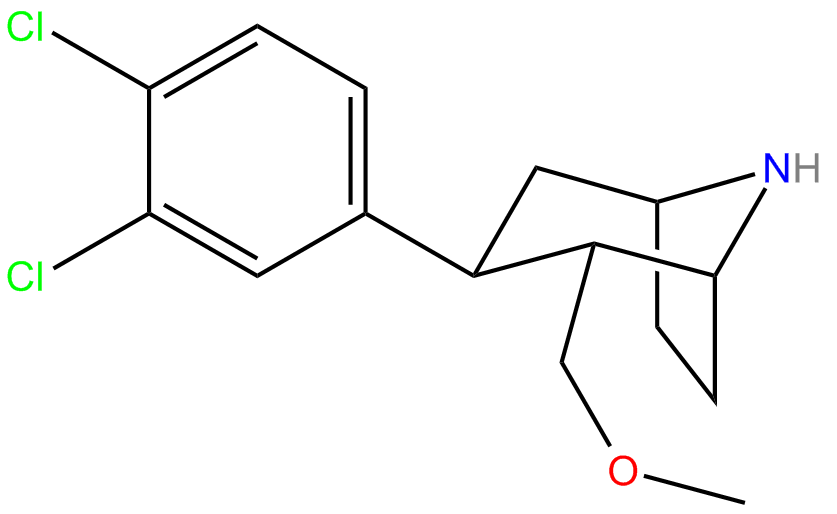

Compound	DA (μM)	M.E.D. (mg/kg)	Dose (mg/kg)	Activity	Activity
(2R,3S)-2-(4-chlorophenoxymethyl)-8-methyl-3-(3-chlorophenyl)-8-azabicyclo[3.2.1]octane	0.39	<1	50	0	0
(2R,3S)-2-(carboxymethyl)-8-methyl-3-(2-naphthyl)-8-azabicyclo[3.2.1]octane	0.1	1	25	0	0
(2R,3S)-2-(carboxymethyl)-8-methyl-3-(3,4-dichlorophenyl)-8-azabicyclo[3.2.1]octane	0.016	0.25	50	+	+++

==== di-chloro; para- & meta- in tandem (α,β configured phenyltropanes) ====
U.S. patent 2,001,047,028

Compound	X	2 Group	config	8	DA	5-HT	NE
Brasofensine	Cl_{2}	methyl aldoxime	α,β	NMe	—	—	—
Tesofensine	Cl_{2}	ethoxymethyl	α,β	NMe	65	11	1.7
NS-2359 (GSK-372,475)	Cl_{2}	Methoxymethyl	α,β	NH	—	—	—

==== fumaric acid salts (of α,β configured phenyltropanes) ====
WO 2004072075, Peters, Dan; Nielsen, Elsebet Oestergaard & Olsen, Gunnar M. et al., "Novel 8-aza-bicyclo[3.2.1]octane derivatives and their use as monoamine neurotransmitter re-uptake inhibitors", published 2004-08-26, assigned to NeuroSearch AS

Test Compound	DA uptake IC_{50}(μM)	NE uptake IC_{50}(μM)	5-HT uptake IC_{50}(μM)
(2R,3S)-2-(2,3-dichlorophenoxymethyl)-8-methyl-3-(3-chlorophenyl)-8-azabicyclo[3.2.1]octane fumaric acid salt	0.062	0.035	0.00072
(2R,3S)-2-(Naphthaleneoxymethane)-8-methyl-3-(3-chlorophenyl)-8-azabicyclo[3.2.1]octane fumaric acid salt	0.062	0.15	0.0063
(2R,3S)-2-(2,3-dichlorophenoxymethyl)-8-H-3-(3-chlorophenyl)-8-azabicyclo[3.2.1]octane fumaric acid salt	0.10	0.048	0.0062
(2R,3S)-2-(Naphthlyloxymethane)-8-H-3-(3-chlorophenyl)-8-azabicyclo[3.2.1]octane fumaric acid salt	0.088	0.051	0.013

== Arene equivalent alterations ==
=== η^{6}-3β-(transition metal complexed phenyl)tropanes ===
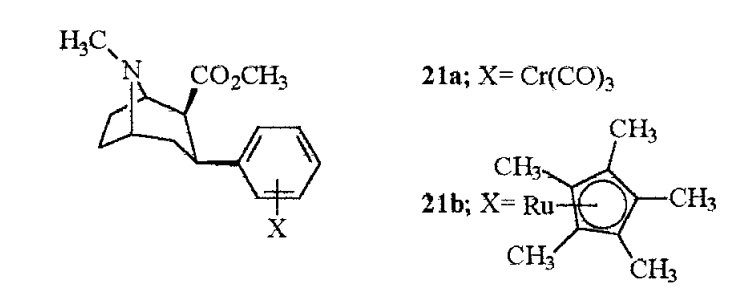
×–substitution image of both the chromium & ruthenium benzene pi-symmetry facilitating PTs. 21b can be prepared from ferrocenes and perrhenate by a double ligand transfer (DLT) reaction.

Unlike metal complexed PTs created with the intention of making useful radioligands, 21a & 21b were produced seeing as their η^{6}-coordinated moiety dramatically altered the electronic character and reactivity of the benzene ring, as well as such a change adding asymmetrical molecular volume to the otherwise planar arene ring unit of the molecule. (cf. the Dewar–Chatt–Duncanson model). In addition the planar dimension of the transition metal stacked arene becomes delocalized (cf. Bloom and Wheeler.).

21a was twice as potent as both cocaine and troparil in displacement of β-CFT, as well as displaying high & low affinity K_{i} values in the same manner as those two compounds. Whereas its inhibition of DA uptake showed it as comparably equipotent to cocaine & troparil. 21b by contrast had a one hundredfold decrease in high-affinity site binding compared to cocaine and a potency 10× less for inhibiting DA uptake. Attesting these as true examples relating useful effective applications for bioorganometallic chemistry.

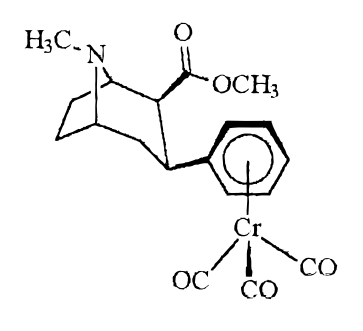
Tricarbonyl-3β-chromium containing phenyltropane, having roughly twice the strength K_{i} affinity as parent compound at same mean affect.

The discrepancy in binding for the two benzene metal chelates is assumed to be due to electrostatic differences rather than their respective size difference. The solid cone angles, measured by the steric parameter (i.e. θ) is θ=131° for Cr(CO)_{3} whereas Cp*Ru was θ=187° or only 30% larger. The tricarbonyl moiety being considered equivalent to the cyclopenta dienyl (Cp) ligand.

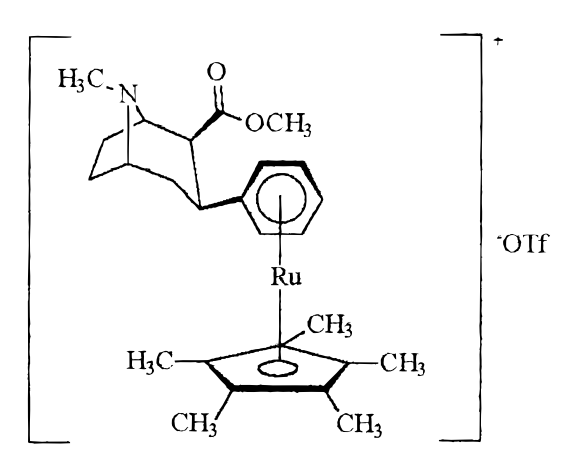
Diagram indicating the triflate, in bracket, superimposed as a direct connection between the η^{6} benzene containing its transition metal fixed upon the η^{5}-penta-methyl (five-methyls) cyclopenta-dienyl (five sided ring) alongside the benzene in three dimension.

Displacement of Receptor-Bound [^{3}H]WIN 35428 and Inhibition of [^{3}H]DA Uptake by Transition Metal Complexes of 3β-Phenyltropanes
Structure	Compound # (S. Singh) Systematic name	K_{i} (nM)^{ɑ}	IC_{50} (nM)	selectivity binding/uptake
	21a^{c}	17 ± 15^{b} 224 ± 83	418	24.6
	21b^{d}	2280 ± 183	3890	1.7
Cocaine		32 ± 5; 388 ±221	405	12.6
Troparil (11a)		33 ± 17; 314 ± 222	373	11.3

- ^{ɑ}The binding data fit a two-site model better than a one-site model
- ^{b}The K_{i} value for the one-site model was 124 ± 10 nM
- ^{c}IUPAC: [η^{6}-(2β-carbomethoxy-3β-phenyl)tropane]tricarbonylchromium
- ^{d}IUPAC: [η^{5}-(pentamethylcyclopentadienyl)]-[η^{6}-(2β-carbomethoxy-3β-phenyl)tropane]ruthenium-(II) triflate

=== 3-(2-thiophene) and 3-(2-furan) ===
U.S. patent 7,247,643

Code	Compound	DA (μM)	NE (μM)	5-HT (μM)
1	(2R,3S)-2-(2,3-Dichlorophenoxymethyl)-8-methyl-3-(2-thienyl)-8-aza-bicyclo[3.2.1]octanefumaric acid salt	0.30	0.0019	0.00052
2	(2R,3S)-2-(1-Naphthyloxymethyl)-8-methyl-3-(2-thienyl)-8-aza-bicyclo-[3.2.1]octane fumaric acid salt	0.36	0.0036	0.00042
3	(2R,3S)-2-(2,3-Dichlorophenoxymethyl)-8-methyl-3-(2-furanyl)-8-aza-bicyclo-[3.2.1]octane fumaric acid salt	0.31	0.00090	0.00036
4	(2R,3S)-2-(1-Naphthyloxymethyl)-8-methyl-3-(2-furanyl)-8-aza-bicyclo-[3.2.1]octane fumaric acid salt	0.92	0.0030	0.00053
5	(2R,3S)-2-(2,3-Dichlorophenoxymethyl)-8-H-3-(2-thienyl)-8-aza-bicyclo[3.2.1]octane fumaric acid salt	0.074	0.0018	0.00074
6	(2R,3S)-2-(1-Naphthyloxymethyl)-8-H-3-(2-thienyl)-8-aza-bicyclo[3.2.1]octane fumaric acid salt	0.19	0.0016	0.00054

=== Thiophenyltropanes ===
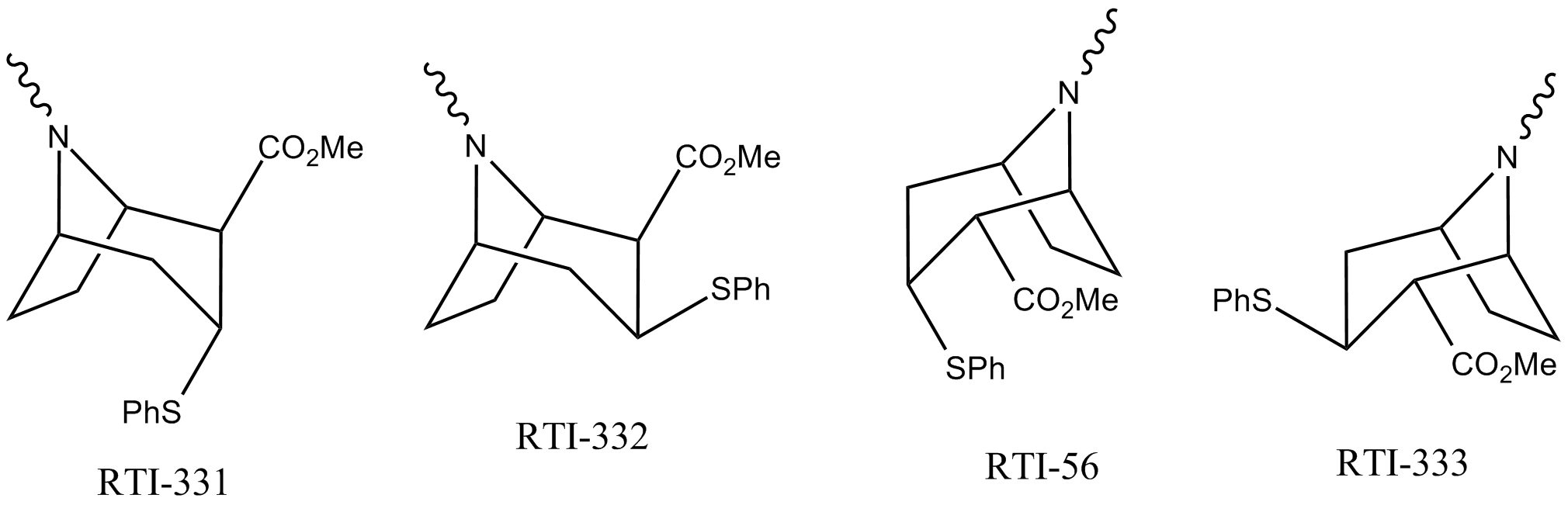

=== Diaryl ===
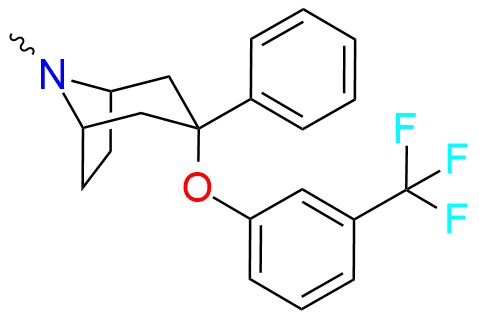
Fluoxetine homologue, also: Hanna et al. (2007)
cf. the paroxetine homologue PTs

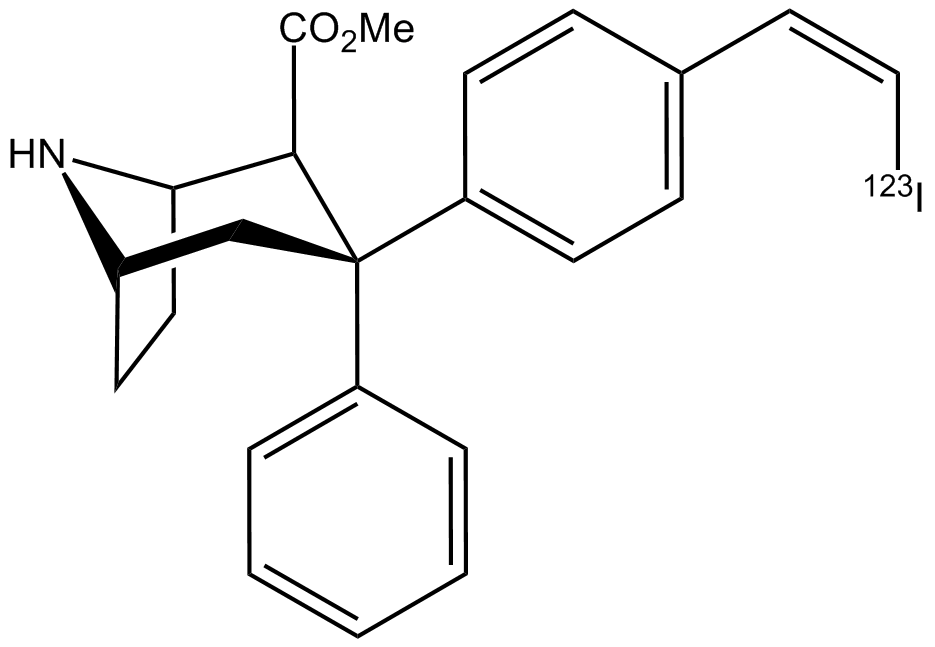
ZIENT:

== 6/7-tropane position substituted ==
=== 2β-carbomethoxy 6/7 substituted ===
6/7-Substituted 2-carbomethoxy-phenyltropanes
Structure	Compound # (S. Singh)	Substitution	DAT (IC_{50} nM) displacement of [H^{3}]WIN 35428	5-HTT (IC_{50} nM) [H^{3}]Citalopram	Selectivity 5-HTT/DAT
	Cocaine	H	65 ± 12	-	-
	103a	3β,2β, 7-OMe; 3′,4′-Cl_{2}	86 ± 4.7	884 ± 100	10.3
	103b	3β,2β, 7-OH; 3′,4′-Cl_{2}	1.42 ± 0.03	28.6 ± 7.8	20.1
	103c	3α,2β, 7-OH; 3′,4′-Cl_{2}	1.19 ± 0.16	1390 ± 56	1168
	104a	3β,2β, 6-OH; 4′-Me	215^{ɑ}	-	-
	104b	3β,2α, 6-OH; 4′-Me	15310^{ɑ}	-	-
	104c	3α,2β, 6-OH; 4′-Me	930^{ɑ}	-	-
	104d	3α,2α, 6-OH; 4′-Me	7860^{ɑ}	-	-

- ^{ɑ}IC_{50} value for displacement of [H^{3}]mazindol. IC_{50} for cocaine 288 nM for displacement of [H^{3}]mazindol

=== 3-butyl 6/7 substituted ===
6/7-Substituted 3-butyl-phenyltropanes
Structure	Compound # (S. Singh)	Substituent	K_{i} nM displacement of [H^{3}]mazindol binding	K_{i} nM [H^{3}]DA uptake	Selectivity uptake/binding
	Cocaine	H	270 ± 0.03	400 ± 20	1.5
	121a	7β-CN	2020 ± 10	710 ± 40	0.3
	121b	6β-CN	3040 ± 480	6030 ± 880	2.0
	121c	7β-SO_{2}Ph	4010 ± 310	8280 ± 1340	2.1
	121d	6β-SO_{2}Ph	4450 ± 430	8270 ± 690	1.8
	121e	7α-OH	830 ± 40	780 ± 60	0.9
	121f	H	100 ± 10	61 ± 10	0.6
	121g	7β-CN	24000 ± 3420	32100 ± 8540	1.3
	121h	6β-CN	11300 ± 1540	26600 ± 3330	2.3
	121i	7β-SO_{2}Ph	7690 ± 2770	7050 ± 450	0.9
	121j	6β-SO_{2}Ph	4190 ± 700	8590 ± 1360	2.0
	121k	7α-SO_{2}Ph	3420 ± 1100	-	-
	121l	7β-SO_{2}Ph, 7α-F	840 ± 260	2520 ± 290	3.0
	121m	7α-F	200 ± 10	680 ± 10	3.4
	121n	7β-F	500 ± 10	550 ± 140	1.1

=== intermediate 6- & 7-position synthesis modified phenyltropanes ===
6/7-synthetic intermediates
Structure	Compound # (S. Singh)	Substituent W	Substituent X	Substituent Y	Substituent Z
	(±)-122a	CN	H	H	H
	(±)-122b	H	H	CH	H
	(±)-122c	H	CH	H	H
	(±)-122d	H	H	H	CH
	(±)-122e	SO_{2}Ph	H	H	H
	(±)-122f	H	H	SO_{2}Ph	H
	(±)-122g	H	SO_{2}Ph	H	H
	(±)-122h	SO_{2}Ph	F	H	H
	(±)-122i	F	SO_{2}Ph	H	H
	(±)-122j	H	H	SO_{2}Ph	F

== 8-tropane (bridgehead) position modified ==
=== Nortropanes (N-demethylated) ===
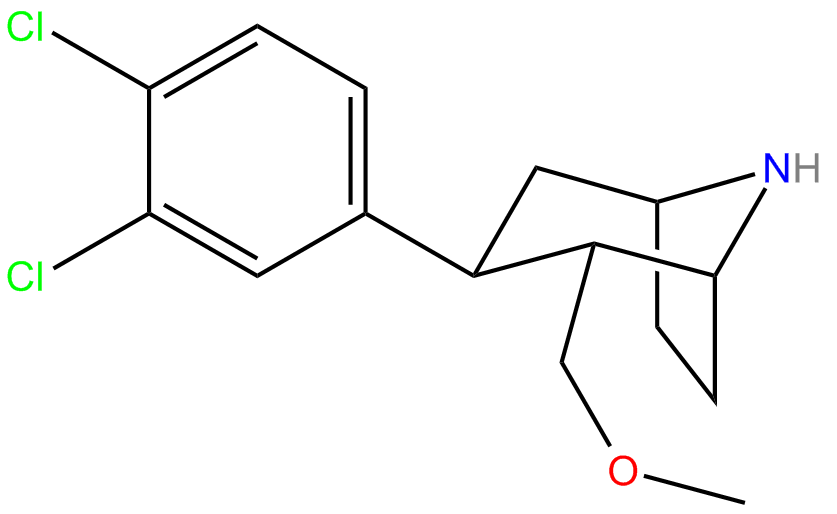
NS2359 (GSK-372,475)

It is well established that electrostatic potential around the para position tends to improve MAT binding. This is believed to also be the case for the meta position, although it is less studied. N-demethylation dramatically potentiates NET and SERT affinity, but the effects of this on DAT binding are insignificant. Of course, this is not always the case. For an interesting exception to this trend, see the Taxil document. There is ample evidence suggesting that N-demethylation of alkaloids occurs naturally in vivo via a biological enzyme. The fact that hydrolysis of the ester leads to inactive metabolites means that this is still the main mode of deactivation for analogues that have an easily metabolised 2-ester substituent. The attached table provides good illustration of the effect of this chemical transformation on MAT binding affinities. N.B. In the case of both nocaine and pethidine, N-demethyl compounds are more toxic and have a decreased seizure threshold.

Selected ββ Nortropanes
Code (S.S. #)	X para^{(unless position otherwise given inline)}	DA	5HT	NE
RTI-142; 75b	F	4.39	68.6	18.8
RTI-98; 75d Nor^{ɑ}-RTI-55	I	0.69	0.36	11.0
RTI-110; 75c	Cl	0.62	4.13	5.45
RTI-173; 75f	Et	49.9	8.13	122
RTI-279; Nor^{ɑ}-RTI-280	para-Me meta-I	5.98 ± 0.48	1.06 ± 0.10	74.3 ± 3.8
RTI-305; Nor^{ɑ}-RTI-360/11y	Ethynyl	1.24 ± 0.11	1.59 ± 0.2	21.8 ± 1.0
RTI-307; Nor^{ɑ}-RTI-281/11z	Propynyl	6.11 ± 0.67	3.16 ± 0.33	115.6 ± 5.1
RTI-309; Nor^{ɑ}-11t	Vinyl	1.73 ± 0.05	2.25 ± 0.17	14.9 ± 1.18
RTI-330; Nor^{ɑ}-11s	Isopropyl	310.2 ± 21	15.1 ± 0.97	—
RTI-353	para-Et meta-I	330.54 ± 17.12	0.69 ± 0.07	148.4 ± 9.15

^{ɑ}The N-demethylated variant of (i.e. compound code-name after dash)

N-demethylating various β,β p-HC-phenyltropanes
N-Me compound code# → N-demethylated derivative compound code #	para-X	[^{3}H]Paroxetine	[^{3}H]WIN 35,428	[^{3}H]Nisoxetine
11 g→75f	Ethyl	28.4 → 8.13	55 → 49.9	4,029 → 122
11t→75i	Vinyl	9.5 → 2.25	1.24 → 1.73	78 → 14.9
11y→75n	Ethynyl	4.4 → 1.59	1.2 → 1.24	83.2 → 21.8
11r→75 g	1-Propyl	70.4 → 26	68.5 → 212	3,920 → 532
11v→75k	trans-propenyl	11.4 → 1.3	5.29 → 28.6	1,590 → 54
11w→75l	cis-propenyl	7.09 → 1.15	15 → 31.6	2,800 → 147
11x→75 m	Allyl	28.4 → 6.2	32.8 → 56.5	2,480 → 89.7
11z→75o	1-Propynyl	15.7 → 3.16	2.37 → 6.11	820 → 116
11s→75h	i-Propyl	191 → 15.1	597 → 310	75,000 → ?
11u→75j	2-Propenyl	3.13 → 0.6	14.4 → 23	1,330? → 144

N-Demethylating phenyltropanes to find a NRI
Isomer	4′	3′	NE	DA	5HT
β,β	Me	H	60 → 7.2	1.7 → 0.84	240 → 135
β,β	F	H	835 → 18.8	15.7 → 4.4	760 → 68.6
β,β	Cl	H	37 → 5.45	1.12 → 0.62	45 → 4.13
β,α	Me	H	270 → 9	10.2 → 33.6	4250 → 500
β,α	F	H	1200 → 9.8	21 → 32.6	5060 → 92.4
β,α	Cl	H	60 → 5.41	2.4 → 3.1	998 → 53.3
β,α	F	Me	148 → 4.23	13.7 → 9.38	1161 → 69.8
β,α	Me	F	44.7 → 0.86	7.38 → 9	1150 → 97.4

"Interest in NET selective drugs continues as evidenced by the development of atomoxetine, manifaxine, and reboxetine as new NET selective compounds for treating ADHD and other CNS disorders such as depression" (FIC, et al. 2005).

N-norphenyltropanes
Structure	Short Name (S. Singh)	Para-X	DAT [^{3}H]WIN 35428 IC_{50} (nM)	5-HTT [^{3}H]Paroxetine IC_{50} (nM)	NET [^{3}H]Nisoxetine IC_{50} (nM)	Selectivity 5-HTT/DAT	Selectivity NET/DAT
	Norcocaine	H	206 ± 29	127 ± 13	139 ± 9	0.6	0.7
	75a	H	30.8 ± 2.3	156 ± 8	84.5 ± 7.5	5.1	2.7
	75b	F	4.39 ± 0.20	68.6 ± 2.0	18.8 ± 0.7	15.6	4.3
	75c	Cl	0.62 ± 0.09	4.13 ± 0.62	5.45 ± 0.21	6.7	8.8
	75d	I	0.69 ± 0.2	0.36 ± 0.05	7.54 ± 3.19	0.5	10.9
	75e	para-I & 2β-CO_{2}CH(CH_{3})_{2}	1.06 ± 0.12	3.59 ± 0.27	132 ± 5	3.4	124
	75f	C_{2}H_{5}	49.9 ± 7.3	8.13 ± 0.30	122 ± 12	0.2	2.4
	75g	n-C_{3}H_{7}	212 ± 17	26 ± 1.3	532 ± 8.1	0.1	2.5
	75h	CH(CH_{3})_{2}	310 ± 21	15.1 ± 0.97	-	0.05	-
	75i	CH=CH_{2}	1.73 ± 0.05	2.25 ± 0.17	14.9 ± 1.18	1.3	8.6
	75j	C-CH_{3} ║ CH_{2}	23 ± 0.9	0.6 ± 0.06	144 ± 12	0.03	6.3
	75k	trans-CH=CHCH_{3}	28.6 ± 3.1	1.3 ± 0.1	54 ± 16	0.04	1.9
	75l	cis-CH=CHCH_{3}	31.6 ± 2.2	1.15 ± 0.1	147 ± 4.3	0.04	4.6
	75m	CH_{2}CH=CH_{2}	56.5 ± 56	6.2 ± 0.3	89.7 ± 9.6	0.1	1.6
	75n	CH≡CH	1.24 ± 0.11	1.59 ± 0.2	21.8 ± 1.0	1.3	17.6
	75o	CH≡CCH_{3}	6.11 ± 0.67	3.16 ± 0.33	116 ± 5.1	0.5	19.0
	75p^{ɑ}	3,4-Cl_{2}	0.66 ± 0.24	1.4^{b}	-	2.1	-

^{ɑ}These values determined in Cynomolgus monkey caudate-putamen ^{b}The radioligand used for 5-HTT was [^{3}H]citalopram

2β-Propanoyl-N-norphenyltropanes
Compound Structure	Short Name (S. Singh)	DAT [^{125}I]RTI-55 IC_{50} (nM)	5-HTT [^{3}H]Paroxetine K_{i} (nM)	NET [^{3}H]Nisoxetine K_{i} (nM)	Selectivity 5-HTT/DAT	Selectivity NET/DAT
	79a	0.07 ± 0.01	0.22 ± 0.16	2.0 ± 0.09	3.1	28.6
	79b	4.7 ± 0.58	19 ± 1.4	5.5 ± 2.0	4.0	1.2
	79c	380 ± 110	5.3 ± 1.0	3400 ± 270	0.01	8.9
	79d	190 ± 17	150 ± 50	5100 ± 220	0.8	26.8
	79e	490 ± 120	85 ± 16	4300 ± 1100	0.1	8.8
	79f	1.5 ± 1.1	0.32 ± 0.06	10.9 ± 1.5	0.2	7.3
	79g	16 ± 4.9	0.11 ± 0.02	94 ± 18	0.07	5.9

==== Paroxetine homologues ====
See the N-methyl paroxetine homologues cf. di-aryl phenyltropanes for another SSRI approximated hybrid: the fluoxetine based homologue of the phenyltropane class.

2-(3,4-(Methylenedioxy)phenoxy)methyl-norphenyltropane binding potencies
Compound Structure	Short Name (S. Singh)	Stereochemistry	DAT [^{3}H]WIN 35428 IC_{50} (nM)	5-HTT [^{3}H]Paroxetine IC_{50} (nM)	NET [^{3}H]Nisoxetine IC_{50} (nM)	Selectivity 5-HTT/DAT	Selectivity NET/DAT
	Paroxetine	-	623 ± 25	0.28 ± 0.02	535 ± 15	0.0004	0.8
	R-81a	2β,3β	835 ± 90	480 ± 21	37400 ± 1400	0.6	44.8
	R-81b	2α,3β	142 ± 13	90 ± 3.4	2500 ± 250	0.6	17.6
	R-81c	2β,3α	3.86 ± 0.2	5.62 ± 0.2	14.4 ± 1.3	1.4	3.7
	S-81d	2β,3β	1210 ± 33	424 ± 15	17300 ± 1800	0.3	14.3
	S-81e	2α,3β	27.6 ± 2.4	55.8 ± 5.73	1690 ± 150	2.0	61.2
	S-81f	2β,3α	407 ± 33	19 ± 1.8	1990 ± 176	0.05	4.9

=== N-replaced (S,O,C) ===
R-97a (above) & S-97b (below), both examples of interim. synth. prod. in the R/S-90 & 91 series of phenyltropanes; showing the decay of the benzene structure during the synthetic process preceding the creation of like-series of PTs.

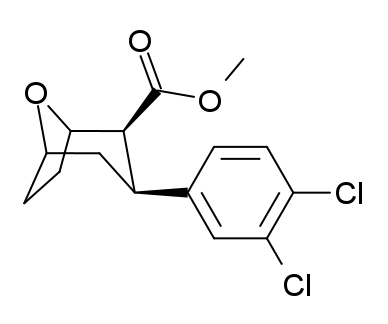
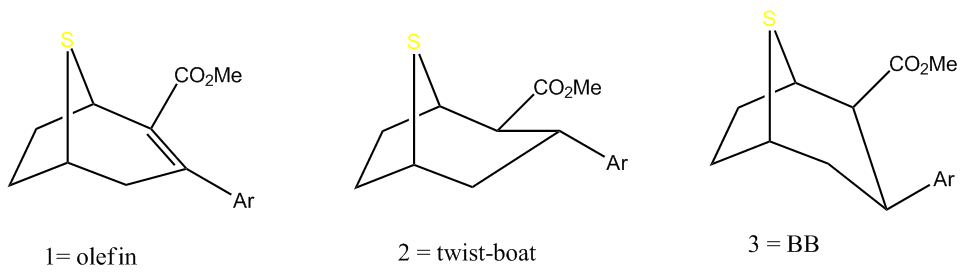

Mid-synth stage in similar compound preparation as like to above.

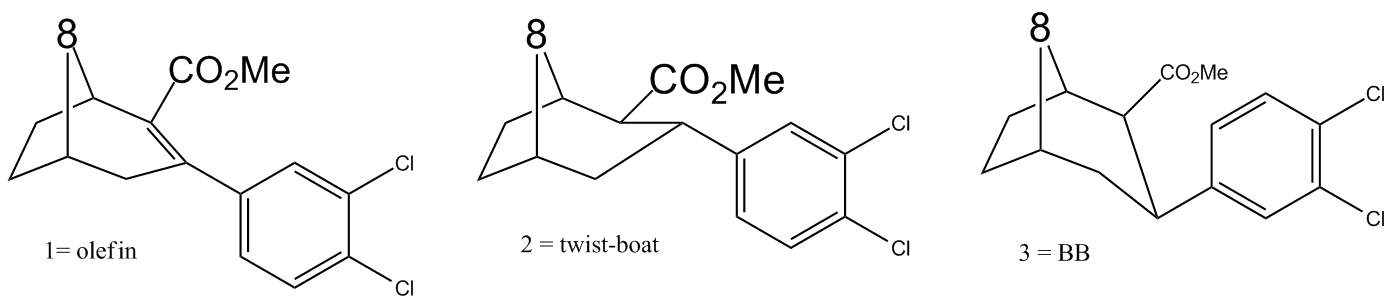

The eight position nitrogen has been found to not be an exclusively necessary functional anchor for binding at the MAT for phenyltropanes and related compounds. Sulfurs, oxygens, and even the removal of any heteroatom, leaving only the carbon skeleton of the structure at the bridged position, still show distinct affinity for the monoamine transporter cocaine-target site and continue to form an ionic bond with a measurable degree of reasonable efficacy.

Compound	X	2 Group	config	8	DA	5-HT	NE
Tropoxane	Cl,Cl	CO_{2}Me	(racemic) β,β	O	3.3	6.5	No data
O-4210	p-F	3-methyl-5-isoxazole	β,β	S	7.0	>1000	No data

==== 8-oxa bridgehead replacements ====
8-Oxanortropanes, binding inhibition using monkey caudate-putamen
Structure	Compound # (S. Singh)	Para- (meta-)	DAT (IC_{50} nM) displacement of [H^{3}]WIN 35428	5-HTT (IC_{50} nM) [H^{3}]Citalopram	Selectivity 5-HTT/DAT
	R/S-90a	H	>1000	>1000	-
	R/S-90b	F	546	2580	4.7
	R/S-90c	Cl	10	107	10.7
	R/S-90d	Br	22	30	1.4
	R/S-90e	I	7	12	1.7
	R/S-90f	3,4-Cl_{2}	3.35	6.52	1.9
	R-90g	3,4-Cl_{2}	3.27	4.67	1.4
	S-90h	3,4-Cl_{2}	47	58	1.2
	R/S-91a	H	1990	11440	5.7
	R/S-91b	F	>1000	>10000	-
	R/S-91c	Cl	28.5	816	28.6
	R/S-91d	Br	9	276	30.7
	R/S-91e	I	42	72	1.7
	R/S-91f	3,4-Cl_{2}	3.08	64.5	20.9
	R-91g	3,4-Cl_{2}	2.34	31	13.2
	S-91h	3,4-Cl_{2}	56	2860	51.1

==== 8-carba bridgehead replacements ====
8-carba 3-Aryl bicyclo[3.2.1]octanes
Structure	Compound # (S. Singh)	DAT (IC_{50} nM) displacement of [H^{3}]WIN 35428	5-HTT (IC_{50} nM) [H^{3}]Citalopram	Selectivity 5-HTT/DAT
	R/S-98a	7.1 ± 1.7	5160 ± 580	726
	R/S-98b	9.6 ± 1.8	33.4 ± 0.6	3.5
	R/S-98c	14.3 ± 1.1	180 ± 65	12.6

=== N-alkyl ===
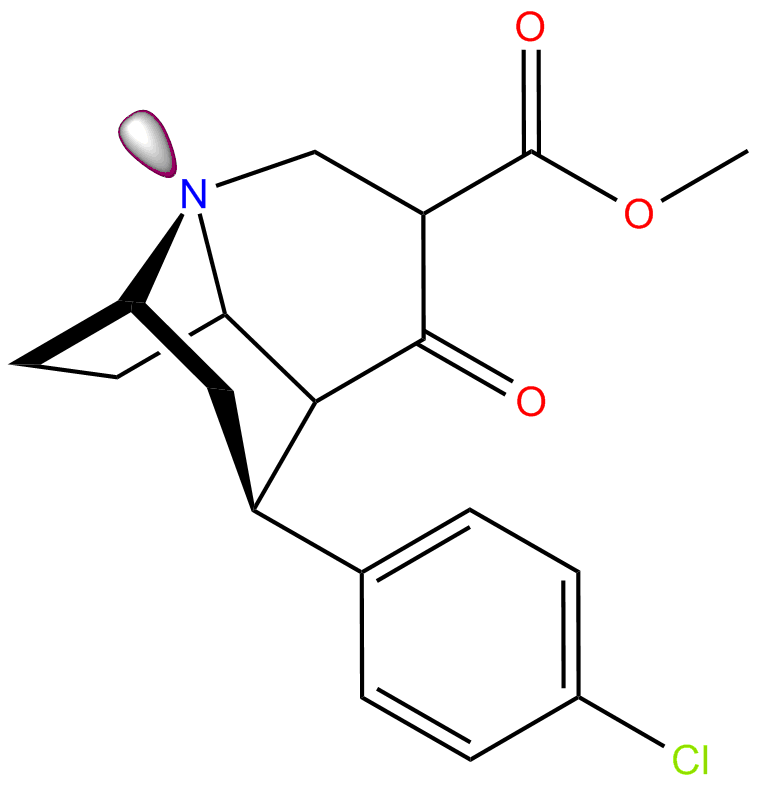

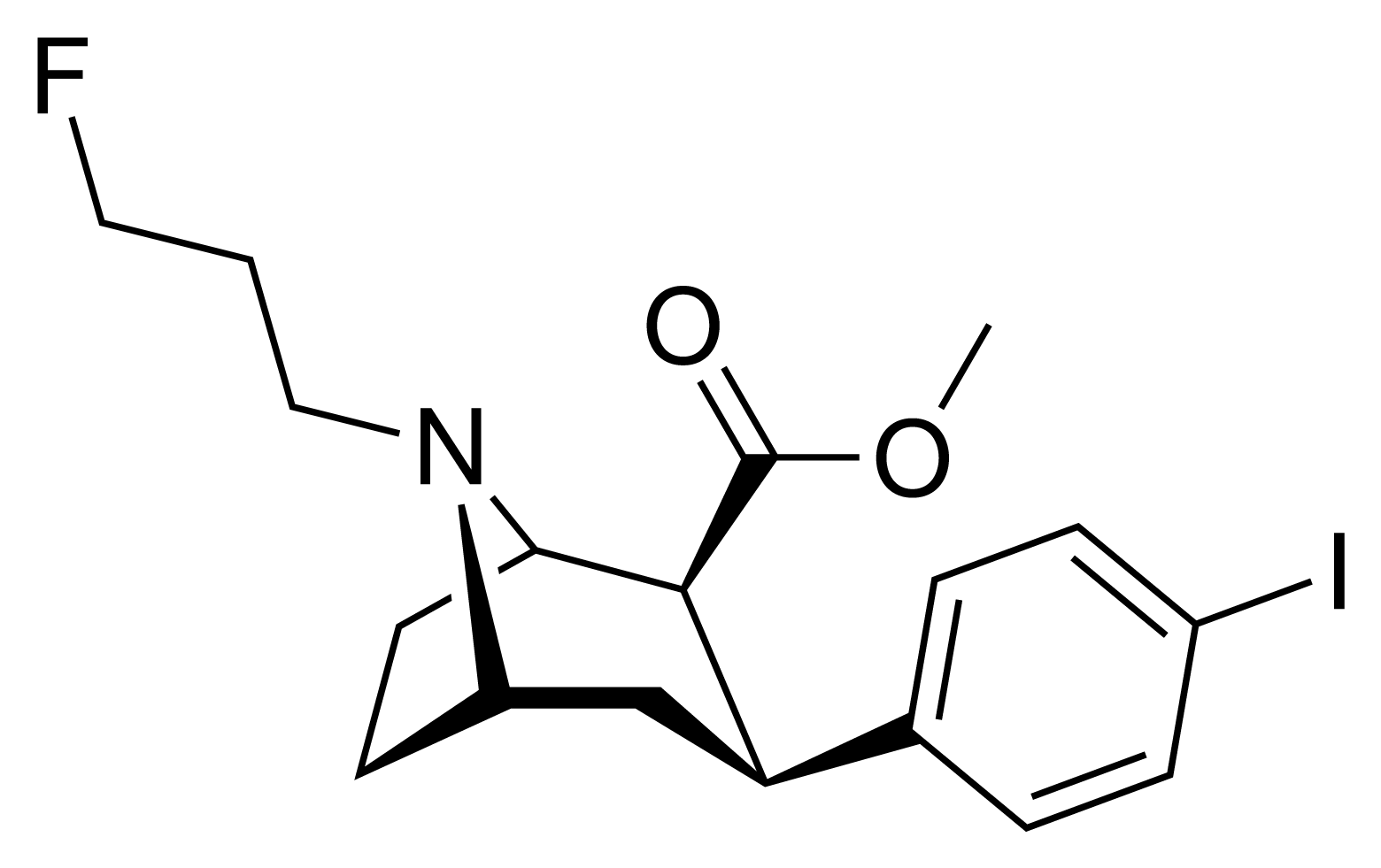

Compound	X	2 Group	config	8	DAT	SERT	NET
FP-β-CPPIT	Cl	3′-phenylisoxazol-5′-yl	β,β	NCH_{2}CH_{2}CH_{2}F	-	-	-
FE-β-CPPIT	Cl	(3′-phenylisoxazol-5′-yl)	β,β	NCH_{2}CH_{2}F	-	-	-
Altropane (IACFT)	F	CO_{2}Me	β,β	NCH_{2}CH=CHF	-	-	-
FECNT	I	CO_{2}Me	β,β	NCH_{2}CH_{2}F	-	-	-
RTI-310 U.S. patent 5,736,123	I	CO_{2}Me	β,β	N-Pr^{n}	1.17	-	-
RTI-311	I	CO_{2}Me	β,β	NCH_{2}CH=CH_{2}	1.79	-	-
RTI-312 U.S. patent 5,736,123	I	CO_{2}Me	β,β	NBu^{n}	0.76	-	-
RTI-313 U.S. patent 5,736,123	I	CO_{2}Me	β,β	NCH_{2}CH_{2}CH_{2}F	1.67	-	-
Ioflupane (FP-CIT)	^{123}I	CO_{2}Me	β,β	NCH_{2}CH_{2}CH_{2}F	-	-	-
PE2I	Me	CO_{2}Me	β,β	NCH_{2}CH=CHI	-	-	-
RTI-251	Cl	CO_{2}Me	β,β	NCH_{2}CO_{2}Et	1.93	10.1	114
RTI-252	Cl	CO_{2}Me	β,β	NCH_{2}CH_{2}CO_{2}Et	2.56	35.2	125
RTI-242	Cl	β,β (bridged) -C(O)CH(CO_{2}Me)CH_{2}N			7.67	227	510

Bi- and tri-cyclic aza compounds and their uses.

N-substituted 3β-phenylnortropanes (including N-phthalimidoalkyl analogues of β-CIT)
Structure	Short Name (S. Singh)	Nitrogen side-chain (N8)	DAT [^{3}H]GBR 12935 K_{i} (nM)	5-HTT [^{3}H]Paroxetine K_{i} (nM)	NET [^{3}H]Nisoxetine K_{i} (nM)	Selectivity 5-HTT/DAT	Selectivity NET/DAT
	Cocaine	H	350 ± 80	>10000	>30000	>28.6	-
	GBR 12909	-	0.06 ± 0.02	52.8 ± 4.4	>20000	880	-
	WIN 35428; 11b	H	14.7 ± 2.9	181 ± 21	635 ± 110	12.3	43.2
	RTI-55; 11e	H	1.40 ± 0.20	0.46 ± 0.06	2.80 ± 0.40	0.3	2
	82a	CH_{2}CH=CH_{2}	22.6 ± 2.9^{ɑ}	-	-	-	-
	82b	CH_{2}CH_{2}CH_{3}	43.0 ± 17.7^{ɑ}	-	-	-	-
	82c	CH_{2}C_{6}H_{5}	58.9 ± 1.65^{b}	1073^{c}	-	18.2	-
	82d	(CH_{2})_{3}C_{6}H_{5}	1.4 ± 0.2^{b}	133 ± 7^{c}	-	95.0	-
	82e	(CH_{2})_{5}C_{6}H_{5}	3.4 ± 0.83^{b}	49.9 ± 10.2^{c}	-	14.7	-
	83a	CH_{2}CH_{2}CH_{2}F	1.20 ± 0.29	48.7 ± 8.4	10000	40.6	8333
	83b	CH_{2}CH_{2}F	4.40 ± 0.35	21.7 ± 8.3	>10000	4.9	-
	84a	CH_{2}CH_{2}CH_{2}F	3.50 ± 0.39	0.110 ± 0.02	63.0 ± 4.0	0.03	18
	84b	CH_{2}CH_{2}F	4.00 ± 0.73	0.140 ± 0.02	93.0 ± 17.0	0.03	23.2
	84c	CH_{2}CHF_{2}	15.1 ± 3.7	9.6 ± 1.5	>5000	0.6	-
	84d	CH_{2}CH_{2}CH_{2}Cl	3.10 ± 0.57	0.32 ± 0.06	96.0 ± 29.0	0.1	31.0
	84e	CH_{2}CH_{2}CH_{2}Br	2.56 ± 0.57	0.35 ± 0.08	164 ± 47	0.1	64.1
	84f	CH_{2}CH_{2}CH_{2}I	38.9 ± 6.3	8.84 ± 0.53	5000	0.2	128
	84g	CH_{2}...methylcyclopropane	4.30 ± 0.87	1.30 ± 0.25	198 ± 9.6	0.3	46.0
	84h	CH_{2}CH_{2}CH_{2}OH	5.39 ± 0.21	2.50 ± 0.20	217 ± 19	0.5	40.2
	84i	CH_{2}CH_{2}(OCH_{3})_{2}	6.80 ± 1.10	1.69 ± 0.09	110 ± 7.7	0.2	16.2
	84j	CH_{2}CO_{2}CH_{3}	11.9 ± 1.4	0.81 ± 0.10	29.1 ± 1.0	0.07	2.4
	84k	CH_{2}CON(CH_{3})_{2}	12.2 ± 3.8	6.40 ± 1.70	522 ± 145	0.5	42.8
	84l	CH_{2}CH_{2}CH_{2}OMs	36.3 ± 2.1	17.3 ± 1.2	5000	0.5	138
	84m	COCH(CH_{3})_{2}	2100 ± 140	102 ± 23	>10000	0.05	-
	84n	(CH_{2})_{2}Pht	4.23 ± 0.48	0.84 ± 0.02	441 ± 66.0	0.2	104
	84o	(CH_{2})_{3}Pht	9.10 ± 1.10	0.59 ± 0.07	74.0 ± 11.6	0.06	8.1
	84p	(CH_{2})_{4}Pht	2.38 ± 0.22	0.21 ± 0.02	190 ± 18.0	0.09	79.8
	84q	(CH_{2})_{5}Pht	2.40 ± 0.17	0.34 ± 0.03	60.0 ± 3.10	0.1	25.0
	84r	(CH_{2})_{8}Pht	2.98 ± 0.30	0.20 ± 0.02	75.0 ± 3.6	0.07	25.2
	84s^{d}	CH_{2}CH=CH-CH_{3}	15 ± 1	75 ± 5	400 ± 80	5.0	26.7
	84t^{d}	CH_{2}C(Br)=CH_{2}	30 ± 5	200 ± 40	>1000	6.7	-
	84u^{d}	CH_{2}CH=CH_{2}I(E)	30 ± 5	960 ± 60	295 ± 33	32.0	9.8
	84v^{d}	CH_{2}C≡CH	14 ± 1	100 ± 30	>1000	7.1	-
	84w^{d}	CH_{2}C_{6}H_{5}	42 ± 12	100 ± 17	600 ± 100	2.4	14.3
	84x^{d}	CH_{2}C_{6}H_{4}-2-CH_{3}	93 ± 19	225 ± 40	>1000	2.4	-
	85a^{d}	para-H	113 ± 41	100 ± 20	>1000	0.9	-
	85b^{d}	para-Cl, meta-Cl	29 ± 4	50 ± 6	500 ± 120	1.7	17.2
	85c^{d}	para-Me	17 ± 7	500 ± 30	>1000	29.4	-
	85d^{d}	para-CH(CH_{3})_{2}	500 ± 120	450 ± 80	>1000	0.9	-
	85e^{d}	para-n-C_{3}H_{7}	500 ± 100	300 ± 12	750 ± 160	0.6	1.5

- ^{ɑ}IC_{50} for displacement of [^{3}H]cocaine. IC_{50} for cocaine = 67.8 ± 8.7 (nM)
- ^{b}IC_{50} values for displacement of [^{3}H]WIN 35428
- ^{c}IC_{50} values for displacement of [^{3}H]citalopram
- ^{d}The standard K_{i} value for the displacement of [^{3}H]GBR 12935, [^{3}H]paroxetine, and [^{3}H]nisoxetine were 27 ± 2, 3 ± 0.2, and 80 ± 28 nM, respectively, for these experiments

3β-(4-alkylthiophenyl)nortropanes
Structure	Compound	R_{1}	R_{2}	Inhibition of [^{3}H]WIN 35,428 @ DAT IC_{50} (nM)	Inhibition of [^{3}H]Paroxetine @ 5-HTT K_{i} (nM)	Inhibition of [^{3}H]Nisoxetine @ NET K_{i} (nM)	NET/DAT (uptake ratio)	NET/5-HTT (uptake ratio)
See 7a—7h table
See 7a—7h table	7a	CH_{3}	CH_{3}	9 ± 3	0.7 ± 0.2	220 ± 10	24	314
See 7a—7h table	7b	C_{2}H_{5}	CH_{3}	232 ± 34	4.5 ± 0.5	1170 ± 300	5	260
	8a	CH_{3}	H	28 ± 6	0.19 ± 0.01	21 ± 6	0.8	110
	8b	C_{2}H_{5}	H	177 ± 62	1.26 ± 0.05	118 ± 13	0.7	94
	9a	CH_{3}	FCH_{2}CH_{2}CH_{2}	112 ± 2	3 ± 1	960 ± 100	9	320
	9b	C_{2}H_{5}	FCH_{2}CH_{2}CH_{2}	1,200 ± 200	27 ± 2	>2,000	2	74
	10a	CH_{3}	CH_{2}=CH_{2}CH_{2}	71 ± 25	5.5 ± 0.8	2,000 ± 500	28	364
	10b	C_{2}H_{5}	CH_{2}=CH_{2}CH_{2}	1,100 ± 100	47 ± 3	>2,000	2	43
	11a	CH_{3}	CH_{3}CH_{2}CH_{2}	74 ± 20	5.7 ± 0.6	1,200 ± 140	16	211
	11b	C_{2}H_{5}	CH_{3}CH_{2}CH_{2}	900 ± 300	49 ± 6	>2,000	2	41

=== Bridged N-constrained phenyltropanes (fused/tethered) ===
See: Bridged cocaine derivatives & N8 Tricyclic (2β—crossed-over) N8—to—3β replaced aryl linked (expansive front-bridged) cocaine analogues

==== p-methyl aryl front & back N-bridged phenyltropanes ====
U.S. patent 6,150,376

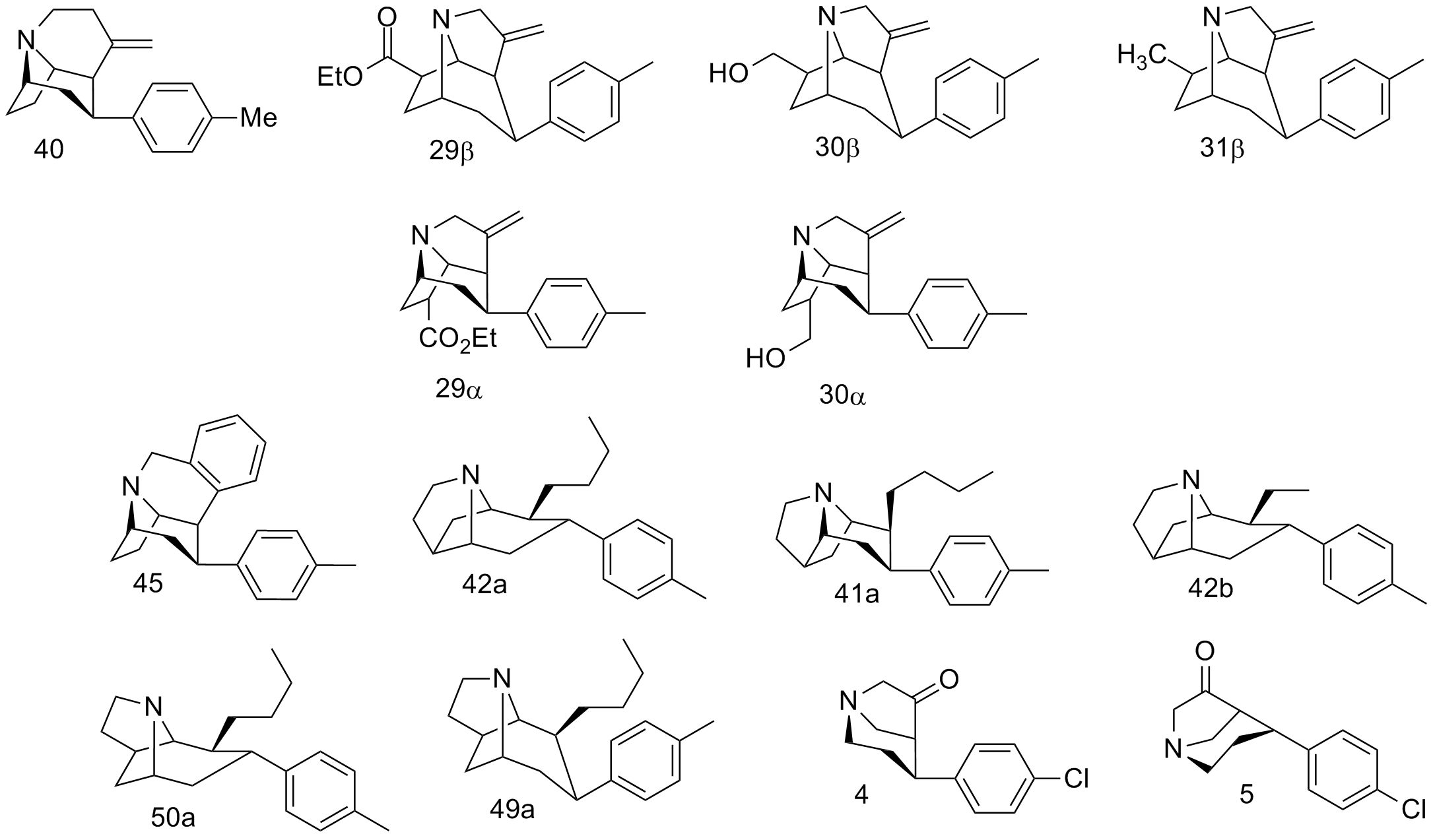
Structures mentioned in US6150376 table of K_{i} data.

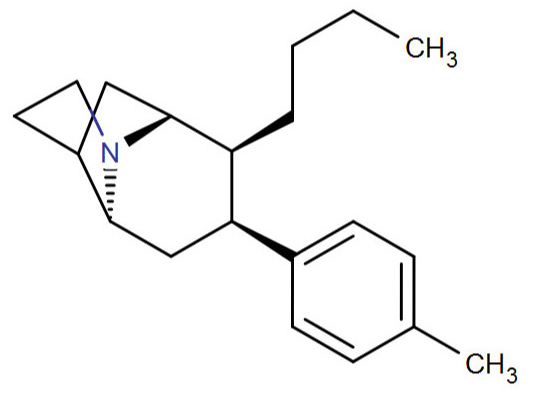
Alternate 2D rendering of compound "42a" (from among the above 'bridged' phenyltropanes) to elucidate the potential overlaying structure of the place inhabited by the constrained nitrogen. Compare JNJ-7925476, tametraline and similar compounds.

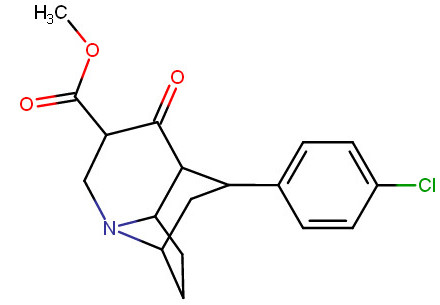
RTI-242

Activity at monoamine transporters: Binding Affinities & MAT Inhibition of Bridged Phenyltropanes K_{i} (nM)
Compound # (S. Singh's #)	2β=R	[^{3}H]Mazindol binding	[^{3}H]DA uptake	[^{3}H]5-HT uptake	[^{3}H]NE uptake	selectivity [^{3}H]5-HT/[^{3}H]DA
cocaine	CO_{2}CH_{3}	375 ± 68	423 ± 147	155 ± 40	83.3 ± 1.5	0.4
(–)-40 (–)-128		54.3 ± 10.2	60.3 ± 0.4	1.76 ± 0.23	5.24 ± 0.07	0.03
(+)-40 (+)-128		79 ± 19	114 ± 28	1.48 ± 0.07	4.62 ± 0.31	0.01
(±)-40 (±)-128		61.7 ± 8.5	60.3 ± 0.4	2.32 ± 0.23	2.69 ± 0.12	0.04
29β		620	1420	8030	—	—
30β		186	492	97.7	—	—
31β		47.0	211	28.5	—	—
29α		4140	20100	3920	—	—
30α		3960	8850	696	1150	—
45; 129		6.86 ± 0.43	24.0 ± 1.3	1.77 ± 0.04	1.06 ± 0.03	0.07
42a 131a	n-Bu	4.00 ± 0.07	2.23 ± 0.12	14.0 ± 0.6	2.99 ± 0.17	6.3
41a 130a	n-Bu	17.2 ± 1.13	10.2 ± 1.4	78.9 ± 0.9	15.0 ± 0.4	7.8
42b 131b	Et	3.61 ± 0.43	11.3 ± 1.1	25.7 ± 4.3	4.43 ± 0.01	2.3
50a 133a	n-Bu	149 ± 6	149 ± 2	810 ± 80	51.7 ± 12	5.4
49a 132a	n-Bu	13.7 ± 0.8	14.2 ± 0.1	618 ± 87	3.84 ± 0.35	43.5
(–)-4		10500	16500	1890	70900	—
(+)-4		18500	27600	4630	38300	—
(–)-5		9740	9050	11900	4650	—
(+)-5		6770	10500	25100	4530	—
RTI-4229/Coc-242	N8/2β-C(O)CH(CO2Me)CH2N para-chloro	—	7.67 ± 0.31^{ɑ}	226.54 ± 27.37^{b}	510.1 ± 51.4^{c}	—

- ^{ɑ}Value for displacement of [^{3}H]WIN 35,428 binding @ DAT
- ^{b}Value for displacement of [^{3}H]paroxetine binding to SERT
- ^{c}Value for displacement of [^{3}H]nisoxetine from NET

Fused tropane-derivatives as neurotransmitter reuptake inhibitors. Singh notes that all bridged derivatives tested displayed 2.5—104 fold higher DAT affinity than cocaine. The ones 2.8—190 fold more potent at DAT also had increased potency at the other two MAT sites (NET & SERT); NET having 1.6—78× increased activity. (+)-128 additionally exhibited 100× greater potency @ SERT, whereas 132a & 133a had 4–5.2× weaker 5-HTT (i.e. SERT) activity. Front-bridged (e.g. 128 & 129) had a better 5-HT/DA reuptake ratio in favor of SERT, while the back-bridged (e.g. 130–133) preferred placement with DAT interaction. U.S. patent 5,998,405

==== 3,4-Cl_{2} aryl front-bridged phenyltropanes ====
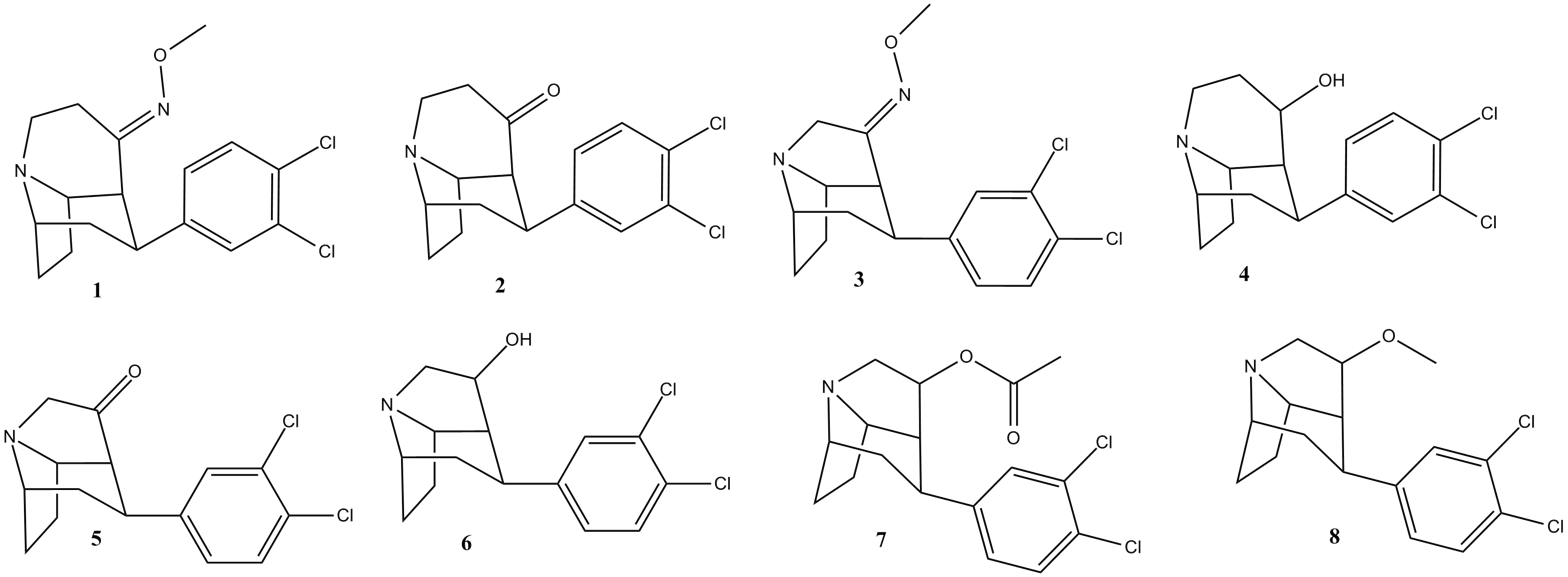
Fused Tropane: NeuroSearch A/S, Scheel-Krüger et al. U.S. patent 5,998,405

Frontbridged phenyltropane synthesis intermediate product compound #140

Code	Compound	DA (μM)	NE (μM)	5-HT (μM)
1	(1 S,2S,4S,7R)-2-(3,4-Dichloro- phenyl)-8-azatricyclo[5.4.0.0^{4,8}]- undecan-11 -one O-methyl-oxime	0.012	0.0020	0.0033
2	(1 S,2S,4S,7R)-2-(3,4-Dichloro- phenyl)-8-azatricyclo[5.4.0.0^{4,8}]- undecan-11-one	0.18	0.035	0.0075
3	(1 S,3S,4S,8R)-3-(3,4-Dichloro-phenyl)-7-azatricyclo[5.3.0.04,8]- decan-5-one O-methyl-oxime	0.0160	0.0009	0.0032
4	(1 S,2S,4S,7R)-2-(3,4-Dichloro-phenyl)-8-azatricyclo[5.4.0.04,8]- undecan-11-ol	0.0750	0.0041	0.0028
5	(1 S,3S,4S,8R)-3-(3,4-Dichloro-phenyl)-7-azatricyclo[5.3.0.04,8]- decan-5-one	0.12	0.0052	0.0026
6	(1 S,3S,4S,8R)-3-(3,4-Dichloro- phenyl)-7-azatricyclo[5.3.0.04,8]-decan-5-ol	0.25	0.0074	0.0018
7	(1S,3S,4S,8R)-3- (3,4-Dichloro- phenyl)-7-azatricyclo[5.3.0.04,8]dec- 5-yl acetate	0.21	0.0061	0.0075
8	(1S,3S,4S,8R)-3-(3,4-Dichlorophenyl)-5-methoxy-7- azatricyclo[5.3.0.04,8]decane	0.022	0.0014	0.0001

1. 1-Chloroethyl chloroformate is used to remove N-methyl of trans-aryltropanes.
2. 2° amine is reacted with Br(CH_{2})nCO_{2}Et.
3. Base used to abstract proton α- to CO_{2}Et group and complete the tricyclic ring closure step (Dieckmann cyclization).

To make a different type of analog (see Kozikowski patent above)

1. Remove N-Me
2. Add ɣ-bromo-chloropropane
3. Allow for cyclization with K_{2}CO_{3} base and KI cat.

==== C2 + C3 (side-chain) fused (carboxylate & benzene conjoined) ====
Nitrogen-front-bridged indole phenyltropane.

(1R,2S,10R,12S)-15-methyl-15-azatetracyclo(10.2.1.0^{2},^{10}.0^{4},^{9})pentadeca-4(9),5,7-trien-3-one

==== C3 to 1′ + 2′ (ortho) tropane locant dual arene bridged ====

Parent compound of a series of spirocyclic cocaine benzoyl linkage modification analogs created by Suzuki coupling method of ortho-substituted arylboronic acids and an enol-triflate derived from cocaine; which technically has the three methylene length of cocaine analogues as well as the single length which defines the phenyltropane series. Note that the carbomethoxyl group is (due to constraints in synthetic processes used in the creation of this compound) alpha configured; which is not the usual, most prevalent, conformation favored for the PT cocaine-receptor binding pocket of most such sub-type of chemicals. The above and below depictions show attested compounds synthesized, additionally with variations upon the Endo–exo isomerism of their structures.

== Cycloalkane-ring alterations of the tropane ring system ==
=== Azanonane (outer ring extended) ===
3-Phenyl-9-azabicyclo[3.3.1]nonane derivatives

To better elucidate the binding requirements at MAT, the methylene unit on the tropane was extended by one to create the azanonane analogs. (Note: ←Page #967 (43rd page of article) 2nd column) Which are the beginning of classes of modifications that start to become effected by the concerns & influences of macrocyclic stereocontrol.

Despite the loosened flexibility of the ring system, nitrogen constrained variants (such as were created to make the bridged class of phenyltropanes) which might better fit the rigid placement necessary to suit the spatial requirements needed in the binding pocket were not synthesized. Though front-bridged types were synthesized for the piperidine homologues: the trend of equal values for either isomers of that type followed the opposing trend of a smaller and lessened plasticity of the molecule to contend with a rationale for further constraining the pharmacophore within that scope. Instead such findings lend credence to the potential for the efficacy of fusing the nitrogen on an enlarged tropane, as like upon the compounds given below.

[3.3.1]azanonane analogues displacement of bound [^{3}H]WIN 35428
Structure	Compound # (S. Singh)	K_{i} (nM)
	Cocaine	32 ± 5; 390 ± 220
	WIN 35065-2	33 ± 17; 310 ± 220
	146a	4600 ± 510
	146b	5730 ± 570
	146c	3450 ± 310
	146d	3470 ± 350
	147	13900 ± 2010

=== Azabornane (outer ring contracted) ===
3-Phenyl-7-azabicyclo[2.2.1]heptane derivatives

Ring-contracted analogs of phenyltropanes did not permit sufficient penetration of the phenyl into the target binding site on MAT for an affinity in the efficacious range. The distance from the nitrogen to the phenyl centroid for 155a was 4.2 and 155c was 5.0 Å, respectively. (Whereas troparil was 5.6 & compound 20a 5.5 angstroms). However piperidine homologues (discussed below) had comparable potencies. (Note: ←Page #967 (43rd page of article) 2nd column)

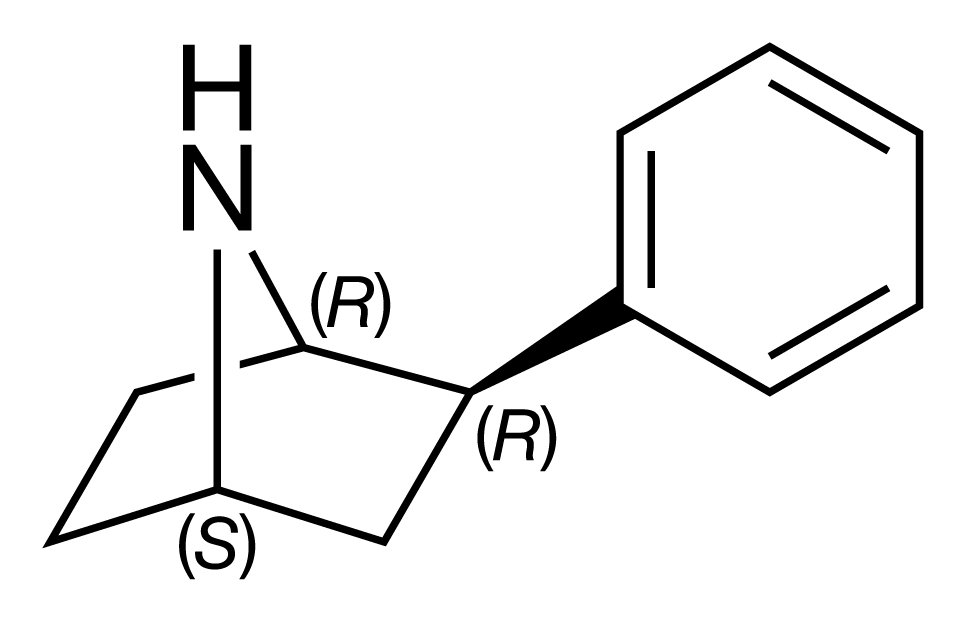
2-exo-phenyl-7-azabicyclo[2.2.1]heptane: The non-carboxylic (and DAT substrate, releasing agent) variant of exo-2-phenyl-7-azabicyclo(2.2.1)heptane-1-carboxylic acid (N.B. the carboxy in the latter shares the C1 tropane position with the two carbon nitrogen containing bridge; sharing in the leftmost (R) substitution of the above depiction & unlike the placement on the tropane for either the carbmethoxy or phenyl ring of the azabornane analogues given in this section) With the carboxy ester function removed the resultant derived compound acts as a DAT substrate drug, thus an amphetaminergic releaser of MAT & VMAT, yet similar to phenyltropanes (that usually are only re-uptake ligands) cf. EXP-561 & BTQ.

Azabornanes with longer substitutions at the 3β-position (benzoyloxys alkylphenyls, carbamoyls etc.) or with the nitrogen in the position it would be on the piperidine homologues (i.e. arrangements of differing locations for the nitrogens being either distal or proximal within the terms required to facilitate the framework of the compound to a correlative proportion, functional for the given moiety), were not synthesized, despite conclusions that the nitrogen to phenyl length was the issue at variance enough to be the interfering factor for the proper binding of the compressed topology of the azabornane. Carroll, however, has listed benzoyloxy azabornanes in patents.

[2.2.1]azabornane analogues displacement of bound [^{3}H]WIN 35428
Structure	Compound # (S. Singh)	K_{i} (nM)
	Cocaine	32 ± 5; 390 ± 220
	WIN 35065-2	33 ± 17; 310 ± 220
	155a	60,400 ± 4,800
	155b	96,500 ± 42
	155c	5,620 ± 390
	155d	18,900 ± 1,700

=== Piperidine homologues (inner two-carbon bridge excised) ===
Piperidine homologues had comparable affinity & potency spreads to their respective phenyltropane analogues. Without as much of a discrepancy between the differing isomers of the piperidine class with respect to affinity and binding values as had in the phenyltropanes.

==== p-chloro & related (piperidine homologues of phenyltropanes) ====
Phenyltropane 4-aryl-3-carboalkoxy-piperidine analogues
Structure	Compound # (S. Singh)	X = para- / 4′- Substitution	R = 2-tropane position	DAT (IC_{50} nM) [H^{3}]WIN 35428 binding displacement	DA (IC_{50} nM) [H^{3}]DA uptake	Selectivity Uptake/Binding
	Cocaine	H	CO_{2}Me	102 ± 9	239 ± 1	2.3
	(±)-166a	Cl	β-CO_{2}CH_{3}	53.7 ± 1.9	37.8 ± 7.9	0.7
	(-)-166a	Cl	β-CO_{2}CH_{3}	24.8 ± 1.6	85.2 ± 2.6	3.4
	(+)-166a	Cl	β-CO_{2}CH_{3}	1360 ± 125	5090 ± 172	3.7
	(-)-167a	Cl	β-CO_{2}OH	75.3 ± 6.2	49.0 ± 3.0	0.6
	(+)-167a	Cl	β-CO_{2}OH	442 ± 32	—	—
	(-)-168a	Cl	β-CO_{2}OAc	44.7 ± 10.5	62.9 ± 2.7	1.4
	(+)-168a	Cl	β-CO_{2}OAc	928 ± 43	2023 ± 82	2.2
	(-)-169a	Cl	β-n-Pr	3.0 ± 0.5	8.3 ± 0.6	2.8
	(-)-170a	H	β-CO_{2}CH_{3}	769 ± 19	—	—
	(±)-166b	Cl	α-CO_{2}CH_{3}	197 ± 8	—	—
	(+)-166b	Cl	α-CO_{2}CH_{3}	57.3 ± 8.1	34.6 ± 3.2	0.6
	(-)-166b	Cl	α-CO_{2}CH_{3}	653 ± 38	195 ± 8	0.3
	(+)-167b	Cl	α-CO_{2}OH	240 ± 18	683 ± 47	2.8
	(+)-168b	Cl	α-CO_{2}OAc	461 ± 11	—	—
	(+)-169b	Cl	α-n-Pr	17.2 ± 0.5	23.2 ± 2.2	1.3

Heterocyclic N-Desmethyl
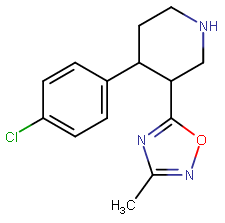

==== Naphthyl & related (piperidine homologues of phenyltropanes) ====
Activity @ MAT for piperidine homologues of phenyltropanes, including naphthyl derivatives
Structure	Compound #	[^{3}H]DA uptake (nM) IC_{50}	[^{3}H]DA uptake (nM) Ki	[^{3}H]NE uptake (nM) IC_{50}	[^{3}H]NE uptake (nM) Ki	[^{3}H]5-HTT uptake (nM) IC_{50}	[^{3}H]5-HTT uptake (nM) Ki	Uptake Ratio DA/5-HT (Ki)	Uptake Ratio NE/5-HT (Ki)
	Cocaine	459 ± 159	423 ± 147	127 ± 4.1	108 ± 3.5	168 ± 0.4	155 ± 0.4	2.7	0.69
	Fluoxetine	>4500	>2500	193 ± 4.1	176 ± 3.5	8.1 ± 0.7	7.3 ± 0.7	624	24
	20	75 ± 9.1	69 ± 8.1	101 ± 3.3	88 ± 2.9	440 ± 30	391 ± 27	0.18	0.23
	6	23 ± 1.0	21 ± 0.9	-	34 ± 0.8	8.2 ± 0.3	7.6 ± 0.2	2.8	4.5
	7	>1000	947 ± 135	-	241 ± 1.7	8.2 ± 0.3	7.6 ± 0.2	22.6	5.7
	8	94 ± 9.6	87 ± 8.9	-	27 ± 1.6	209 ± 17	192 ± 16	0.45	0.14
	9	293 ± 6.4	271 ± 5.9	-	38 ± 4.0	13 ± 0.7	12 ± 0.7	23	3.2
	19	97 ± 8.6	90 ± 8.0	34 ± 2.5	30 ± 2.3	3.9 ± 0.5	3.5 ± 0.5	26	8.6
	10	326 ± 1.2	304 ± 1.1	337 ± 37	281 ± 30	113 ± 4.3	101 ± 3.8	3.0	2.8
	14	144 ± 20	131 ± 18	204 ± 5.6	175 ± 4.8	155 ± 3.9	138 ± 3.5	0.95	1.3
	15	>1800	>1700	>1300	>1100	275 ± 39	255 ± 37	>6	>4
	16	>1000	964 ± 100	>1200	>1000	334 ± 48	309 ± 44	3.1	3.5
	17	213 ± 30	187 ± 26	399 ± 12	364 ± 9.2	189 ± 37	175 ± 34	1.1	2.1
	18	184 ± 30	173 ± 26	239 ± 42	203 ± 36	67 ± 4.5	62 ± 4.1	2.8	3.3

==== distal-nitrogen 'dimethylamine' (piperidine-like cyclohexyl homologues of phenyltropanes) ====
cf. Fencamfamine

== Radiolabeled ==
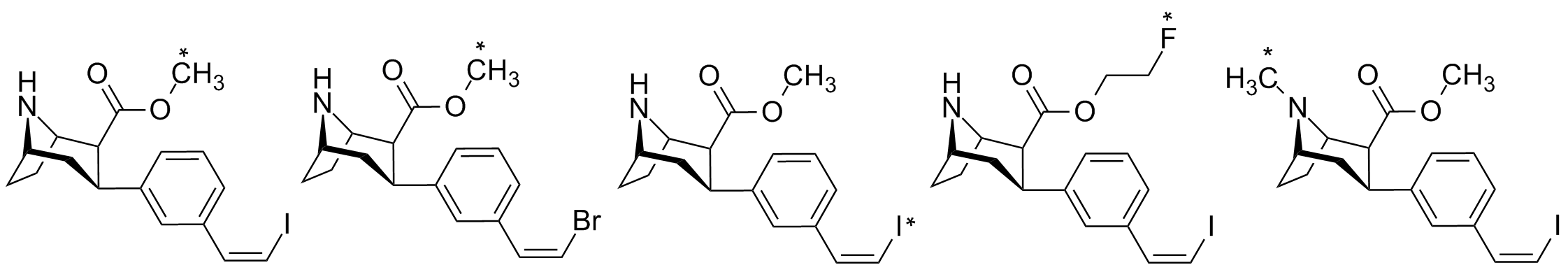
Radiolabel Tropane: Page 64. G.A. Whitlock et al. Table 1 Potential SRI PET and SPECT ligands.

LBT-999, a radio-ligand.

Code	SERT K_{i} (nM)	NET K_{i} (nM)	DAT K_{i} (nM)	Radiolabel	In vivo study	Refs.
1	0.2	102.2	29.9	^{11}C	Non-human primate	
2	0.2	31.7	32.6	^{11}C	Non-human primate	
3	0.05	24	3.47	^{123}I	Rat	
4	0.08	28	13	^{18}F	Non-human primate	
5	0.11	450	22	^{11}C	Rat, monkey	

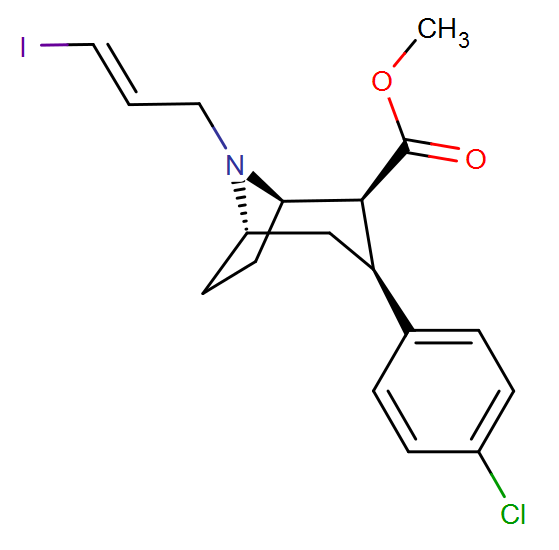
IPT (N-3-iodoprop-(2E)-ene-2β-carbomethoxy-3β-(4′-chlorophenyl)tropane), can be radiolabeled with ^{123}I or ^{125}I and used as a ligand to map several MATs

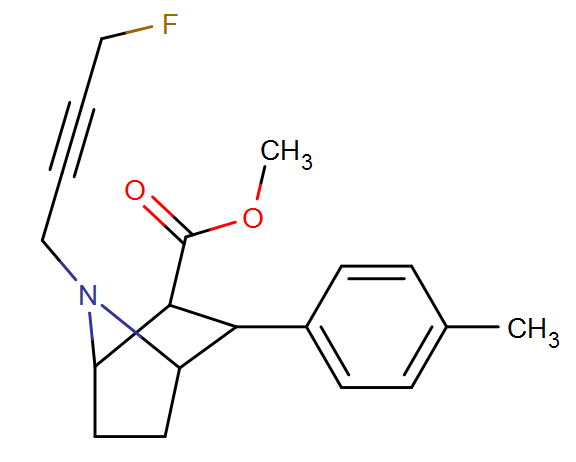
N-4-Fluorobut-2-yn-1-yl-2β-carbomethoxy-3β-phenyltropane (PR04.MZ) often radiolabeled.

JHC1-64. A fluorescent analog, similar in its long chain off of the nitrogen bridge similar to the transition metal phenyltropane types.

=== Transition metal complexes ===
These compounds include transition metals in their heteroatomic conformation, unlike non-radiolabel intended chelates where their element is chosen for intrinsic affectation to binding and function, these are tagged on by a "tail" (or similar) with a sufficient spacer to remain separated from known binding properties and instead are meant to add radioactivity enough to be easily tracked via observation methods that utilize radioactivity. As for anomalies of binding within the spectrum of the under-written kinds just mentioned: other factors not otherwise considered to account for its relatively lower potency, "compound 89c" is posited to protrude forward at the aryl place on its moiety toward the MAT ligand acceptor site in a manner detrimental to its efficacy. That is considered due to the steric bulk of the eight-position "tail" chelate substituted constituent, overreaching the means by which it was intended to be isolated from binding factors upon a tail, and ultimately nonetheless, interfering with its ability to bind. However, to broach this discrepancy, decreasing of the nitrogen tether at the eight position by a single methylene unit (89d) was shown to bring the potency of the analogous compound to the expected, substantially higher, potency: The N-methyl analog of 89c having an IC_{50} of 1.09 ± 0.02 @ DAT & 2.47 ± 0.14 nM @ SERT; making 89c upwards of thirty-three times weaker at those MAT uptake sites. (Note: ←Page #955 (31st page of article) 1st (left) column, 2nd ¶)

"Transition metal" chelated phenyltropanes
Structure	Compound # (S. Singh)	X = para- / 4′- Substitution	Configuration	DAT (IC_{50} nM) displacement of [H^{3}]WIN 35428	5-HTT (IC_{50} nM) [H^{3}]Citalopram	Selectivity 5-HTT/DAT
	WIN 35428	F	-	11.0 ± 1.0	160 ± 20	14.5
+2β-chelated phenyltropanes
	73; TRODAT-1^{ɑ}	Cl	-	R=13.9, S=8.42^{b}	-	-
	74; TROTEC-1	F	-	high affinity site = 0.15 ± 0.04^{c} low affinity site = 20.3 ± 16.1^{c}	-	-
N-chelated phenyltropanes
	89a	F	2β	5.99 ± 0.81	124 ± 17	20.7
	89b	F	2α	2960 ± 157	5020 ± 1880	1.7
	89c	3,4-Cl_{2}	2β	37.2 ± 3.4	264 ± 16	7.1
	89d	Cl	-	0.31 ± 0.03^{d}	-	-

- ^{ɑ}IUPAC: [2-[[2-[[[3-(4-chlorophenyl)-7-methyl-8-azabicyclo[3,2,1]oct-2-yl]methyl]-(2-mercaptoethyl)amino]ethyl]amino]ethanethiolato-(3—)-N2, N2′, S2, S2′]oxo-[1''R''-(''exo'', ''exo'')]-[99mTc]technetium
- ^{b}R- & S- isomer values are K_{i} (nM) for displacement of [^{125}I]IPT with technetium-99m replaced by rhenium
- ^{c}IC_{50} (nM) values for displacement of [^{3}H]WIN 35428 with ligand tricarbonyltechnetium replaced with rhenium. (IC_{50} for WIN 35428 were 2.62 ± 1.06 @ high affinity binding & 139 ± 72 @ low affinity binding sites)
- ^{d}K_{i} value for displacement of [^{125}I]IPT radioligand.

== Select annotations of above ==
Phenyltropanes can be grouped by "N substitution" "Stereochemistry" "2-substitution" & by the nature of the 3-phenyl group substituent X.
Often this has dramatic effects on selectivity, potency, and duration, also toxicity, since phenyltropanes are highly versatile. For more examples of interesting phenyltropanes, see some of the more recent patents, e.g. U.S. patent 6,329,520, U.S. patent 7,011,813, U.S. patent 6,531,483, and U.S. patent 7,291,737.

Potency in vitro should not be confused with the actual dosage, as pharmacokinetic factors can have a dramatic influence on what proportion of an administered dose actually gets to the target binding sites in the brain, and so a drug that is very potent at binding to the target may nevertheless have only moderate potency in vivo. For example, RTI-336 requires a higher dosage than cocaine. Accordingly, the active dosage of RTI-386 is exceedingly poor despite the relatively high ex vivo DAT binding affinity.

== Sister substances ==
Many molecular drug structures have exceedingly similar pharmarcology to phenyltropanes, yet by certain technicalities do not fit the phenyltropane moniker. These are namely classes of dopaminergic cocaine analogues that are in the piperidine class (a category that includes methylphenidate) or benztropine class (such as Difluoropine: which is extremely close to fitting the criteria of being a phenyltropane.) Whereas other potent DRIs are far removed from being in the phenyltropane structural family, such as Benocyclidine or Vanoxerine.

Most any variant with a tropane locant—3-β (or α) connecting linkage differing from, e.g. longer than, a single methylene unit (i.e. "phenyl"), including alkylphenyls (see the styrene analog, first image given in example below) is more correctly a "cocaine analogue" proper, and not a phenyltropane. Especially if this linkage imparts a sodium channel blocker functionality to the molecule.

== See also ==
- List of cocaine analogues
  - List of local anesthetics
- List of methylphenidate analogues
