= RTI-51 =

Chemical compound

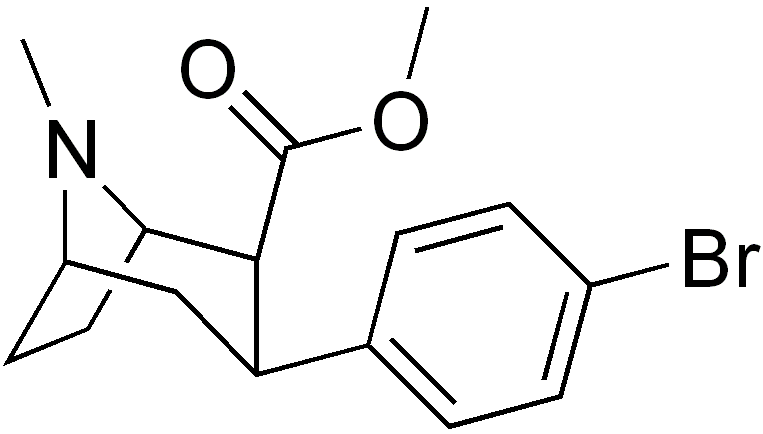

Identifiers
- IUPAC name: methyl (1R,2S,3S,5S)-3-(4-bromophenyl)-8-methyl-8-azabicyclo[3.2.1]octane-2-carboxylate
- CAS Number: 135367-08-7
- PubChem CID: 22595194
- UNII: C3MV2GV7R7
- CompTox Dashboard (EPA): DTXSID40720932

Chemical and physical data
- Formula: C_{16}H_{20}BrNO_{2}
- Molar mass: 338.245 g·mol^{−1}
- 3D model (JSmol): Interactive image
- SMILES: Brc1ccc(cc1)[C@H]2C[C@@H]3N(C)[C@H]([C@H]2C(=O)OC)CC3
- InChI: InChI=1S/C16H20BrNO2/c1-18-12-7-8-14(18)15(16(19)20-2)13(9-12)10-3-5-11(17)6-4-10/h3-6,12-15H,7-9H2,1-2H3/t12-,13-,14+,15+/m1/s1; Key:HNVGNUVAMRLMSG-KBXIAJHMSA-N

(–)-2β-Carbomethoxy-3β-(4-bromophenyl)tropane (RTI-4229-51, bromopane) is a semi-synthetic alkaloid in the phenyltropane group of psychostimulant compounds. First publicized in the 1990s, it has not been used enough to have gained a fully established profile. RTI-51 can be expected to have properties lying somewhere in between RTI-31 and RTI-55. It has a ratio of monoamine reuptake inhibition of dopamine > serotonin > norepinephrine (1.8:10.6:37.4 nM respectively) which is an unusual balance of effects not produced by other commonly used compounds (although RTI-121 is similar, but more DAT selective). It has been used in its ^{76}Br radiolabelled form to map the distribution of dopamine transporters in the brain.

Modern research seems to confirm the above hypothesis. However, earlier work produced more scattered results. Based upon what is obvious from the table, RTI-31, RTI-51, and RTI-55 are all similarly potent TRIs.

MAT IC_{50} (and K_{i}) for simple phenyltropanes with 1R,2S,3S stereochemistry.
Compound	[^{3}H]CFT	[^{3}H]DA	[^{3}H]Nisoxetine	[^{3}H]NE	[^{3}H]Paroxetine	[^{3}H]5-HT
Cocaine	89.1	275 cf. 241	3300 (1990)	119 cf. 161	1050 (45)	177 cf. 112
WIN 35,065-2	23	49.8	920 (550)	37.2	1960 (178)	173
WIN 35,428	13.9	23.0	835 (503)	38.6	692 (63)	101
RTI-31	1.1	3.68	37 (22)	5.86	44.5 (4.0)	5.00
RTI-113	1.98	5.25	2,926	242	2,340	391
RTI-51	1.7	?	37.4 (23)	?	10.6 (0.96)	?
RTI-55	1.3	1.96	36 (22)	7.51	4.21 (0.38)	1.74
RTI-32	1.7	7.02	60 (36)	8.42	240 (23)	19.4

Data in above table is from rats brains (1995). More recent work has advocated using cloned human transporters.

== See also ==
- List of cocaine analogues
