= RTI-113 =

Chemical compound

Identifiers
- IUPAC name: Phenyl (2S,3S)-3-(4-chlorophenyl)-8-methyl-8-azabicyclo[3.2.1]octane-2-carboxylate
- CAS Number: 146145-17-7; HCl: 141807-57-0
- PubChem CID: 9886801
- ChemSpider: 8062474
- UNII: G6867RWN6N
- ChEMBL: ChEMBL608548
- CompTox Dashboard (EPA): DTXSID301028557

Chemical and physical data
- Formula: C_{21}H_{22}ClNO_{2}
- Molar mass: 355.86 g·mol^{−1}
- 3D model (JSmol): Interactive image
- SMILES: CN1C2CCC1[C@H]([C@H](C2)C3=CC=C(C=C3)Cl)C(=O)OC4=CC=CC=C4
- InChI: InChI=1S/C21H22ClNO2/c1-23-16-11-12-19(23)20(21(24)25-17-5-3-2-4-6-17)18(13-16)14-7-9-15(22)10-8-14/h2-10,16,18-20H,11-13H2,1H3/t16?,18-,19?,20+/m1/s1; Key:AAEKULYONKUBOZ-MLFFRYNPSA-N

RTI(-4229)-113 (2β-carbophenoxy-3β-(4-chlorophenyl)tropane) is a stimulant drug which acts as a potent and fully selective dopamine reuptake inhibitor (DRI). It has been suggested as a possible substitute drug for the treatment of cocaine addiction. "RTI-113 has properties that make it an ideal medication for cocaine abusers, such as an equivalent efficacy, a higher potency, and a longer duration of action as compared to cocaine." Replacing the methyl ester in RTI-31 with a phenyl ester makes the resultant RTI-113 fully DAT specific. RTI-113 is a particularly relevant phenyltropane cocaine analog that has been tested on squirrel monkeys. RTI-113 has also been tested against cocaine in self-administration studies for DAT occupancy by PET on awake rhesus monkeys. The efficacy of cocaine analogs to elicit self-administration is closely related to the rate at which they are administered. Slower onset of action analogs are less likely to function as positive reinforcers than analogues that have a faster rate of onset.

In order for a DRI such as cocaine to induce euphoria PET scans on primates reveal that the DAT occupancy needs to be >60%. Limited reinforcement may be desirable because it can help with patient compliance. DAT occupancy was between 65 and 76% and 94-99% for doses of cocaine and RTI-113 that maintained maximum response rates, respectively. Whereas cocaine is a fast acting rapidly metabolized DRI, RTI-113 has a longer duration span.

Self-administration graphs are inverted U-shaped. More doses of cocaine need to be administered per session than for RTI-113 because cocaine doesn't last as long as RTI-113 does. It is easy to form the rash judgement that the NRI and SRI properties of cocaine are somehow having an additive effect on provoking self-administration of cocaine.

Although NRIs are known to inhibit DA reuptake in the prefrontal cortex where DATs are low in number, the fact that desipramine is not reliably self-administered makes it unlikely that NRIs are contributing to the addictive character of cocaine.

The 5-HT receptors are very complex to understand and can either mediate or inhibit DA release.

However, on the whole, it is understood that synaptic 5-HT counterbalances catecholamine release.

Thus, it can said with relative certainty that the DAT is responsible for the bulk of the reinforcing effects of cocaine and related stimulants.

With regard to amphetamine, a recent paper disputes this claim, and makes the point that the role of NE is completely underrated.

Another paper was also recently published, seeking to address the relevance of NE in cocaine pharmacology.

== Transporter Selectivity ==
MAT IC_{50} (and K_{i}) for simple phenyltropanes with 1R,2S,3S stereochemistry.
Compound	[^{3}H]CFT	[^{3}H]DA	[^{3}H]Nisoxetine	[^{3}H]NE	[^{3}H]Paroxetine	[^{3}H]5-HT
Cocaine	89.1	275 cf. 241	3300 (1990)	119 cf. 161	1050 (45)	177 cf. 112
Troparil	23	49.8	920 (550)	37.2	1960 (178)	173
WIN 35428	13.9	23.0	835 (503)	38.6	692 (63)	101
RTI-31	1.1	3.68	37 (22)	5.86	44.5 (4.0)	5.00
RTI-113	1.98	5.25	2,926	242	2,340	391
RTI-51	1.7	?	37.4 (23)	?	10.6 (0.96)	?
RTI-55	1.3	1.96	36 (22)	7.51	4.21 (0.38)	1.74
RTI-32	1.7	7.02	60 (36)	8.42	240 (23)	19.4

Note: cocaine has a very strong Ki value for the 5-HT_{3} receptor.

Threo-methylphenidate is a weaker dopaminergic than troparil, even though it is a more potent noradrenergic.

Troparil is the only tropane in the above table having a [^{3}H]NE figure that is smaller than the [^{3}H]DA number.
