= RTI-31 =

Chemical compound

Clinical data
- Other names: RTI-4229-31; (–)-2β-carbomethoxy-3β-(4'-chlorophenyl)tropane

Identifiers
- IUPAC name: Methyl (1R,2S,3S,5S)-3-(4-chlorophenyl)-8-methyl-8-azabicyclo[3.2.1]octane-2-carboxylate
- CAS Number: 130342-80-2
- PubChem CID: 644015
- ChemSpider: 559091
- UNII: XGP6NM44D2
- CompTox Dashboard (EPA): DTXSID10926686

Chemical and physical data
- Formula: C_{16}H_{20}ClNO_{2}
- Molar mass: 293.79 g·mol^{−1}
- 3D model (JSmol): Interactive image
- SMILES: CN1[C@H]2CC[C@@H]1[C@H]([C@H](C2)C3=CC=C(C=C3)Cl)C(=O)OC
- InChI: InChI=1S/C16H20ClNO2/c1-18-12-7-8-14(18)15(16(19)20-2)13(9-12)10-3-5-11(17)6-4-10/h3-6,12-15H,7-9H2,1-2H3/t12-,13+,14+,15-/m0/s1; Key:ZEOHVQFWFVMPGM-YJNKXOJESA-N

RTI-31 ((–)-2β-carbomethoxy-3β-(4'-chlorophenyl)tropane) is a synthetic analog of cocaine that acts as a stimulant. Semi-synthesis of this compound is dependent upon the availability of cocaine starting material. According to the article, RTI-31 is 64 times the strength of cocaine in terms of its potency to elicit self-administration in monkeys. WIN 35428 was 6 times weaker than RTI-31, whereas RTI-51 was 2.6 times weaker than RTI-31.

A further advantage, in addition to potency of this compound, is that its duration of activity is longer than for cocaine. It could therefore be considered within the context as an agonist based therapy for treating cocaine addiction, although it is actually RTI-336 that entered into clinical trials with this in mind. RTI-31 is already completely psychoactive in its own right meaning that further chemical manipulation should be viewed as an option that is not strictly necessary. RTI-336 is actually made using RTI-31 as starting material. RTI-31 is not an entirely selective DRI in that it also has appreciable SERT and NET blocking affinity. RTI-31 can easily be "cleaned" though, as is done, for instance, by replacing the carbomethoxy ester with a more sterically occluded substituent such as is done for RTI-113.

== Binding and uptake selectivity ==
Based on the uptake of tritiated biogenic monoamine radiotracers it can be confirmed by observing the figures in the attached table that RTI-31 is a relatively balanced reuptake inhibitor wrt the D/N/S ratio.

The binding ligand affinities for the different transporters is skewed somewhat in favor of the DAT; there may be some bias in the data. The reason for this could be that WIN35428 is relatively easier to displace from the DAT versus paroxetine from the SERT, because of the higher binding constant of the former compound.

Also it needs to be borne in mind the idea of transporter promiscuity. It may be possible that the NE levels are raised, at least in part, through DAT blockade.

RTI-31 lies somewhere in the middle of the table between troparil on one end and RTI-55 on the other. It is not as selective as RTI-113 for the DAT, but is more selective than dichloropane is for this transporter. RTI-31 also has some muscarinic acetylcholine agonist activity.

MAT IC_{50} (and K_{i}) for simple phenyltropanes with 1R,2S,3S stereochemistry.
Compound	[^{3}H]CFT	[^{3}H]DA	[^{3}H]Nisoxetine	[^{3}H]NE	[^{3}H]Paroxetine	[^{3}H]5-HT
Cocaine	89.1	275 cf. 241	3300 (1990)	119 cf. 161	1050 (45)	177 cf. 112
Troparil	23	49.8	920 (550)	37.2	1960 (178)	173
WIN 35428	13.9	23.0	835 (503)	38.6	692 (63)	101
RTI-31	1.1	3.68	37 (22)	5.86	44.5 (4.0)	5.00
RTI-113	1.98	5.25	2,926	242	2,340	391
RTI-51	1.7	?	37.4 (23)	?	10.6 (0.96)	?
RTI-55	1.3	1.96	36 (22)	7.51	4.21 (0.38)	1.74
RTI-32	1.7	7.02	60 (36)	8.42	240 (23)	19.4

Data in Above table from rats brains (1995). More recent work has advocated using cloned human transporters.

== See also ==
- (+)-CPCA
- RTI-336
- RTI-113
- McN-5292
