= RTI-274 =

Chemical compound

Identifiers
- IUPAC name: 2β-([3,4-Methylenedioxy)phenoxy]methyl)-3α-(4-fluorophenyl)nortropane
- CAS Number: 201472-92-6
- PubChem CID: 22896771; 44320179
- ChEMBL: ChEMBL312977
- CompTox Dashboard (EPA): DTXSID501045668

Chemical and physical data
- Formula: C_{21}H_{22}FNO_{3}
- Molar mass: 355.409 g·mol^{−1}
- 3D model (JSmol): Interactive image; Interactive image
- SMILES: c4cc1OCOc1cc4OCC2C(c3ccc(F)cc3)CC5NC2CC5; C1CC2[C@@H]([C@@H](CC1N2)C3=CC=C(C=C3)F)COC4=CC5=C(C=C4)OCO5
- InChI: InChI=1S/C21H22FNO3/c22-14-3-1-13(2-4-14)17-9-15-5-7-19(23-15)18(17)11-24-16-6-8-20-21(10-16)26-12-25-20/h1-4,6,8,10,15,17-19,23H,5,7,9,11-12H2; Key:HAHQKXHPHSTOFJ-UHFFFAOYSA-N

RTI(-4229)-274, or 2β-((3,4-Methylenedioxyphenoxy)methyl)-3α-(4-fluorophenyl)nortropane is a phenyltropane homologue of paroxetine developed by the group led by F Ivy Carroll in the 1990s.

== Introduction ==
Very few esters of phenyltropanes are actually known to have been reported.

NS2330 and NS2359 both have α,β stereochemistry.

NS2214 appears to have been abandoned now, RTI-336 was their latest compound.

RTI decided that they wanted to make all 8 stereoisomers of the phenyltropane paroxetine homolog.

MAT IC50 (nM) Nor/tropane-Paroxetine Hybrids
Compound		[^{3}H]CFT	[^{3}H]Paroxetine	[^{3}H]Nisoxetine
Paroxetine		? → 623	? → 0.28	? → 535
R	"β,β"	308 → 835	294 → 480	5,300 → 37,400
R	α,β	172 → 142	52.9 → 90	26,600 → 2,500
R	β,α	3.01 → 3.86	422 → 5.62	123 → 14.4
S	"β,β"	1,050 → 1,210	88.1 → 424	27,600 → 17,300
S	α,β	1,500 → 27.6	447→ 55.8	2,916 → 1,690
S	β,α	298 → 407	178 → 19	12,400 → 1,990

- N-demethylating the S-α,β (1S,2S,3R) isomer resulted in a 54-fold increase in DAT IC50.

In the case of nocaine it is understood that the SR enantiomer is the one that should be demethylated if it is wanted to improve DAT affinity.

That is the same enantiomer that is used in the production of paroxetine.

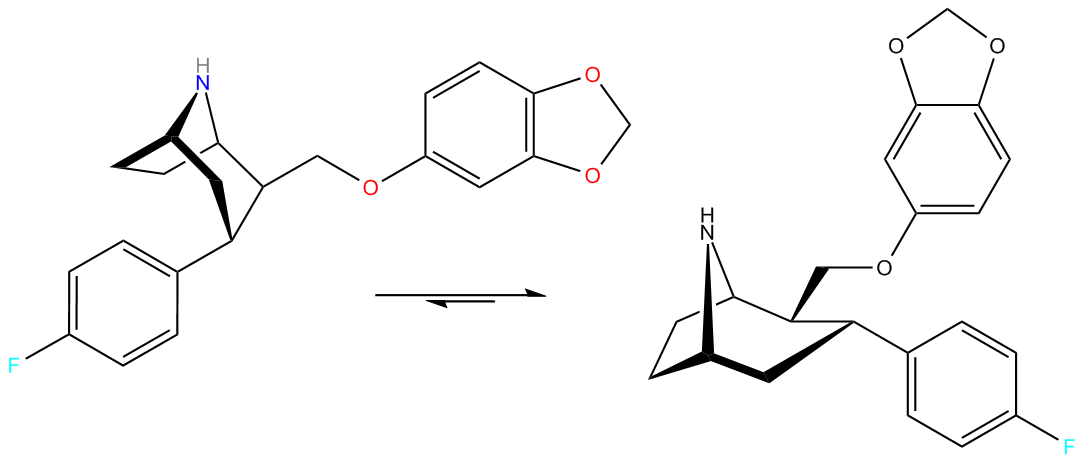

== Skeletal rearrangement ==
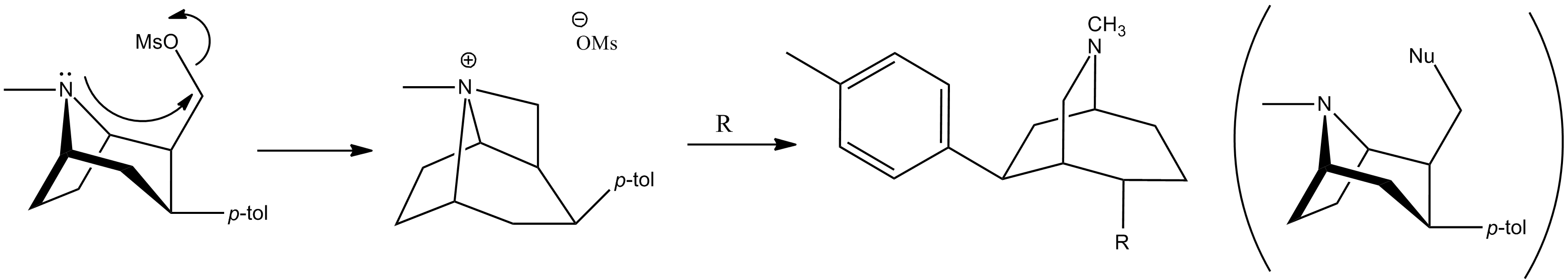

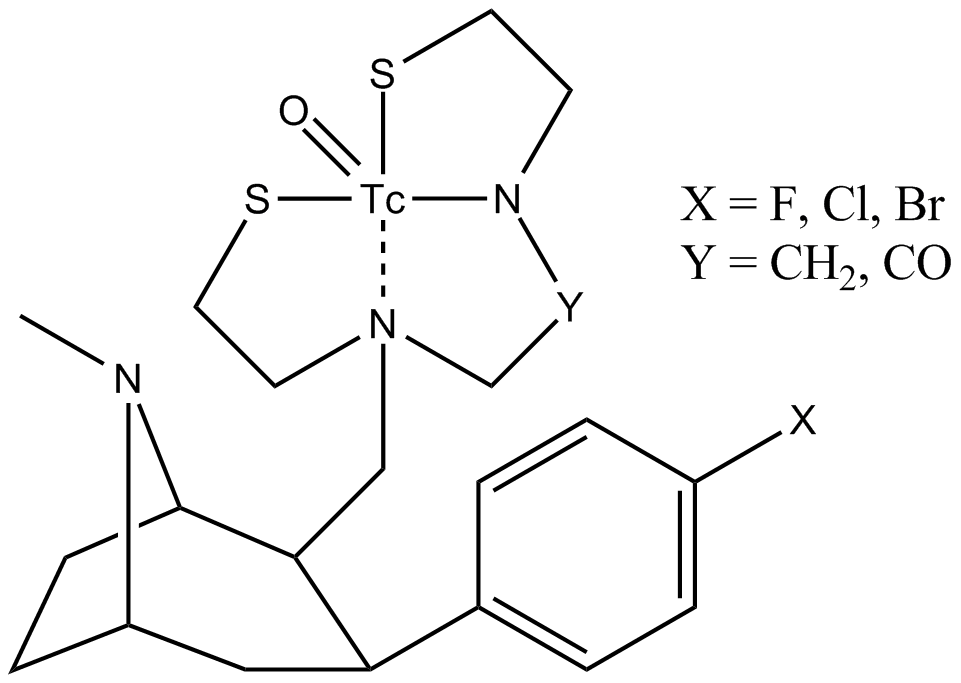

Four years later, some unrelated authors cited a skeletal rearrangement as accounting for this. Diagram

Notice that they are not only interested in ethers, but nitrogen containing Nu's ("TRODAT")

The metal is called "Technetium" and is bound by a chelating agent.

The authors state that at first the acid is halogenated, the amide is prepared, and reduced.

== Erratum ==
Taxil Synthesis

(a) (1) 1-chloroethyl chloroformate, 1,2-dichloroethane, reflux; (2) MeOH reflux; (b) p-toluenesulfonyl chloride, triethylamine; (c) LiAlH_{4}, THF, rt; (d) trifluoromethanesulfonic anhydride, pyridine, CH_{2}Cl_{2}; (e) Na, sesamol, THF; (f) 5% Na/Hg amalgam, Na_{2}HPO_{4}, MeOH.

MAT IC50 (K_{i}) N-Methyl → De-methyl
Compound	[^{3}H]CFT	[^{3}H]Nisoxetine	[^{3}H]paroxetine
R-β,β	? → 3	? → 2 (0.2)	? → 6 (4)
S-β,β	? → ?	? → ? (?)	? → ? (?)
R-"nonane"	308 → 835	294 (27) → 480 (44)	5,300 (3200) → 37,400 (22,500)
S-"nonane"	1050 → 1210	88 (8) → 424 (39)	27,600 (16,600) → 17,300 (10,400)

To solve the problem of the unexpected aza-bicyclo[3.2.2]nonane rearrangement product, the original synthesis had to be modified as follows; WIN 35428 was N-demethylated and then the NH amine was reacted with a suitable protecting group so that N is no longer nucleophilic. In their case they used a tosyl.

== See also ==
- List of phenyltropanes
