= RTI-177 =

Chemical compound

Identifiers
- IUPAC name: (1R,2S,3S,5S)-3-(4-Chlorophenyl)-8-methyl-2-(3-phenyl-1,2-oxazol-5-yl)-8-azabicyclo[3.2.1]octane
- CAS Number: 171236-00-3; HCl: 170939-95-4
- PubChem CID: 9821147
- ChemSpider: 7996896
- UNII: 8VL7AW8T35
- ChEMBL: ChEMBL298580

Chemical and physical data
- Formula: C_{23}H_{23}ClN_{2}O
- Molar mass: 378.90 g·mol^{−1}
- 3D model (JSmol): Interactive image
- SMILES: CN1[C@H]2CC[C@@H]1[C@H]([C@H](C2)C3=CC=C(C=C3)Cl)C4=CC(=NO4)C5=CC=CC=C5
- InChI: InChI=1S/C23H23ClN2O/c1-26-18-11-12-21(26)23(19(13-18)15-7-9-17(24)10-8-15)22-14-20(25-27-22)16-5-3-2-4-6-16/h2-10,14,18-19,21,23H,11-13H2,1H3/t18-,19+,21+,23-/m0/s1; Key:ZGCYMNJHHKQEGA-KPYOPSEVSA-N

RTI(-4229)-177 (2β-(3-phenylisoxazol-5-yl)-3β-(4-chlorophenyl)tropane, β-CPPIT) is a synthetic stimulant drug from the phenyltropane family, which acts as a DRI with micromolar affinity for the SERT. RTI-177 has an unusually long duration of action of 20 hours or more, substantially longer than the related compound RTI-336 from which it differs in molecular structure only by the absence of a p-methyl group.

"the nonselective monoamine transporter inhibitor RTI-126 and the DAT-selective inhibitors RTI-150 and RTI-336 both had a faster rate of onset (30 min) and a short duration of action (4h). In contrast, the nonselective monoamine transporter inhibitor RTI-112 had a slower rate of onset (30–60 min) and a longer duration of action (10h). The DAT-selective inhibitors RTI-171 and RTI-177 also had slower rates of onset (30–120 min), but RTI-171 had a short duration of action (2.5 h) while RTI-177 had a very long duration of action (20 h)."

== Comparison of six MAT inhibitors ==
RTI	X	R	[^{3}H]CFT	[^{3}H]Nisoxetine	[^{3}H]Paroxetine
Coc	—	—	89.1	3298 (1986)	1045 (45)
177	Cl	phenyl	1.28	504 (304)	2420 (220)
176	Me	phenyl	1.58	398 (239)	5110 (465)
354	Me	ethyl	1.62	299 (180)	6400 (582)
336	Cl	p-cresyl	4.09	1714 (1033)	5741 (522)
386	Me	p-anisoyl	3.93	756 (450)	4027 (380)

RTI-336

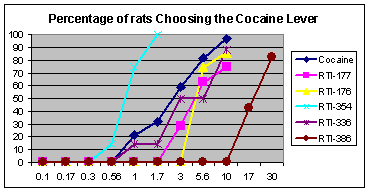

In the Lindsey paper, RTI-177 was wrongly considered to be a dual inhibitor of the NET, although this was later found out to be incorrect.

"In acute toxicity studies in male rats, 3β-(4-chlorophenyl)-2β-[3-(4’-methylphenyl)isoxazol-5-yl]tropane (RTI-336) possessed an LD50 of 180 mg/kg after oral administration, compared with 49 mg/kg for RTI-177 (unpublished results, Howell 2005; Table 9). These results suggested that RTI-336 was a better candidate than RTI-177 for further preclinical development."

Also the potency of the heterocyclic compounds is not as great as would be predicted based on in vitro test results.
