= Alan P. Kozikowski =

Medicinal chemist

Alan P. Kozikowski, Ph.D.
- Education: University of Michigan, University of California at Berkeley, Harvard University
- Scientific career
- Fields: medicinal chemistry, organic chemistry, drug discovery
- Workplaces: University of Pittsburgh, Mayo Clinic, Georgetown University Medical Center, University of Illinois
- Thesis: (1974)

Alan P. Kozikowski is an American medicinal chemist, drug designer, and pharmaceutical entrepreneur, best known for his research on 5-HT receptors, and GSK-3 inhibitors. He is an author of a book Drug Design for Neuroscience. He has over 100 patents, over 550 publications.

== Education and Postdoctoral research ==
Kozikowski received a PhD in organic chemistry at the University of California, Berkeley. During his post-doctoral at Harvard University, he worked on organic synthesis under the supervision of Nobel laureate E.J. Corey.

== Research career ==
Kozikowski began his career as an organic chemist at the University of Pittsburgh. Later, following his interest in the applications of chemistry to biological problems, he joined the Mayo Clinic, and drug discovery program at the Georgetown University Medical Center. During this period his team was the first to synthesize the naturally occurring alkaloid Huperzine A, an AChE inhibitor that has memory-enhancing properties, and may be useful for the treatment of Alzheimer's disease. His team also worked on various psychotropic agents such as cocaine analogs, like Nocaine, which can potentially be used to treat stimulant addiction, and on Phencyclidine analogs to treat mental health disorders.

After a decade at Georgetown, Kozikowski accepted a position at the University of Illinois, where his team researched activity of different GSK-3β inhibitors to treat bipolar disorder. One of the compounds, 9-ING-41 (Elraglusib), is believed to be effective for multiple types of cancer, a discovery that was commercialized as Actuate Therapeutics Inc.

He is also a founder of StarWise Therapeutics LLC, where new HDAC6 inhibitors were developed to treat Charcot-Marie-Tooth disease. Currently, Kozikowski is working in Bright Minds Biosciences to develop new psychedelic-based compounds to treat mental health disorders and cluster headaches.

Kozikowski has been noted for his criticism of current drug discovery programs in psychiatry and potential overmedicalization.

In addition to all of the above, Kozikowski's work contributed to the discovery of the following compounds:

1. HBL20017 & HBL20016.
2. Studies on nicotinic agonists paved the way for such discoveries as hydroxy-epibatidine (epibatidol), Sazetidine A (Saz-A), LF-3-88 & LF-3-80, and later VMY-2-95 (not directly Kozikowski but still Georgetown).
3. Studies on nocaine led to JZ-III-84 & JZ-IV-10 & JZAD-IV-22 & DMNPC.
4. Earlier studies on RTI-31 led to a piperidine homolog that is called 1-Methyl-3-propyl-4-(p-chlorophenyl)piperidine.
5. SW-101
6. Tubastatin A
7. Elevenostat
8. Nexturastat A
9. CAY10603
10. SS-208
11. FGIN-127 & FGIN-143
12. Mevastatin synthesis:
13. Actinobolin synthesis:
14. Cyclopiazonic acid synthesis:
15. 8A-PDHQ
16. A flazalone QSAR was reported; the most potent analog was called diclazalone and had DRI properties that may be useful in treating cocaine addictions.
