= RTI-120 =

Chemical compound

Identifiers
- IUPAC name: Phenyl (1R,2S,3S,5S)-3-(4-methylphenyl)-8-methyl-8-azabicyclo[3.2.1]octane-2-carboxylate
- CAS Number: 146145-20-2
- PubChem CID: 10109793
- ChemSpider: 34948082
- UNII: 532Y5K4NMA
- CompTox Dashboard (EPA): DTXSID80569584

Chemical and physical data
- Formula: C_{22}H_{25}NO_{2}
- Molar mass: 335.447 g·mol^{−1}
- 3D model (JSmol): Interactive image
- SMILES: CN1[C@@H]2C[C@H](C3=CC=C(C)C=C3)[C@H](C(OC4=CC=CC=C4)=O)[C@H]1CC2
- InChI: InChI=1S/C22H25NO2/c1-15-8-10-16(11-9-15)19-14-17-12-13-20(23(17)2)21(19)22(24)25-18-6-4-3-5-7-18/h3-11,17,19-21H,12-14H2,1-2H3/t17-,19+,20+,21-/m0/s1; Key:HIQHQNWJRSNELD-KCLUMXDGSA-N

RTI-120 ((–)-2β-carbophenoxy-3β-(p-tolyl)tropane or RTI-4229-120) is a phenyltropane derivative which acts as a reasonably selective dopamine reuptake inhibitor, along with weaker inhibition of noradrenaline and serotonin reuptake. It has a reasonably fast rate of occupancy of dopamine transporters in the brain, though slower than that of cocaine itself. RTI-120 has a short duration of action, along with other p-methyl substituted phenyltropanes such as RTI-150, RTI-171 and RTI-199, giving it a more similar pharmacological profile to cocaine compared to longer acting analogues like RTI-121 and RTI-177.

== See also ==
- List of phenyltropanes
- RTI-113
