= Streptomyces griseoviridis =

Scientific classification
- Domain: Bacteria
- Kingdom: Bacillati
- Phylum: Actinomycetota
- Class: Actinomycetes
- Order: Streptomycetales
- Family: Streptomycetaceae
- Genus: Streptomyces
- Species: S. griseoviridis

Binomial name
- Streptomyces griseoviridis corrig. Anderson et al. 1956 (Approved Lists 1980)

Type strain
- A 9071, Anderson PD 04955, AS 4.1418, ATCC 23920, BCRC 15101, CBS 904.68, CCRC 15101, CGMCC 4.1418, DSM 40229, ETH 31501, HAMBI 1086, IFO 12874, IMRU 3735, ISP 5229, JCM 4250, JCM 4643, KCC S-0250, KCC S-0643, KCCM 40225, KCCS- 0250, KCCS-0643, KCTC 9780, Lanoot R-8683, LMG 19321, NBRC 12874, NCIMB 9853, NRRL 2427, NRRL B-2427 T, NRRL-ISP 5229, P-D 04955, R-8683, RIA 1170, VKM Ac-622

Synonyms
- Streptomyces griseoviridus Anderson et al. 1956 (Approved Lists 1980)

Species of bacterium

Streptomyces griseoviridis is a filamentous bacterium species from the genus Streptomyces, which was isolated from soil in Texas, United States. Streptomyces griseoviridis produces etamycin, griseoviridin, bactobolin, prodigiosin R1, actinobolin, and rosophilin. Streptomyces griseoviridis can be used to protect plants since it inhibits the growth of fungal pathogens.

== See also ==
- List of Streptomyces species
