= RTI-112 =

Synthetic stimulant and triple reuptake inhibitor

Identifiers
- IUPAC name: Methyl (1R,2S,3S,5S)-3-(4-chloro-3-methylphenyl)-8-methyl-8-azabicyclo[3.2.1]octane-2-carboxylate
- CAS Number: 143982-09-6; HCl: 150653-92-2
- PubChem CID: 9972515
- ChemSpider: 8148107
- UNII: TDD7WP3S39
- ChEMBL: ChEMBL1812745
- CompTox Dashboard (EPA): DTXSID50432655

Chemical and physical data
- Formula: C_{17}H_{22}ClNO_{2}
- Molar mass: 307.82 g·mol^{−1}
- 3D model (JSmol): Interactive image
- SMILES: CC1=C(C=CC(=C1)[C@H]2C[C@@H]3CC[C@H]([C@H]2C(=O)OC)N3C)Cl
- InChI: InChI=1S/C17H22ClNO2/c1-10-8-11(4-6-14(10)18)13-9-12-5-7-15(19(12)2)16(13)17(20)21-3/h4,6,8,12-13,15-16H,5,7,9H2,1-3H3/t12-,13+,15+,16-/m0/s1; Key:VMITZEMDDZVHBZ-XNISGKROSA-N

RTI(-4229)-112 (2β-carbomethoxy-3β-(3-methyl-4-chlorophenyl)tropane) is a synthetic stimulant drug from the phenyltropane family. It is primarily used in scientific research to study the brain's reward system. In contrast to more well-known stimulants that primarily affect one type of brain cell communication, RTI-112 is a nonselective triple reuptake inhibitor. This means it simultaneously affects three important brain chemicals: serotonin, dopamine, and norepinephrine.

In vitro tests show a very similar serotonin transporter (SERT)/dopamine transporter (DAT)/norepinephrine transporter (NET) selectivity to cocaine, although in vivo behaviour is different:

"The nonselective monoamine transporter inhibitor RTI-126 and the DAT-selective inhibitors RTI-150 and RTI-336 both had a faster rate of onset (30 min) and a short duration of action (4h). In contrast, the nonselective monoamine transporter inhibitor RTI-112 had a slower rate of onset (30–60 min) and a longer duration of action (10h). The DAT-selective inhibitors RTI-171 and RTI-177 also had slower rates of onset (30–120 min), but RTI-171 had a short duration of action (2.5 h) while RTI-177 had a very long duration of action (20 h)."

The efficacy of cocaine analogs to elicit self-administration is related to the rate at which they are administered. Slower onset analogs are less likely to function as behavioral stimulants than analogs eliciting a faster rate of onset. Nonselective analogs are less likely to function as "reinforcers" than reuptake inhibitors that have DAT specificity.

In order for a dopamine reuptake inhibitor (DRI) such as cocaine to induce euphoria, PET scans on primates reveal that the DAT occupancy needs to be >60%.

RTI-112 has equipotent in vitro affinity at the SERT, NET and DAT, respectively. RTI-112 was not reliably self-administered, in contrast to the DAT selective reuptake inhibitors that were used in this study.

In vivo at the ED50, RTI-112 had no DAT occupancy at all. At the ED50, almost all of the RTI-112 occupied the SERT at this dose. A significantly higher dose was required to get >70% DAT occupancy in the case of RTI-112; however, RTI-112 was still able to suppress cocaine administration at the ED50, suggesting a serotonergic mechanism was responsible for this.
