= (+)-CPCA =

Stimulant drug

Clinical data
- ATC code: none

Identifiers
- IUPAC name: Methyl (3R,4S)-4-(4-chlorophenyl)-1-methylpiperidine-3-carboxylate
- CAS Number: 263769-22-8
- PubChem CID: 10333222
- ChemSpider: 8508681
- CompTox Dashboard (EPA): DTXSID80180975

Chemical and physical data
- Formula: C_{14}H_{18}ClNO_{2}
- Molar mass: 267.75 g·mol^{−1}
- 3D model (JSmol): Interactive image
- SMILES: Clc1ccc(cc1)[C@@H]2[C@@H](C(=O)OC)CN(C)CC2
- InChI: InChI=1S/C14H18ClNO2/c1-16-8-7-12(13(9-16)14(17)18-2)10-3-5-11(15)6-4-10/h3-6,12-13H,7-9H2,1-2H3/t12-,13+/m1/s1; Key:GDFVYUDIAQQDTA-OLZOCXBDSA-N

(+)-CPCA (also known as nocaine, 3α-carbomethoxy-4β-(4-chlorophenyl)-N-methylpiperidine, or CTDP 31,446) is a stimulant drug similar in structure to pethidine (an opioid that possesses NDRI actions) and to RTI-31, but nocaine lacks the two-carbon bridge of RTI-31's tropane skeleton. This compound was first developed as a substitute agent for cocaine.

The nocaine family includes a diverse assortment of piperidine based cocaine mimetics. The parent compound nocaine was developed in an attempt to create a substitute drug for cocaine for the treatment of addiction, and was found to substitute for cocaine in animal models while having significantly less abuse potential.

== Background ==
Although Kozikowski reported compound with chlorine in 1998, plain phenyl was reported earlier than this by John Plati.

There are several novel ways to produce these compounds, but background stems from arecoline chemistry. This is analogous to the phenyltropanes which use Methylecgonidine.

Paroxetine (Paxil) and femoxetine were also developed using arecoline conjugate additions of aromatic moieties. These are serotonin based antidepressants though, whereas Kozikowski's team was the first to highlight activity at the DAT.

Further nocaine derivatives were developed for treating addiction from Kozikowski's teachings. Smith specifically states that the butyrophenone analog of nocaine is an active agent, as well as specifying pthalimide type alkylamino agents.

Butyrophenone-Nocaine

Further support lends a scale-up process that also relies on arecoline, which is toxic and already active pharmaceutical salt:

The ketanserin analog devised by Peter Meltzer uses an altogether different methodology of synthesis: The same procedure was employed years earlier for GSK1360707F, and was known from before this from RTI diaryltropanes. Thus, these methods are now well known in the art and do not necessarily rely on the use of arecoline as a starting material.

The Warner-Lambert Butler synthesis for example uses a 4-phenylnicotinic acid starting material: citing:

One of the more promising methods of synthesis relies on a protocol that was taken for paroxetine. This is known as the Czibula procedure and was patented. {Note: can't go directly from syn alcohols to syn ethers due to rearrangement and therefore need tosyl group. Same problem arose with RTI-274.}

Another protocol is the pigs liver enzyme (PLE) protocol.

=== 3',4'-Dichlorophenyl group ===
The method of improving the binding by the use of a 3',4'-dichlorophenyl group is reported in several patents.

1. piperidine-brasofensine
2. piperidine-tesofensine
3. Ritalin,
4. Meperidine,
5. sertraline
6. indatraline
7. dichloroisoprenaline
8. sibutramine:
9. mazindol
10. dichloropane
11. tramadol
12. Amitifadine
13. Diclofensine
14. JNJ-7925476
15. venlafaxine

== Pharmacology ==
Like cocaine, (−)-cis-CPCA and (+)-CPCA bind to the dopamine transporter and inhibit dopamine uptake, stimulate motor activity in rodents and completely substitute for cocaine in discrimination tests. Pretreatment with (−)-cis-CPCA or (+)-CPCA enhances the cocaine discriminative stimulus in rats. However, there are a number of differences; the locomotor stimulant effects of the piperidine derivatives are much less than those induced by cocaine, and pretreating mice with (−)-cis-CPCA or (+)-CPCA does not increase cocaine induced convulsions, and actually reduced cocaine induced locomotor stimulation. The (−)-cis-CPCA isomer has similar reinforcing effects to cocaine as shown by fixed-ratio self-administration tests in rats, but (+)-CPCA has a flat dose-response curve, and similarly while (−)-cis-CPCA and cocaine had nearly identical break points in a "punished responding" (?) self-administration test, (+)-CPCA had a lower break point than either of the other drugs.

Monoamine Reuptake Activity (nM)
Compound	[^{3}H]NE	[^{3}H]5-HT	[^{3}H]DA
Cocaine	119	177	275
(−)-cis-CPCA	98	390	67
(+)-CPCA	90	5900	276

The generally lower efficacy of (+)-CPCA in locomotor and methamphetamine discrimination tests could result from the differential selectivity of the two isomers for the DAT relative to the SERT. That is, if serotonin receptor activation is requisite for maximal efficacy, the difference SERT affinity between (−)-cis-CPCA and (+)-CPCA might play a contributory role in accounting for the differences in the observed pharmacology. Catecholamine selective drugs, like TMP (methylphenidate), are reported to possess decent abuse potential though, so it is not easy to gauge why (+)-CPCA does not entice a strong self-administration propensity.

A possible explanation might be nocaine preferentially binds to the ↓ DAT, in which case it would be expected to behave somewhat differently from cocaine. Some sort of cholinergic effect might also be aversive. For example, muscarinic activity of benztropine analogs is known to limit their reinforcing potential. Ion-channel activity is another factor that can be used to explain certain differences in pharmacology.

It is possible that sigma receptor activity might also account for some of the differences between cocaine and these piperidine mimics (R. Matsumoto, et al. 2001, (Ping and Teruo, 2003 rev). Sigma receptors are not specific to cocaine, other psychostimulants like methylphenidate, methamphetamine (E. Nguyen, et al. 2005), and phencyclidine are also linked to this neural target. An increased understanding of this receptor recently led to a novel AD being reported that is based around its pharmacology.

In summary, (+)-CPCA has lower potency and efficacy than cocaine in increasing locomotor activity in rodents. (+)-CPCA only manages to produce partial methamphetamine-like discriminative stimulus effects, although it is fully cocaine-like in cocaine-trained animals. (+)-CPCA has lower reinforcing potential than cocaine as assessed by fixed and progressive ratio IV self-administration tests in rats, with its reinforcing effects confirmed by rhesus monkeys. Furthermore, (+)-CPCA dose dependently antagonizes cocaine-induced locomotion and potentiates the discriminative stimulus effects of a low dose of cocaine. (+)-CPCA, unlike cocaine, does not enhance cocaine-induced convulsions. These results suggest that (+)-CPCA completely mimics certain behavioral actions of cocaine, whereas acting like a weak partial agonist in others, including its ability to attenuate cocaine-induced increase in locomotion and to serve as a positive reinforcing agent in rodents. Thus, (+)-CPCA may have potential utility in the treatment of cocaine addiction, and also offer valuable pharmacological information, furthering our understanding of cocaine's mechanism of action, because it exhibits fundamental differences from other related DARI molecules.

== Chemistry ==
=== Routes of synthesis ===
The arecoline route goes the same as for RTI-31 starting from Methylecgonidine. Trudell lays down the groundwork for the correct procedure that was then heavily patented by SKF.

Patented methods reported

1. Ward & Crowe SKF improved method:

Four theoretical improvements over the earlier historical attempts of the work of Plati & Clarke:

1. The solvent is apolar, whereas for forming the Grignard reagent the solvent needs to be ether, which is removed prior to the conjugate addition.
2. The temperature for forming the Grignard reagent needs to be reflux whereas the temperature needs to be refrigerated for the conjugate addition.
3. A catalytic amount of CuCl can encourage soft over hard addition.
4. Quench conditions (things like strength of acid used, quench temperature and time of quench).

=== Ester and amine modifications ===
A series of novel N- and 3α-modified nocaine analogs were synthesized and tested for their SNDRI activity and behavioral properties in mice.

The rational design of ligands with a predetermined potency at and selectivity for monoamine transporters is hindered by the lack of knowledge about the 3D structure of these targets. In cases where the 3D structure of the binding site in a target protein is not well defined, as is the case for the monoamine transporter proteins, one can perform ligand-based design to develop a pharmacophore. That is, by studying the conformational properties of a series of pharmacologically similar compounds, one can form hypotheses regarding the pharmacophore. Most of the potent tropane-based inhibitors, inc. coca, are believed to have at least 3 major interactions with the transporter binding site: one ionic or H-bonding interaction at the basic nitrogen, one dipole-dipole or H-bonding interaction of the ester group, and an interaction of the aryl group with a lipophilic binding pocket. This model was successfully used for the design of a novel piperidine-based DAT inhibitor, that is economically affordable to manufacture.

Although the in vivo metabolism of (+)-CPCA is also likely to involve N-demethylation, metabolism to the corresponding free acid, to give a compound inactive at all monoamine transporters, will probably be the predominant pathway in vivo. It was reasoned that metabolism via esterase action can be avoided by replacing the ester group with a bioisosteric group that is more stable to metabolic degradation. In previous studies, it was found that oxadiazole, although cocaine-like in activity, exhibits a significantly longer duration of action due to slower rate of metabolism. In general, relative to the corresponding N-methyl compounds, the norpiperidines exhibited an increased activity at the SERT/NET and only modest changes at the DAT.

Ki (nM)
R	NE	DA	5HT
CO_{2}Me	252 → 7.9	233 → 279	8490 → 434
CH2OH	198 → 69	497 → 836	1550 → 239
Oxadiazole	256 → 34	187 → 189	5960 → 373

An interesting difference between cocaine, ester 1a, alcohol 2a, and norester 1b is that the latter two compounds are substantially longer acting than cocaine in locomotor activity tests in mice. Although prolonged action is anticipated from compounds like alcohol 2a and oxadiazole 3a which lack the 3α ester group and so are more difficult to metabolise, this is not expected for the norester 1b, because the 3α ester group should be just as easily hydrolysed as the ester group of cocaine and 1a. Another result of N-demethylation is an initial depressant action of 1b followed by delayed locomotor stimulation, which might be due to interaction with GABA receptors or mGlu5.

=== 3β-substituted nocaine ligand design ===
In an earlier study, it was found that 3α-amido and bulky 3α-oxadiazoyl nocaine ligands, which possess greater stability relative to the ester functional group, and are therefore more attractive as potential therapies, are inactive. This result led to the hypothesis that the binding site of the DAT and NET in close proximity to the 3α-position of the piperidine ring is compact and cannot accommodate bulky, sterically occluded substituents, like the 3-substituted 1,2,4-oxadiazolyl groups. It was reasoned that introduction of a methylene spacer would confer improved monoamine transporter binding affinity upon the resultant molecules.

Structure of 3α-Substituted nocaine

R	[^{3}H]DA	[^{3}H]5-HT	[^{3}H]NE
CO_{2}Me	233	8490	252
CONMe_{2}	2140	18900	569
CH_{2}OAc	599	901	235
CH_{2}OCH_{2}CH=CH_{2}	60	231	20
CH_{2}CO_{2}Et	79	191	101
CH_{2}CONMe_{2}	16	1994	46
Heterocycle	44	32	52
CH_{2}CH_{2}CO_{2}Me	68	255	31
trans-CH=CHCO_{2}Me	53	501	272
Pr^{n}	20	228	6.5
(CH_{2})_{3}OH	16	2810	564

One of the possible reasons that the C2–C3 compounds are more active than the C1 compounds is that the polar group present in the more flexible 3α-appendage of the C2–C3 ligands is able to avoid unfavorable interactions with the binding site in close proximity to the piperidine ring. For the same reason the appendage in the C2–C3 series may more closely, but not precisely, mimic the binding mode of the more active SS based ligands, and possibly even transfer over to tropane based compounds.

To better understand the difference between the C1 and the C2–C3 series, the compounds were energy minimized and flexibly superimposed on WIN-35,428. The resulting overlay shows that only the C2–C3 ligands are able to adopt a conformation in which the polar group of the 3α-substituent occupies the position proximal to that of the 2β-polar group in WIN35428.

=== Nocaine: sulfur appendage ===
Compound 16e

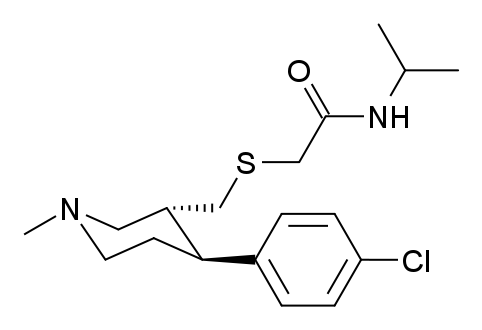

== Pharmacophore ==
A generally recognized pharmacophore model for cocaine and phenyltropanes comprises two electrostatic interactions of the basic nitrogen and the ester group of the C-2 substituent, and one hydrophobic interaction of the C-3 aryl group. This model has been disputed because of the finding that in certain compounds neither the basic N nor the ester group was necessary for high binding affinity and inhibition of MAR. Instead, a hydrophobic pocket was proposed to exist in the vicinity of the C-2 carbon. Carroll et al., however, provided further evidence for an electrostatic interaction at the C-2β-position in a later study.

Other models proposed for the DAT binding site include a linear fashion binding pocket for the 3β-substituted phenyltropane analogs, and a prohibited conical region about 5.5–10 Å distant from the 3α-substituted piperidine ring. Noticeably, high potency at the DAT of dimeric piperidine-based esters and amides suggested that the flexible linker combining the two piperidine units was able to adjust its orientation and to avoid unfavorable interactions with the binding site. All these lines of evidence suggest that the DAT binding site is much more complicated than the proposed pharmacophore models.

In an attempt to uncover the details of the DAT binding site, a number of 3D-QSAR studies were performed. Several QSAR/CoMFA studies focused on phenyltropanes concluded that an increased negative electrostatic potential in the regions around the 3β-substituent of the tropane ring and the para-position of the phenyl ring favored high potency in inhibiting the MATs. Wright et al. studied the role of the 3β-substituent of tropanes in binding to the DAT and blocking DA re-uptake. Their CoMFA model indicated that the 3β-substituent binding site is barrel-shaped and hydrophobic interactions make a dominant contribution to the binding, which is consistent with the studies of 3α-substituted tropane analogs reported by Newman et al. Newman and co-authors also studied N-substituted tropanes and concluded that the steric interaction of the N-substituent with the DAT is a principal factor for the binding affinity.

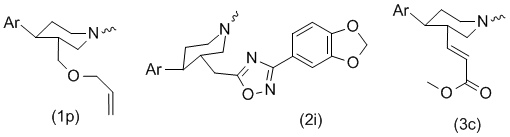

== See also ==
- List of cocaine analogues
- 1-Methyl-3-propyl-4-(p-chlorophenyl)piperidine
- N,O-Dimethyl-4-(2-naphthyl)piperidine-3-carboxylate
- JZ-IV-10 and other modafinil hybrids
- 4-Fluoropethidine and other pethidine (meperidine) analogues.
- NET selective.
- Computer.
