= RTI-32 =

Chemical compound

Identifiers
- IUPAC name: Methyl (1R,2S,3S,5S)-8-methyl-3-(4-methylphenyl)-8-azabicyclo[3.2.1]octane-2-carboxylate
- CAS Number: 130342-81-3
- PubChem CID: 125416
- ChemSpider: 111596
- ChEMBL: ChEMBL1947089
- CompTox Dashboard (EPA): DTXSID70926687

Chemical and physical data
- Formula: C_{17}H_{23}NO_{2}
- Molar mass: 273.376 g·mol^{−1}
- 3D model (JSmol): Interactive image
- SMILES: CC1=CC=C(C=C1)[C@H]2C[C@@H]3CC[C@H]([C@H]2C(=O)OC)N3C
- InChI: InChI=1S/C17H23NO2/c1-11-4-6-12(7-5-11)14-10-13-8-9-15(18(13)2)16(14)17(19)20-3/h4-7,13-16H,8-10H2,1-3H3/t13-,14+,15+,16-/m0/s1; Key:MMKZDDDDODERSJ-JJXSEGSLSA-N

(–)-2β-Carbomethoxy-3β-(4-tolyl)tropane (RTI-4229-32, tolpane) is a phenyltropane-based cocaine analogue that has similar properties in vitro to related drugs such as RTI-31.

Comparison of Data
Compound	DAT	DA	NET	NA	SERT	5HT	ED50
Troparil	23	49.8	550	37.2	178	173	0.34
RTI-32	1.7	7.02	36	8.42	23	19.4	0.31
RTI-31	1.1	3.68	22	5.86	4.0	5.0	0.13
3'4'-xylyl	0.43	unknown	44	unknown	2.42	unknown	

== See also ==
- 2β-Propanoyl-3β-(4-tolyl)-tropane
- RTI-120
- RTI-150
- List of cocaine analogues
