= 1-Methyl-3-propyl-4-(p-chlorophenyl)piperidine =

Chemical compound

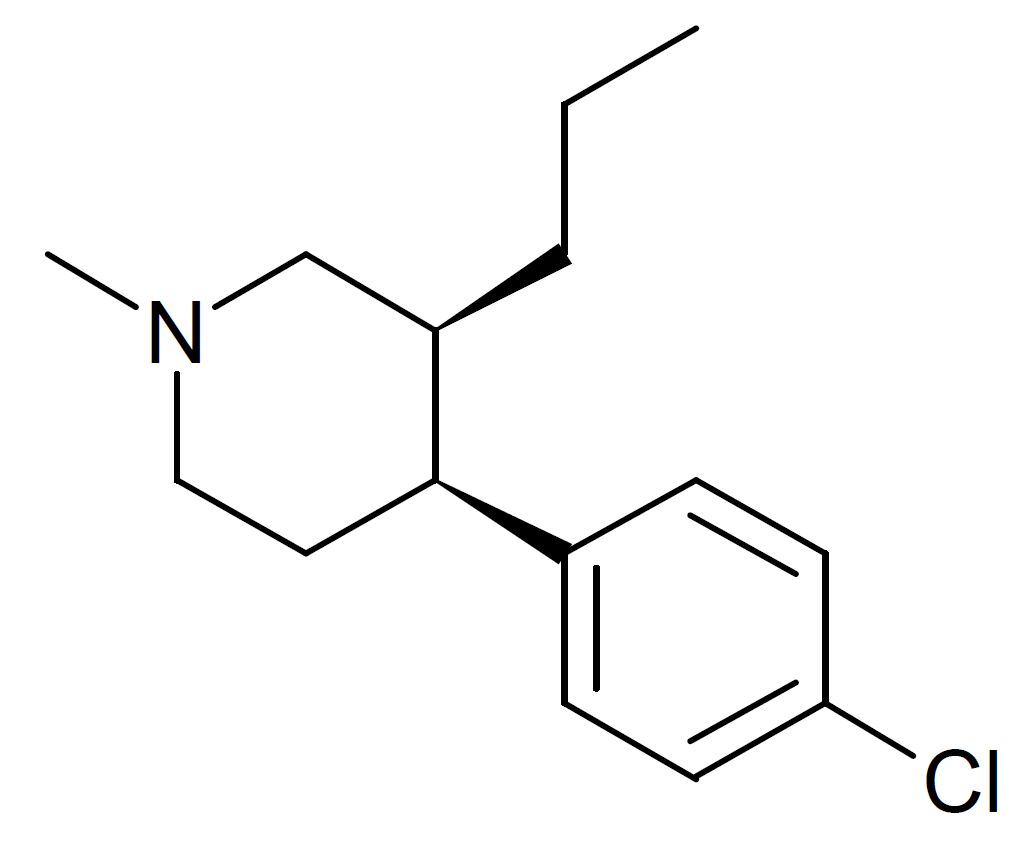

Identifiers
- IUPAC name: (3S,4S)-4-(4-Chloro-phenyl)-1-methyl-3-propyl-piperidine
- CAS Number: 214335-23-6 (3S,4S enantiomer) 1956381-81-9 (racemate)
- PubChem CID: 9837874
- ChemSpider: 8013594
- UNII: PJ74S72YHZ
- ChEMBL: ChEMBL109097

Chemical and physical data
- Formula: C_{15}H_{22}ClN
- Molar mass: 251.80 g·mol^{−1}
- 3D model (JSmol): Interactive image
- SMILES: CCC[C@@H]1CN(CC[C@@H]1C2=CC=C(C=C2)Cl)C
- InChI: InChI=1S/C15H22ClN/c1-3-4-13-11-17(2)10-9-15(13)12-5-7-14(16)8-6-12/h5-8,13,15H,3-4,9-11H2,1-2H3/t13-,15-/m1/s1; Key:MWGRXFWGMDSMNI-UKRRQHHQSA-N

1-Methyl-3-propyl-4-(p-chlorophenyl)piperidine is a drug developed by a team led by Alan Kozikowski, which acts as a potent dopamine reuptake inhibitor, and was developed as a potential therapeutic agent for the treatment of cocaine addiction. As with related compounds such as nocaine, it is a structurally simplified derivative of related phenyltropane compounds. Its activity at the serotonin and noradrenaline transporters has not been published, though most related 4-phenylpiperidine derivatives are relatively selective for inhibiting dopamine reuptake over the other monoamine neurotransmitters. While several of its isomers are active, the (3S,4S)-enantiomer is by far the most potent. The rearranged structural isomer 2-[1-(4-chlorophenyl)butyl]piperidine is also a potent inhibitor of dopamine reuptake.

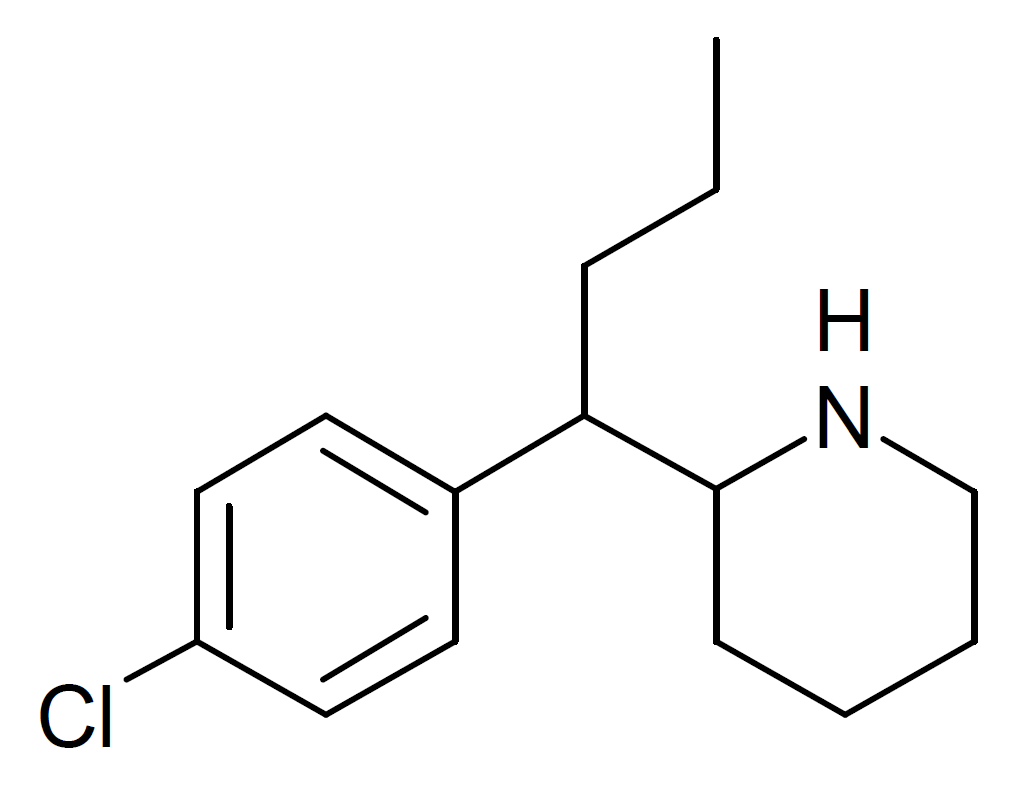
2-[1-(4-chlorophenyl)butyl]piperidine led to CTDP-32476

== See also ==
- 4-Fluoropethidine
- Allylprodine
- JZ-IV-10
- N,O-Dimethyl-4-(2-naphthyl)piperidine-3-carboxylate
- WY-46824
