= C16H20INO2 =

The molecular formula C_{16}H_{20}INO_{2} (molar mass: 385.2406 g/mol, exact mass: 385.0539 u) may refer to:

- RTI-352
- RTI-55, or iometopane
