= RTI-229 =

Chemical compound

Legal status
- Legal status: In general: legal

Identifiers
- IUPAC name: [(1R,2S,3S,5S)-3-(4-Iodophenyl)-8-methyl-8-azabicyclo[3.2.1]octan-2-yl]-pyrrolidin-1-ylmethanone
- CAS Number: 160948-17-4
- PubChem CID: 9910220
- UNII: 4XC2A2NPZ2
- CompTox Dashboard (EPA): DTXSID10432717

Chemical and physical data
- Formula: C_{19}H_{25}IN_{2}O
- Molar mass: 424.326 g·mol^{−1}
- 3D model (JSmol): Interactive image
- SMILES: CN1[C@H]2CC[C@@H]1[C@H]([C@H](C2)C3=CC=C(C=C3)I)C(=O)N4CCCC4

RTI-229, also known as (–)-3β-(4-iodophenyl)tropane-2β-pyrrolidine carboxamide and RTI-4229-229, is a potent and long-lasting stimulant drug which was developed in the 1990s as part of a large group of related analogues from the phenyltropane family. With the combination of two potent dopamine transporter (DAT) binding motifs attached to the tropane ring, the p-iodophenyl group at the 3β-position and a pyrrolidine carboxamide at 2β, RTI-229 has extremely high selectivity for the dopamine transporter (2600x and 4600x selective over NET and 5-HTT respectively) and is one of the most DAT-selective compounds in the RTI series.

== Uses ==
RTI-229 is mainly used in scientific research into the dopamine reuptake transporter, with its extremely high DAT selectivity making it useful for distinguishing between DAT and NET binding sites in the brain to an even greater extent than related compounds such as RTI-121.

== Legal Status ==
RTI-229 is legal throughout the world as of 2010. Some jurisdictions such as the United States, Australia and New Zealand might however consider RTI-229 to be a controlled substance analogue of cocaine on the grounds of its related chemical structure.

== See also ==
- RTI-55
- RTI-160
- List of Phenyltropanes
