= C20H27NO2 =

The molecular formula C_{20}H_{27}NO_{2} (molar mass: 313.43 g/mol, exact mass: 313.2042 u) may refer to:

- LS-115509
- Oxilorphan (L-BC-2605)
- 4-PhPr-3,5-DMA
- RTI-150
