= C22H25NO2 =

The molecular formula C_{22}H_{25}NO_{2} (molar mass: 335.44 g/mol) may refer to:

- JWH-250, or 1-pentyl-3-(2-methoxyphenylacetyl)indole
- JWH-302
- Lobelanine
- RTI-120
- SKF-89976A
