= PMAT =

PMAT may refer to:

- Plasma membrane monoamine transporter (PMAT)
- Four phases of mitosis: prophase, metaphase, anaphase, and telophase:
  - Prophase: Chromatin into chromosomes, the nuclear envelope breaks down, chromosomes attach to spindle fibers by their centromeres.
  - Metaphase: Chromosomes line up along the metaphase plate (center of the cell).
  - Anaphase: Sister chromatids are pulled to opposite poles of the cell.
  - Telophase: Two new nuclear envelopes form, chromosomes unfold into chromatin, cytokinesis can begin.
  - Cytokinesis: The process that finally splits the parent cell into two identical daughter cells.
