= OCT3 =

OCT3 may refer to two genes:

- Oct-4, octamer-binding transcription factor 4, also known as Oct-3 or OCT3
- SLC22A3, solute carrier family 22 member 3, also known as OCT3, for organic cation transporter 3
