= CPCA =

CPCA may refer to:

- (+)-CPCA, a stimulant drug (nocaine, 3α-carbomethoxy-4β-(4-chlorophenyl)-N-methylpiperidine)
- Chinese Patriotic Catholic Association
- Cambridgeshire and Peterborough Combined Authority
