= JZ-IV-10 =

Chemical compound

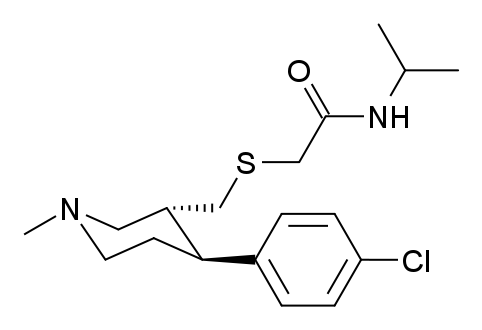

Identifiers
- IUPAC name: (+)-2-([(3R,4S)-1-methyl-4-(4-chlorophenyl)piperidin-3-yl]methylthio)-N-isopropylacetamide
- CAS Number: 807342-16-1
- PubChem CID: 11291199
- ChemSpider: 9466185
- UNII: GYT6ACY5JL
- CompTox Dashboard (EPA): DTXSID201028809

Chemical and physical data
- Formula: C_{18}H_{27}ClN_{2}OS
- Molar mass: 354.94 g·mol^{−1}
- 3D model (JSmol): Interactive image
- SMILES: Clc1ccc(cc1)[C@H]2CCN(C)C[C@@H]2CSCC(=O)NC(C)C
- InChI: InChI=1S/C18H27ClN2OS/c1-13(2)20-18(22)12-23-11-15-10-21(3)9-8-17(15)14-4-6-16(19)7-5-14/h4-7,13,15,17H,8-12H2,1-3H3,(H,20,22)/t15-,17-/m1/s1; Key:GPNABXAHBDYHFE-NVXWUHKLSA-N

JZ-IV-10 is a piperidine derivative related to cocaine which acts as a highly potent serotonin–norepinephrine–dopamine reuptake inhibitor (also called SNDRI, or triple reuptake inhibitor). The eugeroic modafinil was used as a lead to fuel this compound's discovery.

== See also ==
- 1-Methyl-3-propyl-4-(p-chlorophenyl)piperidine
- JJC8-088
- N,O-Dimethyl-4-(2-naphthyl)piperidine-3-carboxylate
- Nocaine
