= RTI-352 =

Names
- IUPAC name Methyl 3α-(4-iodophenyl)tropane-2β-carboxylate
- Systematic IUPAC name Methyl (1R,2S,3R,5S)-3-(4-iodophenyl)-8-methyl-8-azabicyclo[3.2.1]octane-2-carboxylate
- Other names RTI-4229-352

Identifiers
CAS Number	184376-53-2
3D model (JSmol)	Interactive image
ChemSpider	8018798
PubChem CID	9843083
UNII	LZD6F45MKX
CompTox Dashboard (EPA)	DTXSID601126180
- InChI: InChI=1S/C16H20INO2/c1-18-12-7-8-14(18)15(16(19)20-2)13(9-12)10-3-5-11(17)6-4-10/h3-6,12-15H,7-9H2,1-2H3/t12-,13-,14+,15-/m0/s1 Key: SIIICDNNMDMWCI-XQLPTFJDSA-N
- SMILES: CN1[C@H]2CC[C@@H]1[C@@H]([C@@](OC)=O)[C@H]([C@@]3=CC=C(I)C=C3)C2

Properties
Chemical formula	C_{16}H_{20}INO_{2}
Molar mass	385.245 g·mol^{−1}
- Except where otherwise noted, data are given for materials in their standard state (at 25 °C [77 °F], 100 kPa). Infobox references

RTI-352 is a phenyltropane that is used as a radiolabeling ligand for the DAT.

RTI-352 is a geometric isomer of RTI-55 (β-CIT).

Based on X-ray crystallography, this compound is in a tautomeric equilibrium residing mostly on the side of the boat-shaped conformer.
