= Plasma membrane monoamine transporter =

Protein-coding gene in the species Homo sapiens

SLC29A4

Identifiers
- Aliases: SLC29A4, ENT4, PMAT, solute carrier family 29 member 4, Plasma membrane monoamine transporter
- External IDs: OMIM: 609149; MGI: 2385330; GeneCards: SLC29A4

Gene location (Human)
Chr.	Chromosome 7 (human)
Band	7p22.1	Start	5,274,369 bp
Band	7p22.1	End	5,306,912 bp

Gene location (Mouse)
Chr.	Chromosome 5 (mouse)
Band	5|5 G2	Start	142,678,267 bp
Band	5|5 G2	End	142,708,245 bp
RNA expression pattern
Bgee	Human / Mouse (ortholog); Top expressed in: buccal mucosa cell; islet of Langerhans; hypothalamus; internal globus pallidus; ganglionic eminence; anterior cingulate cortex; right frontal lobe; external globus pallidus; substantia nigra; lateral nuclear group of thalamus / Top expressed in: Epithelium of choroid plexus; dentate gyrus of hippocampal formation granule cell; neural tube; facial motor nucleus; cerebellar cortex; ganglionic eminence; ventricular zone; external carotid artery; primary visual cortex; internal carotid artery; More reference expression data
BioGPS	n/a
Gene ontology
Molecular function	monoamine transmembrane transporter activity; nucleoside transmembrane transporter activity
Cellular component	integral component of membrane; plasma membrane; apical plasma membrane; membrane
Biological process	nucleoside transmembrane transport; monoamine transport; transmembrane transport
Sources:Amigo / QuickGO
Orthologs
Databases	NCBI: entry; OMA: entry
Species	Human	Mouse
Entrez	222962	243328
Ensembl	ENSG00000164638	ENSMUSG00000050822
UniProt	Q7RTT9	Q8R139
RefSeq (mRNA)	NM_001040661; NM_001300847; NM_153247	NM_146257
RefSeq (protein)	NP_001035751; NP_001287776; NP_694979	NP_666369
Location (UCSC)	Chr 7: 5.27 – 5.31 Mb	Chr 5: 142.68 – 142.71 Mb
PubMed search
- Wikidata
View/Edit Human	View/Edit Mouse

The plasma membrane monoamine transporter (PMAT) is a low-affinity monoamine transporter protein which in humans is encoded by the SLC29A4 gene. It is known alternatively as the human equilibrative nucleoside transporter-4 (hENT4). It was discovered in 2004 and has been identified as a potential alternate target for treating various conditions.

== Structure and function ==
The plasma membrane monoamine transporter is an integral membrane protein that transports the monoamine neurotransmitters (serotonin, dopamine, norepinephrine) as well as adenosine, from synaptic spaces into presynaptic neurons or neighboring glial cells. It is abundantly expressed in the human brain, heart tissue, and skeletal muscle, as well as in the kidneys, liver, and small intestine. It is relatively insensitive to the high affinity inhibitors (such as SSRIs) of the SLC6A monoamine transporters (SERT, DAT, NET), as well being only weakly sensitive to the adenosine transport inhibitor, dipyridamole.

PMAT is especially prevalent in dendrites with dense monoaminergic input, and has a significant impact on synaptic clearance of monoamines, especially under non-homeostatic conditions. PMAT transport is electrogenic, utilizing the naturally negative interior of the cells to attract the cationic monoamines, thereby increasing its V_{max} (without changing affinity) with increasingly negative membrane potentials.

PMAT preferentially transports 5-HT and DA, with a transport efficiency comparable to SERT and DAT, but a with a lower K_{m}. PMAT and similar transporters like OCT3 are commonly referred to as uptake_{2} transporters. Uptake_{2} transport refers to the transport of biogenic amines through low affinity, high-capacity transporters. At low a pH, (5.5-6.5 range, as occurs under ischemic conditions) its transport efficiency increases for all substrates, whereas at high pH (>8) transport is blocked. Unlike other members of the ENT family, it is impermeable to most nucleosides, with the exception of the inhibitory neurotransmitter and ribonucleoside adenosine, which it is permeable to in a highly pH-dependent manner. In addition to transporting neurotransmitters at synapses, PMAT plays a key role in neurotoxin and drug removal from the cerebrospinal fluid. It is also likely to play a key role in histamine clearance from synapses, specifically through astrocytes.

PMAT's proposed structure.

PMAT has 530 amino acid residues with a predicted molecular weight of 58kD, 11 transmembrane segments, an extracellular C-terminus, and an intracellular N-terminus. It has several phosphorylation sites and a potential glycosylation site, and its first 6 transmembrane domains are suspected to be important for substrate recognition. It is not homologous to other known monoamine transporters, such as the high-affinity SERT, DAT, and NET, or the low-affinity SLC22A OCT family. It was initially identified by a search of the draft human genome database through its sequence homology to ENTs (equilibrative nucleoside transporters).

== Clinical significance ==
Common SSRIs have been shown to inhibit PMAT uptake but at far greater concentrations than SERT. Residual uptake due to incomplete inhibition of PMAT may contribute to SSRI treatment resistance. Mice models with specific constitutive genetic deficiencies in PMAT have demonstrated behavioral changes relative to WT, including upon anti-depressant administration. PMAT was demonstrated to be differentially expressed in juvenile or adult mice. This differential expression coincided with decreased SSRI efficacy, and an anti-depressant-like effect of the PMAT inhibitor Decynium-22, suggesting a tentative mechanism for treatment-resistant depression in human adolescents and children.

Parkinson's disease states may be affected by PMAT activity at the synapse, due to its higher affinity for dopamine. In seeking to treat Parkinson's through increasing synaptic dopamine concentrations, it is possible that PMAT along with standard DAT inhibition could lead to better treatment outcomes with more complete blockage of uptake.

PMAT is expressed within the apical membranes of enterocytes in the small intestine. Gene variants affecting the expression of PMAT have been demonstrated to increase the occurrence of GI disturbance side effects with metformin administration, the most common type II diabetes medication.

== Inhibitors ==
No highly selective PMAT inhibitors are yet available, but a number of existing compounds have been found to act as weak inhibitors of this transporter, with the exception of decynium-22, which is more potent. These compounds include:

- Luteolin
- Cimetidine
- Decynium-22
- Dipyridamole
- Quinidine
- Quinine
- Tryptamine
- Verapamil
- Fluoxetine
- Sertraline
- Citalopram
- Fluvoxamine
- Paroxetine

Lopinavir shows promising results as a newly discovered selective PMAT inhibitor that does not impact.

== Substrates ==
- Acetylcholine (poor)
- Adenosine (at low pH)
- Dopamine
- Epinephrine
- Histamine (poor)
- Metformin (poor, pH-dependent)
- MPP^{+}
- Norepinephrine
- Serotonin
- Ritonavir

== See also ==
- Extraneuronal monoamine transporter (EMT)
