= Decynium-22 =

Cationic derivative of quinoline

Names
- Preferred IUPAC name 1-Ethyl-2-[(E)-(1-ethylquinolin-2(1H)-ylidene)methyl]quinolin-1-ium iodide
- Other names: Decynium-22; Pseudocyanine iodide; Pseudoisocyanine iodide

Identifiers
CAS Number	977-96-8
3D model (JSmol)	Interactive image
ChemSpider	4588533
ECHA InfoCard	100.012.324
EC Number	213-556-6
PubChem CID	5484462
UNII	BRU7LG9LNL
CompTox Dashboard (EPA)	DTXSID90883627
- InChI: InChI=1S/C23H23N2.HI/c1-3-24-20(15-13-18-9-5-7-11-22(18)24)17-21-16-14-19-10-6-8-12-23(19)25(21)4-2;/h5-17H,3-4H2,1-2H3;1H/q+1;/p-1 Key: GMYRVMSXMHEDTL-UHFFFAOYSA-M; InChI=1/C23H23N2.HI/c1-3-24-20(15-13-18-9-5-7-11-22(18)24)17-21-16-14-19-10-6-8-12-23(19)25(21)4-2;/h5-17H,3-4H2,1-2H3;1H/q+1;/p-1 Key: GMYRVMSXMHEDTL-REWHXWOFAU
- SMILES: CCN1C(=CC2=[N+](C3=CC=CC=C3C=C2)CC)C=CC4=CC=CC=C41.[I-]

Properties
Chemical formula	C_{23}H_{23}IN_{2}
Molar mass	454.355 g·mol^{−1}
Appearance	Dark red powder
Melting point	273 °C (523 °F; 546 K)
Solubility	4.54 mg/ml in DMSO

Hazards
NFPA 704 (fire diamond)	1 1 0
- Except where otherwise noted, data are given for materials in their standard state (at 25 °C [77 °F], 100 kPa). Infobox references

Decynium-22 is a cationic derivative of quinoline, and a potent inhibitor of the plasma membrane monoamine transporter (PMAT), as well as all members of the organic cation transporter (OCT) family in both human and rat cells. However, it has little effect on high affinity monoamine transporters such as the dopamine transporter and norepinephrine transporter.

== Transporter inhibition ==
Decynium has been shown to have a very high affinity to organic cation transporters in a variety of species, including human, rat, and pig. Decynium-22 has been shown to block the uptake of the neurotoxin 1-methyl-4-phenylpyridinium (MPP) via the OCT3 transporter in rat astrocytes.

== Fluorescence ==
Decynium-22 emits a low fluorescence yield (around 0.001), and in its monomeric form is a weakly fluorescent. However, aggregated decynium-22 emits a strong superradiant emission with a maximum near 570–580 nm. 480 nm light falls near a short wavelength peak of the excitation spectrum of these aggregates. Decynium-22 fluorescence caused by aggregation can be observed in astrocytes.

== Schizophrenia and depression ==
Decynium-22 has recently been investigated for its role in increasing extracellular serotonin in the brain in neuropharmacology research. The transportation of the neurotransmitter serotonin is often disrupted in psychiatric disorders characterized by social impairment, such as schizophrenia and depression. Serotonin is primarily taken up by the 5-HT transporter (SERT), although it is also taken up by auxiliary transporters, known as "uptake 2", which include OCT and PMAT.

The most commonly prescribed antidepressant drugs are the selective serotonin reuptake inhibitors (SSRIs), which act by blocking the high affinity SERT. A proposed explanation for the limited efficacy of SSRIs is the presence of the low affinity transporters OCT and PMAT, which limit the ability of SSRIs to increase extracellular serotonin. Decynium-22 blocked serotonin uptake via these auxiliary transporters, and when used in conjunction with SSRIs, decynium-22 enhanced the effects of SSRIs to inhibit serotonin clearance. A similar effect was seen in SERT knock-out mice, which resulted in an improvement of social behavior. When OCT3 was knocked out in mice, however, decynium-22 was ineffectual, indicating that the anti-depressant effects of decynium-22 are dependent upon its blockage of the OCT3.
