= 2β-Propanoyl-3β-(4-tolyl)-tropane =

Chemical compound

Identifiers
- IUPAC name: 1-[(1R,2S,3S,5S)-8-methyl-3-(4-methylphenyl)-8-azabicyclo[3.2.1]octan-2-yl]propan-1-one
- CAS Number: 152783-29-4
- PubChem CID: 127862
- ChemSpider: 113404
- CompTox Dashboard (EPA): DTXSID60934599

Chemical and physical data
- Formula: C_{18}H_{25}NO
- Molar mass: 271.404 g·mol^{−1}
- 3D model (JSmol): Interactive image
- SMILES: CCC(=O)[C@@H]1[C@H]2CC[C@H](N2C)C[C@@H]1C3=CC=C(C=C3)C
- InChI: InChI=1S/C18H25NO/c1-4-17(20)18-15(13-7-5-12(2)6-8-13)11-14-9-10-16(18)19(14)3/h5-8,14-16,18H,4,9-11H2,1-3H3/t14-,15+,16+,18-/m0/s1; Key:PZEAJTAVRYLBTK-LHHMISFZSA-N

2β-Propanoyl-3β-(4-tolyl)tropane also known as WF-11 or 2-PTT is a cocaine analogue 20 times more potent than cocaine at binding to the dopamine transporter with increased selectivity for the norepinephrine transporters. It also shows marked increase in metabolic stability. In contrast to the findings of cocaine effects, WF-11 has been shown to produce a uniform downregulation of tyrosine hydroxylase protein and activity gene expression with a regimen of use.

== See also ==
- List of cocaine analogues
- RTI-32
