= Bactobolin =

Names
- IUPAC name (2S)-N-[(3S,4R,4aR,5R,6R)-3-(Dichloromethyl)-5,6,8-trihydroxy-3-methyl-1-oxo-4a,5,6,7-tetrahydro-4H-isochromen-4-yl]-2-aminopropanamide

Identifiers
CAS Number	72615-20-4
3D model (JSmol)	Interactive image
ChEBI	CHEBI:138579
ChEMBL	ChEMBL489472
ChemSpider	35035304
PubChem CID	54676871
UNII	EOF7S67HS2
CompTox Dashboard (EPA)	DTXSID20222944
- InChI: InChI=1S/C14H20Cl2N2O6/c1-4(17)11(22)18-10-8-7(5(19)3-6(20)9(8)21)12(23)24-14(10,2)13(15)16/h4,6,8-10,13,19-21H,3,17H2,1-2H3,(H,18,22)/t4-,6+,8-,9-,10+,14-/m0/s1 Key: RBCHRRIVFAIGFI-RGBMRXMBSA-N
- SMILES: C[C@@H](C(=O)N[C@@H]1[C@@H]2[C@H]([C@@H](CC(=C2C(=O)O[C@]1(C)C(Cl)Cl)O)O)O)N

Properties
Chemical formula	C_{14}H_{20}Cl_{2}N_{2}O_{6}
Molar mass	383.22 g·mol^{−1}
- Except where otherwise noted, data are given for materials in their standard state (at 25 °C [77 °F], 100 kPa). Infobox references

Bactobolin is a cytotoxic, polyketide-peptide and antitumor antibiotic with the molecular formula C_{14}H_{20}Cl_{2}N_{2}O_{6}. Bactobolin was discovered in 1979.
