= 4-Fluoropethidine =

Chemical compound

Clinical data
- Other names: 4-Fluoromeperidine, 4-Fluoropethidine
- ATC code: none

Identifiers
- IUPAC name: ethyl 4-(4-fluorophenyl)-1-methylpiperidine-4-carboxylate
- CAS Number: 258500-87-7
- PubChem CID: 11184669
- ChemSpider: 9359754
- UNII: 2PA8LN9987
- ChEMBL: ChEMBL112817
- CompTox Dashboard (EPA): DTXSID601018250

Chemical and physical data
- Formula: C_{15}H_{20}FNO_{2}
- Molar mass: 265.328 g·mol^{−1}
- 3D model (JSmol): Interactive image
- SMILES: FC1=CC=C(C2(CCN(C)CC2)C(OCC)=O)C=C1
- InChI: InChI=1S/C15H20FNO2/c1-3-19-14(18)15(8-10-17(2)11-9-15)12-4-6-13(16)7-5-12/h4-7H,3,8-11H2,1-2H3; Key:CHOQGLPFQOQESN-UHFFFAOYSA-N

4-Fluoropethidine is a drug that is a derivative of pethidine (meperidine), which combines pethidine's opioid analgesic effects with increased monoamine reuptake inhibition. It is around 50% less potent than pethidine as an opioid analgesic, but conversely is 50% more potent as a dopamine reuptake inhibitor, with other derivatives such as the 4-iodo and 3,4-dichloro analogues being even more potent dopamine reuptake inhibitors again. However, none of these compounds substitute for cocaine or produce stimulant effects in animals, suggesting that they still act primarily as opioid analgesic drugs in practice. Its action and degree of relation to pethidine means that it may be controlled in those countries which have laws about controlled-substance analogues; it is not itself listed in the Controlled Substances Act 1970.

== See also ==
- Hydroxypethidine (Bemidone)
- Nocaine
