= RTI-55 =

Chemical compound

Clinical data
- Other names: (–)-2β-Carbomethoxy-3β-(4-iodophenyl)tropane; β-CIT; iometopane; iometopane I 123 (USAN); iometopane ^{123}I (INN); iometopane I 125 (USAN); iometopane ^{125}I (INN)

Legal status
- Legal status: UK: Class A; US: Schedule II

Identifiers
- IUPAC name: Methyl (1R,2S,3S)-3-(4-iodophenyl)-8-methyl-8-azabicyclo[3.2.1]octane-2-carboxylate
- CAS Number: 135416-43-2
- PubChem CID: 108220
- UNII: 4H1Z7121WS
- CompTox Dashboard (EPA): DTXSID801126429

Chemical and physical data
- Formula: C_{16}H_{20}INO_{2}
- Molar mass: 385.245 g·mol^{−1}
- 3D model (JSmol): Interactive image
- SMILES: CN1[C@H]2CC[C@@H]1[C@H]([C@H](C2)C3=CC=C(C=C3)I)C(=O)OC

RTI(-4229)-55, also called RTI-55 or iometopane, is a phenyltropane-based psychostimulant used in scientific research and in some medical applications. This drug was first cited in 1991. RTI-55 is a non-selective dopamine reuptake inhibitor derived from methylecgonidine. However, more selective analogs are derived by conversion to "pyrrolidinoamido" RTI-229, for instance. Due to the large bulbous nature of the weakly electron withdrawing iodo halogen atom, RTI-55 is the most strongly serotonergic of the simple para-substituted troparil based analogs. In rodents RTI-55 actually caused death at a dosage of 100 mg/kg, whereas RTI-51 and RTI-31 did not. Another notable observation is the strong propensity of RTI-55 to cause locomotor activity enhancements, although in an earlier study, RTI-51 was actually even stronger than RTI-55 in shifting baseline LMA. This observation serves to highlight the disparities that can arise between studies.

RTI-55 is one of the most potent phenyltropane stimulants commercially available, which limits its use in humans, as it might have significant abuse potential if used outside a strictly controlled medical setting. However, it is definitely worthy of mentioning that increasing the size of the halogen atom attached to troparil serves to reduce the number of lever responses in a session when these analogs were compared in a study. Although RTI-55 wasn't specifically examined in this study the number of lever responses in a given session was of the order cocaine > WIN35428 > RTI-31 > RTI-51.

In contrast to RTI-31 which is predominantly dopaminergic, increasing the size of the covalently bonded halogen from a chlorine to an iodine markedly increases the affinity for the SERT, while retaining mostly all of its DAT blocking activity.

The radiopharmaceutical forms of RTI-55, in which the iodine atom is radioiodine so that the drug can be used in single-photon emission computed tomography, are called iometopane I 123 (USAN) or iometopane ^{123}I (INN) and iometopane I 125 (USAN) or iometopane ^{125}I (INN). The ^{123}I and ^{125}I isotopes are favored because they are very-high-energy γ-ray emitters.

Compared to the "WIN" compounds, extremely low K_{i} values are attainable.

== Uses ==
RTI-55 is mainly used in scientific research into the dopamine reuptake transporter. Various radiolabelled forms of RTI-55 (with different radioactive isotopes of iodine used depending on the application) are used in both humans and animals to map the distribution of dopamine transporters and serotonin transporters in the brain. The ^{123}I derivative is known as iometopane.

The main practical application for this drug in medicine is to assess the rate of dopamine neuron degradation in the brains of sufferers of Parkinson's disease, and some other conditions such as progressive supranuclear palsy.

== Chemistry ==
RTI-55 is made as follows:

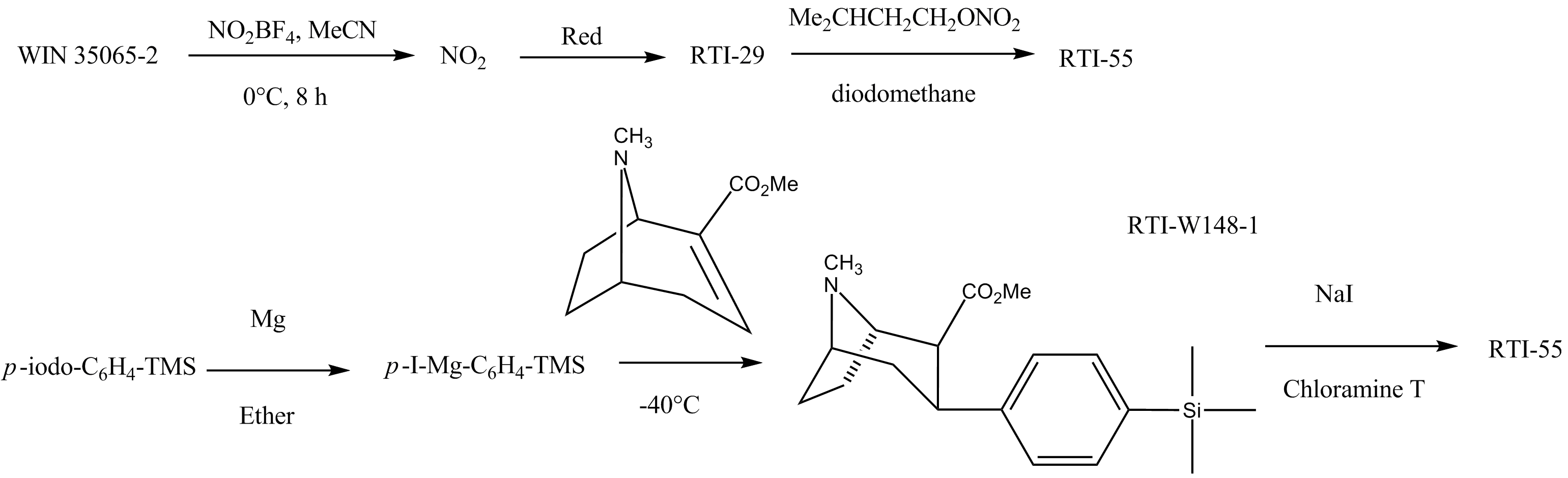

== See also ==
- RTI-121
- RTI-229
- RTI-352
- List of Phenyltropanes
