= RTI-121 =

Chemical compound

Legal status
- Legal status: In general: unscheduled

Identifiers
- IUPAC name: Propan-2-yl (1R,2S,3S)-3-(4-iodophenyl)-8-methyl-8-azabicyclo[3.2.1]octane-2-carboxylate
- CAS Number: 146145-21-3
- PubChem CID: 122190
- ChemSpider: 21106374
- CompTox Dashboard (EPA): DTXSID70912323

Chemical and physical data
- Formula: C_{18}H_{24}INO_{2}
- Molar mass: 413.299 g·mol^{−1}
- 3D model (JSmol): Interactive image
- SMILES: CN3[C@@H]1CCC3C[C@@H]([C@@H]1C(=O)OC(C)C)c2ccc(I)cc2
- InChI: InChI=1S/C18H24INO2/c1-11(2)22-18(21)17-15(12-4-6-13(19)7-5-12)10-14-8-9-16(17)20(14)3/h4-7,11,14-17H,8-10H2,1-3H3/t14?,15-,16-,17+/m1/s1; Key:ZAQLTGAFVMGUMB-IFFAKLHKSA-N

(–)-2β-Carboisopropoxy-3β-(4-iodophenyl)tropane (RTI-4229-121, IPCIT) is a stimulant drug used in scientific research, which was developed in the early 1990s. RTI-121 is a phenyltropane based, highly selective dopamine reuptake inhibitor and is derived from methylecgonidine. RTI-121 is a potent and long-lasting stimulant, producing stimulant effects for more than 10 hours after a single dose in mice which would limit its potential uses in humans, as it might have significant abuse potential if used outside a medical setting. However RTI-121 occupies the dopamine transporter more slowly than cocaine, and so might have lower abuse potential than cocaine itself.

== Uses ==
RTI-121 is mainly used in scientific research into the dopamine reuptake transporter. It is more selective for the dopamine transporter than other DAT radioligands such as β-CIT, and so has less nonspecific binding and produces "cleaner" images. Various radiolabelled forms of RTI-121 (with different radioactive isotopes of iodine used depending on the application) are used in both humans and animals to map the distribution of dopamine transporters in the brain.

== Legal status ==
RTI-121 not specified as controlled substance in any country as of 2007. Some jurisdictions such as the United States, Australia, and New Zealand, however, might however consider RTI-121 to be a controlled substance analogue of cocaine on the grounds of its related chemical structure.

== See also ==
- RTI-55
- List of cocaine analogues
- List of Phenyltropanes
