= Actinobolin =

Names
- IUPAC name (2S)-2-Amino-N-[(3R,4R,4aR,5R,6R)-5,6,8-trihydroxy-3-methyl-1-oxo-3,4,4a,5,6,7-hexahydroisochromen-4-yl]propanamide
- Other names (Propanamide, 2-amino-N-(3,4,4a,5,6,7-hexahydro-5,6, 8-trihydroxy-3-met hyl-1-oxo-1H-2-benzopyran-4-yl)-

Identifiers
CAS Number	24397-89-5
3D model (JSmol)	Interactive image
ChEMBL	ChEMBL1984390
ChemSpider	16735641
PubChem CID	54688606
UNII	999317A21F
CompTox Dashboard (EPA)	DTXSID001043243
- InChI: InChI=1S/C13H20N2O6/c1-4(14)12(19)15-10-5(2)21-13(20)8-6(16)3-7(17)11(18)9(8)10/h4-5,7,9-11,16-18H,3,14H2,1-2H3,(H,15,19)/t4-,5+,7+,9+,10-,11-/m0/s1 Key: PQVQBAAWCOTEBG-NSVWQLETSA-N
- SMILES: CC1C(C2C(C(CC(=C2C(=O)O1)O)O)O)NC(=O)C(C)N

Properties
Chemical formula	C_{13}H_{20}N_{2}O_{2}
Molar mass	236.315 g·mol^{−1}
- Except where otherwise noted, data are given for materials in their standard state (at 25 °C [77 °F], 100 kPa). Infobox references

Actinobolin is an antibiotic with the molecular formula C_{13}H_{20}N_{2}O_{6}. Actinobolin is produced by the bacterium Streptomyces griseoviridus var atrofaciens.
