= RTI-336 =

Chemical compound

Identifiers
- IUPAC name: 5-[(1S,3S,4S,5R)-3-(4-Chlorophenyl)-8-methyl-8-azabicyclo[3.2.1]octan-4-yl]-3-(4-methylphenyl)-1,2-oxazole
- CAS Number: 236754-02-2
- PubChem CID: 9800708
- ChemSpider: 7976471
- UNII: 8QGL4KK64H
- CompTox Dashboard (EPA): DTXSID90178343

Chemical and physical data
- Formula: C_{24}H_{25}ClN_{2}O
- Molar mass: 392.93 g·mol^{−1}
- 3D model (JSmol): Interactive image
- SMILES: CC1=CC=C(C=C1)C2=NOC(=C2)[C@@H]3[C@H]4CC[C@H](N4C)C[C@@H]3C5=CC=C(C=C5)
- InChI: InChI=1S/C24H25ClN2O/c1-15-3-5-17(6-4-15)21-14-23(28-26-21)24-20(16-7-9-18(25)10-8-16)13-19-11-12-22(24)27(19)2/h3-10,14,19-20,22,24H,11-13H2,1-2H3/t19-,20+,22+,24-/m0/s1; Key:AUXUFNHAVGIVDC-IKJKNFHUSA-N

RTI-336, also known as RTI-4229-336 or LS-193,309 is a potent and selective dopamine reuptake inhibitor that was initially developed by the Research Triangle Institute, now known as RTI International.

== Pharmacology ==
It is a phenyltropane derivative that binds to the dopamine transporter with approximately 20 times the affinity of cocaine. However, it produces relatively mild stimulant effects, with a slow onset and a long duration of action. (Although, other sources classify it as having among the faster onsets of action among phenyltropanes.)

Affinity of RIT-336 and analogs for the main monoamine transporters (DAT, NET, SERT):

RTI	X	R	[^{3}H]CFT	[^{3}H]Nisoxetine	[^{3}H]Paroxetine	N ÷ D	S ÷ D
Coc	—	—	89.1	3298 (1986)	1045 (45)	37.01	11.79
177	Cl	phenyl	1.28	504 (304)	2420 (220)	393.8	1891
176	Me	phenyl	1.58	398 (239)	5110 (465)	251.9	3234
354	Me	ethyl	1.62	299 (180)	6400 (582)	184.6	3951
336	Cl	p-tolyl	4.09	1714 (1033)	5741 (522)	419.1	1404
386	Me	p-anisyl	3.93	756 (450)	4027 (380)	192.4	1025

- [3H]CFT: [3H]CFT is a selective radioligand for the dopamine transporter (DAT)
- [3H]Nisoxetine: This is a radioligand for the norepinephrine transporter (NET)
- [3H]Paroxetine: This is a radioligand for the serotonin transporter (SERT)
- N ÷ D: ratio of norepinephrine transporter (NET) affinity to dopamine transporter (DAT) affinity
- S ÷ D: ratio of serotonin transporter (SERT) affinity to dopamine transporter (DAT) affinity

== Animal studies ==
These characteristics make it a potential candidate for the treatment of cocaine addiction, as a possible substitute drug, analogous to the use of methadone for treating heroin dependence. RTI-336 fully substitutes for cocaine in addicted monkeys and supports self-administration, and significantly reduces rates of cocaine use, especially when combined with SSRIs. Research is ongoing to determine whether it could be a viable substitute drug in human cocaine addicts.

RTI-336 and RTI-177 exhibited lower reinforcing strength than cocaine in nonhuman primates, indicating reduced abuse liability and supporting their viability as pharmacotherapies for addiction.

Chronic RTI-336 administration in rhesus monkeys altered motor activity and sleep patterns but did not cause adverse hormonal changes, suggesting a relatively safe profile for long-term therapeutic use.

== Clinical studies ==
A dosage of up to 20mg has been tolerated in healthy males.

== See also ==
- RTI-177
- List of cocaine analogues
