= SLC22A3 =

Protein-coding gene in the species Homo sapiens

Identifiers
- Aliases: SLC22A3, EMT, EMTH, OCT3, solute carrier family 22 member 3
- External IDs: OMIM: 604842; MGI: 1333817; GeneCards: SLC22A3

Gene location (Human)
Chr.	Chromosome 6 (human)
Band	6q25.3	Start	160,348,378 bp
Band	6q25.3	End	160,452,577 bp

Gene location (Mouse)
Chr.	Chromosome 17 (mouse)
Band	17 A1|17 8.52 cM	Start	12,637,847 bp
Band	17 A1|17 8.52 cM	End	12,726,591 bp
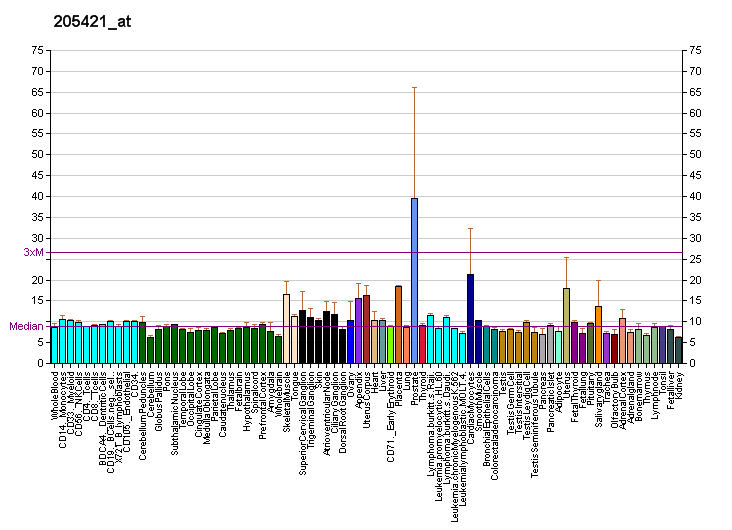
RNA expression pattern
Bgee	Human / Mouse (ortholog); Top expressed in: thoracic aorta; ascending aorta; Descending thoracic aorta; tibial nerve; right coronary artery; gastrocnemius muscle; left coronary artery; popliteal artery; tibial arteries; muscle of thigh / Top expressed in: gallbladder; utricle; white adipose tissue; brown adipose tissue; subcutaneous adipose tissue; tunica adventitia of aorta; submandibular gland; tunica media of zone of aorta; mammary gland; vestibular sensory epithelium; More reference expression data
BioGPS	More reference expression data
Gene ontology
Molecular function	protein binding; toxin transmembrane transporter activity; transporter activity; quaternary ammonium group transmembrane transporter activity; organic cation transmembrane transporter activity; organic anion transmembrane transporter activity; dopamine:sodium symporter activity
Cellular component	integral component of membrane; membrane; integral component of plasma membrane; plasma membrane
Biological process	dopamine transport; histamine transport; monoamine transport; histamine uptake; xenobiotic transmembrane transport; toxin transport; ion transport; quaternary ammonium group transport; organic cation transport; regulation of appetite; transmembrane transport; organic anion transport; dopamine uptake
Sources:Amigo / QuickGO
Orthologs
Databases	NCBI: entry; OMA: entry
Species	Human	Mouse
Entrez	6581	20519
Ensembl	ENSG00000146477	ENSMUSG00000023828
UniProt	O75751	Q9WTW5
RefSeq (mRNA)	NM_021977	NM_011395
RefSeq (protein)	NP_068812	NP_035525
Location (UCSC)	Chr 6: 160.35 – 160.45 Mb	Chr 17: 12.64 – 12.73 Mb
PubMed search
- Wikidata
View/Edit Human	View/Edit Mouse

Solute carrier family 22 member 3 (SLC22A3) also known as the organic cation transporter 3 (OCT3) or extraneuronal monoamine transporter (EMT) is a protein that in humans is encoded by the SLC22A3 gene.

Polyspecific organic cation transporters in the liver, kidney, intestine, and other organs are critical for elimination of many endogenous small organic cations as well as a wide array of drugs and environmental toxins. This gene is one of three similar cation transporter genes located in a cluster on chromosome 6. The encoded protein contains twelve putative transmembrane domains and is a plasma integral membrane protein.

== Distribution ==
OCT3 is widely distributed in brain tissue. It is not yet completely clear whether its location is primarily neuronal or glial. Areas of the brain in which it has been reported include: hippocampus, retrosplenial cortex, visual cortex, hypothalamus, amygdala, nucleus accumbens, thalamus, raphe nucleus, subiculum, superior and inferior colliculi, and islands of Calleja.

== Pharmacology ==
Organic cation transporter 3 is a polyspecific transporter whose transport is independent of sodium. Known substrates for transport include: histamine, serotonin, norepinephrine, dopamine and MPP^{+}. Capacity for transport and affinity for these substrates may vary between rat and human isoforms however.

Transport activity of OCT3 is inhibited by recreational and pharmaceutical drugs, including MDMA, phencyclidine (PCP), MK-801, amphetamine, methamphetamine and cocaine. Transport is also inhibited by the chemical decynium-22 and physiological concentrations of corticosterone and cortisol. K_{i} values for decynium-22 and corticosterone inhibition of OCT3 transport are respectively 10 and 100 times lower than K_{i} values of OCT1 and OCT2. This effect of glucocorticoids is believed to explain the phenomenon of stress-induced relapse in recovering addicts, where dopamine transport inhibition causes reactivation of hypersensitive dopamine pathways involved in drug-seeking behavior and incentive salience.

== See also ==
- Solute carrier family
