= Monoamine transporter =

Proteins that function as integral plasma-membrane transporters

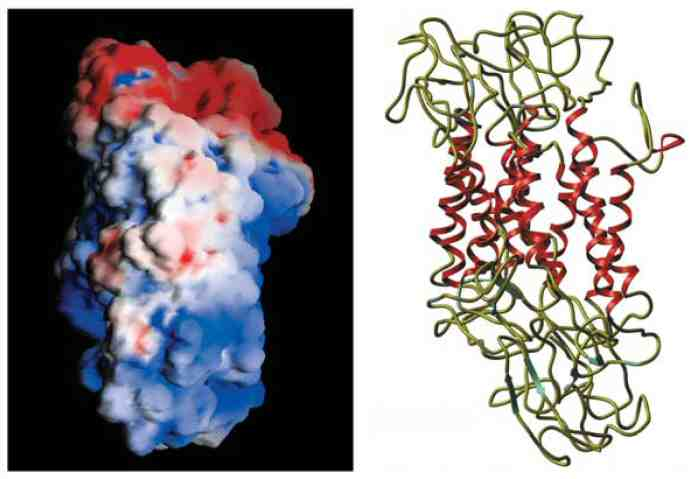
Dopamine Transporter (DAT-6)

Monoamine transporters (MATs) are proteins that function as integral plasma-membrane transporters to regulate concentrations of extracellular monoamine neurotransmitters. The three major classes are serotonin transporters (SERTs), dopamine transporters (DATs), and norepinephrine transporters (NETs) and are responsible for the reuptake of their associated amine neurotransmitters (serotonin, dopamine, and norepinephrine). MATs are located just outside the synaptic cleft (peri-synaptically), transporting monoamine transmitter overflow from the synaptic cleft back to the cytoplasm of the pre-synaptic neuron. MAT regulation generally occurs through protein phosphorylation and post-translational modification. Due to their significance in neuronal signaling, MATs are commonly associated with drugs used to treat mental disorders as well as recreational drugs. Compounds targeting MATs range from medications such as the wide variety of tricyclic antidepressants, selective serotonin reuptake inhibitors such as fluoxetine (Prozac) to stimulant medications such as methylphenidate (Ritalin) and amphetamine in its many forms (Adderall, Dexedrine) and derivatives methamphetamine (Desoxyn) and lisdexamfetamine (Vyvanse). Furthermore, drugs such as MDMA ("ecstasy", "molly") and natural alkaloids such as cocaine exert their effects in part by their interaction with MATs, by blocking the transporters from mopping up dopamine, serotonin, and other neurotransmitters from the synapse.

== Types ==
There are several different monoamine transporters located along the plasma membrane, each belonging to the family of Na ^{+}/Cl ^{−} -dependent substrate-specific neuronal membrane transporters.

- The dopamine transporter, DAT.
- The norepinephrine transporter, NET.
- The serotonin transporter, SERT.

== Function ==
=== Dopamine transporter (DAT) ===
DAT is responsible for the Na ^{+}/Cl ^{−} -dependent reuptake of extracellular dopamine (DA). DATs can be found in the central nervous system (CNS), where they are localized in the substantia nigra and ventral tegmental area (VTA). DATs are also found in the peripheral nervous system (PNS) where they are localized in the stomach, pancreas, as well as in lymphocytes. Various kinases have been linked to DAT regulation including PKA, PKC, PI-3K, ERK1, ERK2, Akt, CaMKII, CDK5, and MAPK.

=== Norepinephrine transporter (NET) ===
NET is responsible for the Na ^{+}/Cl ^{−} -dependent reuptake of extracellular norepinephrine (NE). NET can also reuptake extracellular DA. Within the CNS, NET is localized to the dendrites and axons found in both the hippocampus and cortex. Peripherally, NET can be found in sympathetic peripheral neurons, the adrenal medulla, the lung, the placenta, and the vas deferens. Regulation of NET has been linked to MAPKs, insulin, PKC, and angiotensin II.

=== Serotonin transporter (SERT) ===
SERT is responsible for the reuptake of extracellular serotonin (5-HT) in a Na ^{+}/Cl ^{−} -dependent process. In the CNS, SERT is found localized in the cerebral cortex, CA1 and CA3 regions of the hippocampus, as well as the median and dorsal raphe nuclei. In the PNS, SERT is localized to the intestinal tract, adrenal glands, placenta, lung, and platelets . Expression of SERT in platelets is used as a means to reacquire 5-HT from the extracellular environment and later used in platelet activation. Regulation of SERT has been linked to acute depletion of intracellular Ca Na ^{2+}, calmodulin inhibition, CaMKII, Src, p38 MAP kinase, PKC, and activation of NOS/cGMP.

== Structure and mechanism ==
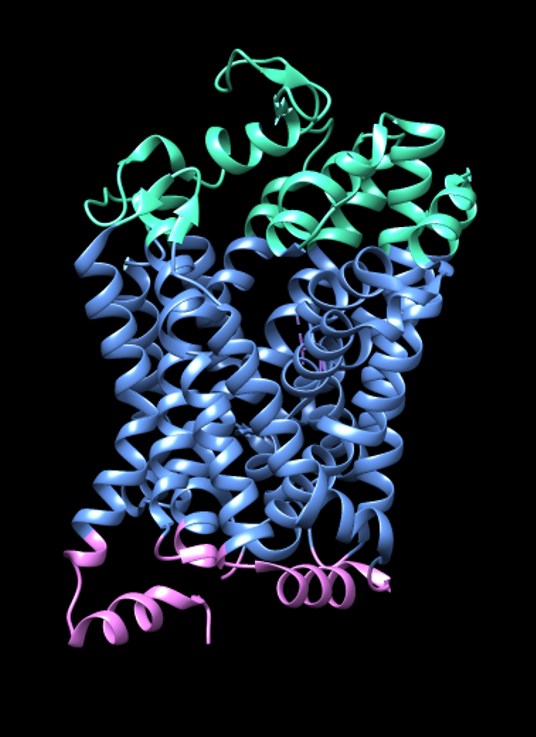
Dopamine transporter crystal structure. Extracellular, transmembrane, and intracellular regions shown in turquoise, blue, and pink, respectively. Based on structure from Penmansta et al. (Nature, 2013)

Monoamine transporters are members of the group of Na ^{+}/Cl ^{−} -dependent substrate-specific neuronal membrane transporters belonging to the SLC6 gene family. MATs are large integral membrane proteins composed of 12 transmembrane domains connected by intracellular and extracellular loops. The NH_{2} and COOH termini of the MAT proteins are located within the cytoplasm of presynaptic cells. All MATs contain sites for protein kinase phosphorylation by cAMP-dependent protein kinase, protein kinase C (PKC) and Ca^{2+}/calmodulin-dependent protein kinase.

MATs are responsible for the uptake of monoamines by the sequential binding and co-transport of Na ^{+} and Cl ^{−} ions. The ion concentration gradient generated by the plasma membrane Na^{+}/K^{+} ATPase provides the driving force for the transporter-mediated monoamine uptake. In the case of NET and SERT one Na^{+} and one Cl^{−} ion are transported into the cell with one NE or 5-HT respectively. In the case of DAT two Na^{+} and one Cl^{−} ion are transported along with one DA. When ionic gradients are altered (extracellular K^{+} increases or extracellular Na^{+} or Cl^{−} decreases) transporters can function in reverse resulting in a net efflux of substrates and ions out of a neuron.

To return to an outwardly facing conformation SERT requires the transport of intracellular K^{+}. There is no evidence that the other transporters have such a requirement.

Phosphorylation plays a key role in MAT function. When SERT is phosphorylated by the PKC-dependent pathway SERT internalization occurs. The internalization of SERT reduces 5-HT uptake. Similar phosphorylation events occur in DAT and NET, decreasing the cells transport capacity of MAs.

MAT	Gene	Size	Human Chromosome
DAT	hDAT	620 amino acids	5p15.3
SERT	hSERT	630 amino acids	17q11.2
NET	hNET	617 amino acids	16q12.2

== Associated disorders and treatments ==
Monoamine transporters are believed to be factors in several neurological conditions due to their role in reuptake of the monoamines dopamine, noradrenaline, and serotonin. These conditions include ADHD, depression, drug abuse, Parkinson's disease, schizophrenia, and Tourette's syndrome. Evidence supporting this belief includes that monoamine transporters, DAT, NET, and SERT, are important target sites for therapeutic drugs used in the treatment of mood disorders. Several drugs are used to treat disease symptoms by blocking monoamine transporters, which results in an increase in extracellular monoamines. In addition, the levels of monoamine transporters have been shown to be altered in many of these psychiatric and neurological conditions. Finally, polymorphic variations in monoamine transporter genes have been proposed to be associated with conditions such as ADHD and depression.

=== Attention deficit hyperactivity disorder ===
It has been observed that the hyperactivity, inattention, and impulsivity in ADHD is related to abnormal DAT function and regulation. Dopaminergic hypofunction in the frontal cortex and basal ganglia is a neurobiological feature observed in ADHD. Psychostimulants that potently inhibit DAT, such as methylphenidate and amphetamine, are efficacious in treating ADHD. Methylphenidate (Ritalin) inhibits both DAT and NET, which results in an increase in extracellular dopamine and norepinephrine that can readily bind postsynaptic cells. Methylphenidate targets DAT as a non-selective reuptake inhibitor. Methylphenidate is not an inhibitor of SERT.

=== Depression ===
It has been observed that the pathology of depression involves dysfunction of monoamine neurotransmitter circuits in the CNS, particularly of serotonin and norepinephrine. Selective serotonin reuptake inhibitors (SSRIs) are the most widely used antidepressant and include fluoxetine (Prozac), citalopram (Celexa), and fluvoxamine (Luvox). These drugs inhibit the reuptake of serotonin from the extracellular space into the synaptic terminal by selectively inhibiting SERT. It has been recently observed that serotonin, norepinephrine, and dopamine may all be involved in depression. Therefore, drugs such as venlafaxine and paroxetine are being used as effective antidepressants that selectively inhibit both SERT and NET. The tricyclic antidepressant desipramine is an antidepressant drug that is a relatively selective inhibitor of NE uptake. Studies of inhibition of NET correlate with antidepressant activity.

=== Schizophrenia ===
NET regulation is linked to altered dopamine transmission and schizophrenia-like behaviors. Nisoxetine is a NET inhibitor and reverses some schizophrenia-linked behavior. NET activities regulate NE as well as DA equilibrium. In addition, for normal DA clearance a functional DAT is necessary which suggests that DAT dysfunction may contribute to schizophrenia.

== Psychostimulants ==
DAT is also the target of several "DAT-blockers" including amphetamine and cocaine. These chemicals inhibit the action of DAT and, to a lesser extent, the other monoamine transporters, but their effects are mediated by separate mechanisms.

Monoamine transporters are established targets for many pharmacological agents that affect brain function, including the psychostimulants cocaine and amphetamine. Cocaine and amphetamine employ different mechanisms that both result in an increase in extracellular monoamines by decreasing reuptake. Psychostimulants affect primarily DAT, although there is some inhibition at SERT and NET. A large increase of synaptic dopamine results in an increased stimulation of target neurons believed to create the sensations of cocaine.

=== Cocaine ===
The stimulatory and euphoric effects of cocaine are created when cocaine inhibits the reuptake of dopamine by DAT, which results in an increase in extracellular dopamine. Dopamine can then more readily activate dopamine receptors, which overstimulates the cells. Cocaine is a non-selective, competitive inhibitor of monoamine transporters, sharing a similar mechanism with that of methylphenidate. Cocaine interacts with DAT, SERT, and NET, although the behavioral and reinforcing effects of cocaine depend on its inhibition of DAT and the increase in extracellular dopamine.

=== Amphetamine ===
In contrast, amphetamine enters the presynaptic neuron directly through the neuronal membrane or through monoamine transporters, competing for reuptake with neurotransmitters. Once inside, it binds to TAAR1 or enters synaptic vesicles through VMAT2. When amphetamine binds to TAAR1, it reduces post-synaptic receptor firing rate and triggers protein kinase A and protein kinase C signaling, resulting in transporter phosphorylation. Phosphorylated transporters then either operate in reverse or withdraw into the presynaptic neuron and cease transport. When amphetamine enters the synaptic vesicles through VMAT2, monoamines are released into the cytosol.

== Research history ==
The field of monoamine transporter research began roughly five decades ago with Julius Axelrod's research on NETs. Axelrod eventually received his Nobel Prize for this research, which led to the discovery of DATs and SERTs as well as consequences associated with antidepressant and psychostimulant interactions with MAT proteins. Since Axelrod's initial studies, understanding the pharmacological and functional properties of MAT proteins have been essential in the discovery of therapeutic treatment of many mental disorders. During the 1990s various cloning techniques using MATs have elucidated the genetic structure of these proteins. In 1991 Susan Amara and her colleagues determined the amino acid sequence of NET, discovering its relatively high coding similarities to that of the GABA transporter.

Current research is underway to understand how MATs function and are regulated by looking at newly discovered structural and functional domains of these proteins. Over the last decade, the availability of targeted disruption of monoamine transporter genes in animal models as well as in vivo imaging approaches have shown progress in studies associated with psychiatric and movement disorders. Ongoing research is attempting to clarify the extent to which kinase cascades, transporter interacting proteins, and phosphorylation contribute to MAT regulation.

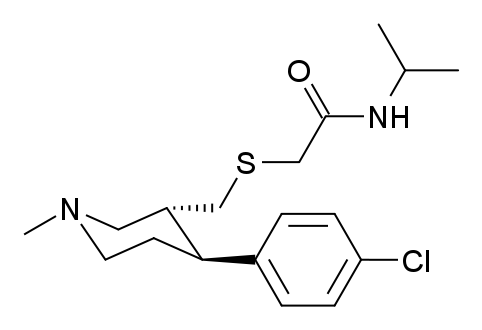
16e

Blough 2002

== Double and triple MAT agents (a.k.a. SNRIs and SNDRIs) ==
Below are examples of drugs that act directly by inhibiting two or more MATs simultaneously. Serotonin-norepinephrine re-uptake inhibitors (SNRIs) act by blocking both SERTs and NETs. Serotonin-norepinephrine-dopamine (SNDRIs) act by blocking DATs, NETs, and SERTs simultaneously. Most modern antidepressant drugs work on the principle of blocking re-uptake transporters. SSRI's such as Fluoxetine (Prozac) and SNRI's as with Venlafaxine are the main types of drugs given in first line depression and anxiety treatment.

- PRC200-SS is an example of an SNRI.
- JNJ-7925476 is an example of a TRI
- nocaine-modafinil hybrids such as 16e
- Blough (2002) showed that MATs exhibit a "remote phenyl binding domaine"

== See also ==
- Vesicular monoamine transporter (VMAT)
- Plasma membrane monoamine transporter (PMAT)
- Extraneuronal monoamine transporter (EMT)
