= N,O-Dimethyl-4-(2-naphthyl)piperidine-3-carboxylate =

Chemical compound

Identifiers
- IUPAC name: methyl (3S,4S)- 1-methyl- 4-(2-naphthyl)piperidine- 3-carboxylate
- CAS Number: 265112-64-9
- PubChem CID: 10684403
- CompTox Dashboard (EPA): DTXSID80443517

Chemical and physical data
- Formula: C_{18}H_{21}NO_{2}
- Molar mass: 283.371 g·mol^{−1}
- 3D model (JSmol): Interactive image
- SMILES: COC(=O)C1CN(C)CCC1c3ccc2ccccc2c3

N,O-Dimethyl-4β-(2-naphthyl)piperidine-3β-carboxylate (DMNPC) is a piperidine based stimulant drug which is synthesised from arecoline. It is similar to nocaine in chemical structure, and has two and a half times more activity than cocaine as a dopamine reuptake inhibitor. However it is also a potent serotonin reuptake inhibitor, with similar affinity to fluoxetine. DMNPC racemate has been sold online as a designer drug since late 2024.

DMNPC has four stereoisomers, each of which has different binding affinities, with the 3S,4S enantiomer having the highest overall activity. The 3R,4S enantiomer demonstrates the highest selectivity for 5-HTT.

Binding affinities (Ki)
Stereochemistry	5HT	DA	NE
3S,4S	7.6	21	34
3R,4S	42	947	241
3R,4R	192	87	27
3S,4R	12	271	38

In animal studies, DMNPC exhibits similar potency as fluoxetine, but with greater activity for DAT and NET. N-Demethylation of DMNPC has shown to produce a 3-fold increase in potency for 5-HTT.

== Synthesis ==
A racemic mixture of DMNPC can be synthesized from freebase arecoline in a grignard reaction with 2-naphthylmagnesium bromide. Further reactions and separation methods can be used to produce enantiomerically pure products.

== See also ==
- 1-Methyl-3-propyl-4-(p-chlorophenyl)piperidine
- Naphthylamphetamine
- Naphyrone
- List of cocaine analogues
