= RTI-150 =

Chemical compound

Identifiers
- IUPAC name: Cyclobutyl (1R,2S,3S,5S)-8-methyl-3-(4-methylphenyl)-8-azabicyclo[3.2.1]octane-2-carboxylate
- CAS Number: 752958-88-6
- PubChem CID: 9972881
- ChemSpider: 8148473
- UNII: Y8KCN7S6KE
- ChEMBL: ChEMBL1812740
- CompTox Dashboard (EPA): DTXSID601027572

Chemical and physical data
- Formula: C_{20}H_{27}NO_{2}
- Molar mass: 313.441 g·mol^{−1}
- 3D model (JSmol): Interactive image
- SMILES: CC1=CC=C(C=C1)[C@H]2C[C@@H]3CC[C@H]([C@H]2C(=O)OC4CCC4)N3C
- InChI: InChI=1S/C20H27NO2/c1-13-6-8-14(9-7-13)17-12-15-10-11-18(21(15)2)19(17)20(22)23-16-4-3-5-16/h6-9,15-19H,3-5,10-12H2,1-2H3/t15-,17+,18+,19-/m0/s1; Key:LBLVIDUIWXYVNG-AITUJVMLSA-N

RTI(-4229)-150, ((−)-2β-Carbocyclobutoxy-3β-(4-methylphenyl)tropane) is a phenyltropane derivative which acts as a potent dopamine reuptake inhibitor and stimulant drug. It is around 5x more potent than cocaine, but is more selective for the dopamine transporter relative to the other monoamine transporters. RTI-150 has a fast onset of effects and short duration of action, and its abuse potential in animal studies is similar to that of cocaine itself; its main application in scientific research has been in studies investigating the influence of pharmacokinetics on the abuse potential of stimulant drugs, with the rapid entry of RTI-150 into the brain thought to be a key factor in producing its high propensity for development of dependence in animals. RTI-150 is not explicitly illegal anywhere in the world, but its similar structure and pharmacological activity to cocaine makes it possible that it would be considered a controlled substance analogue in countries such as the US, Canada, Australia and New Zealand which have controlled substance analogue legislation.

== See also ==
- List of cocaine analogues
