= WIN-35428 =

Chemical compound

Clinical data
- Other names: CFT, WIN 35,428

Legal status
- Legal status: US: Schedule II

Identifiers
- IUPAC name: Methyl (1R,2S,3S,5S)-3-(4-fluorophenyl)-8-methyl-8-azabicyclo[3.2.1]octane-2-carboxylate
- CAS Number: 50370-56-4 77210-32-3
- PubChem CID: 105056
- IUPHAR/BPS: 4606
- ChemSpider: 94788
- UNII: 8ZT6KJ947T
- ChEMBL: ChEMBL541252
- CompTox Dashboard (EPA): DTXSID30198424
- ECHA InfoCard: 100.164.866

Chemical and physical data
- Formula: C_{16}H_{20}FNO_{2}
- Molar mass: 277.339 g·mol^{−1}
- 3D model (JSmol): Interactive image
- Specific rotation: -62.5°
- Melting point: 202 to 204 °C (396 to 399 °F)
- SMILES: CN1[C@H]2CC[C@@H]1[C@H]([C@H](C2)C3=CC=C(C=C3)F)C(=O)OC
- InChI: InChI=1S/C16H20FNO2/c1-18-12-7-8-14(18)15(16(19)20-2)13(9-12)10-3-5-11(17)6-4-10/h3-6,12-15H,7-9H2,1-2H3/t12-,13+,14+,15-/m0/s1; Key:QUSLQENMLDRCTO-YJNKXOJESA-N

WIN 35,428 (β-CFT, (–)-2-β-Carbomethoxy-3-β-(4-fluorophenyl)tropane) is a stimulant drug used in scientific research. CFT is a phenyltropane based dopamine reuptake inhibitor and is structurally derived from cocaine. It is around 3-10x more potent than cocaine and lasts around 7 times longer based on animal studies. While the naphthalenedisulfonate salt is the most commonly used form in scientific research due to its high solubility in water, the free base and hydrochloride salts are known compounds and can also be produced. The tartrate is another salt form that is reported.

== Uses ==
CFT was first reported by Clarke and co-workers in 1973. This drug is known to function as a "positive reinforcer" (although it is less likely to be self-administered by rhesus monkeys than cocaine). Tritiated CFT is frequently used to map binding of novel ligands to the DAT, although the drug also has some SERT affinity.

Radiolabelled forms of CFT have been used in humans and animals to map the distribution of dopamine transporters in the brain. CFT was found to be particularly useful for this application as a normal fluorine atom can be substituted with the radioactive isotope ^{18}F which is widely used in Positron emission tomography. Another radioisotope-substituted analog [11C]WIN 35,428 (where the carbon atom of either the N-methyl group, or the methyl from the 2-carbomethoxy group of CFT, has been replaced with ^{11}C) is now more commonly used for this application, as it is quicker and easier in practice to make radiolabelled CFT by methylating nor-CFT or 2-desmethyl-CFT than by reacting methylecgonidine with parafluorophenylmagnesium bromide, and also avoids the requirement for a licence to work with the restricted precursor ecgonine.

CFT is about as addictive as cocaine in animal studies, but is taken less often due to its longer duration of action. Potentially this could make it a suitable drug to be used as a substitute for cocaine, in a similar manner to how methadone is used as a substitute for opiates in treating addiction.

== Street drug ==
In August 2010, some media sources claimed that the designer drug Ivory Wave contained WIN 35428. However, these reports at the time were poorly researched and sensationalized: the use of the pseudonym 'meow meow' (for Mephedrone) appears to have originated in the UK media. Samples of Ivory Wave were later found to contain MDPV, and the careless and exploitative nature of reporting regarding new psychoactive compounds in this fashion not only served to raise awareness that such compounds were for sale and available to the public-at-large, but posed a significant risk to public health in its own right due to misleading or incorrect information. The first definitive identification of genuine WIN 35428 as a designer drug was some years later in 2018.

== Legal status ==
CFT is not specifically scheduled in the United States, though it meets the statutory definition of an ecgonine derivative. Consequently, it is a Schedule II drug.

== Toxicity ==
Administering 100 mg/kg of CFT to rats only resulted in convulsions being reported, whereas CIT had the ability to cause death at this dose.

== See also ==
- WIN 35,065-2
- List of phenyltropanes
- List of cocaine analogues
