= Nisoxetine =

Chemical compound

Clinical data
- Other names: LY-94939, (±)-γ-(2-Methoxyphenoxy)-N-methyl-benzenepropanamine hydrochloride
- ATC code: None

Legal status
- Legal status: Never marketed

Identifiers
- IUPAC name: (RS)-3-(2-methoxyphenoxy)-N-methyl-3-phenylpropan-1-amine
- CAS Number: 53179-07-0
- PubChem CID: 4500
- IUPHAR/BPS: 4637
- ChemSpider: 4344
- UNII: 17NV064B2D
- KEGG: D05173
- ChEBI: CHEBI:73410
- ChEMBL: ChEMBL295467
- CompTox Dashboard (EPA): DTXSID0045175

Chemical and physical data
- Formula: C_{17}H_{21}NO_{2}
- Molar mass: 271.360 g·mol^{−1}
- 3D model (JSmol): Interactive image
- Chirality: Racemic mixture
- SMILES: CNCCC(C1=CC=CC=C1)OC2=CC=CC=C2OC
- InChI: InChI=1S/C17H21NO2/c1-18-13-12-15(14-8-4-3-5-9-14)20-17-11-7-6-10-16(17)19-2/h3-11,15,18H,12-13H2,1-2H3; Key:ITJNARMNRKSWTA-UHFFFAOYSA-N

Nisoxetine (developmental code name LY-94939), originally synthesized in the Lilly research laboratories during the early 1970s, is a potent and selective inhibitor for the reuptake of norepinephrine (noradrenaline) into synapses. It currently has no clinical applications in humans, although it was originally researched as an antidepressant. Nisoxetine is now widely used in scientific research as a standard selective norepinephrine reuptake inhibitor. It has been used to research obesity and energy balance, and exerts some local analgesia effects.

Researchers have attempted to use a carbon-labeled form of nisoxetine for positron emission tomography (PET) imaging of the norepinephrine transporter (NET), with little success. However, it seems that tritium-labeled nisoxetine (^{3}H-nisoxetine, ^{3}H-NIS) is a useful radioligand for labeling norepinephrine uptake sites in vitro, which nisoxetine and other antagonists for NET are able to inhibit.

== History ==
In treating depression, it was theorized that substances that could enhance norepinephrine transmission, such as tricyclic antidepressants (TCA), could diminish the symptoms of clinical depression. The origins of nisoxetine can be found within the discovery of fluoxetine (Prozac, by Eli Lilly). In the 1970s, Bryan B. Molloy (a medicinal chemist) and Robert Rathbun (a pharmacologist) began a collaboration to search for potential antidepressant agents that would still retain the therapeutic activity of TCAs without undesirable cardiotoxicity and anticholinergic properties. The antihistamine drug diphenhydramine was found to inhibit monoamine uptake in addition to antagonizing histamine receptors, and this inhibition of monoamine uptake became a potential application for treating depression. As a result, Molloy, along with colleagues Schmiegal and Hauser, synthesized members of the phenoxyphenylpropylamine (PPA) group as analogues of diphenhydramine.

Richard Kattau in the Rathbun laboratory tested the newly created drugs within the series of PPAs for their ability to reverse apomorphine-induced hypothermia in mice (PIHM), a test in which the TCAs were active antagonists. Kattau found that one member of the series, LY94939 (nisoxetine), was as potent and effective as the TCAs in the reversal of PIHM. Nisoxetine was found to be as potent as desipramine in inhibiting norepinephrine uptake in brain synaptosomes while not acting as a potent inhibitor of serotonin (5-HT) or dopamine uptake.

Preclinical studies in humans were also performed in 1976 to evaluate the safety and possible mechanism of nisoxetine. At doses capable of blocking the uptake of norepinephrine and tyramine at nerve terminals, nisoxetine did not produce any substantial side effects. Abnormal electrocardiogram effects were also not observed, indicating it to be a relatively safe compound.

Later, however, researchers considered ways in which subtle chemical differences in the PPA series could selectively inhibit 5-HT uptake, which eventually led to the synthesis of nisoxetine's 4-trifluoremethyl analogue, fluoxetine. Nisoxetine was never marketed as a drug due to a greater interest in pursuing the development of fluoxetine, a selective serotonin reuptake inhibitor (SSRI).

== Research ==
=== Obesity ===
Numerous evidence suggests that by altering catecholaminergic signaling (cell communication via norepinephrine and dopamine), food intake and body weight will be affected via classic hypothalamic systems that are involved in the regulation of energy balance. Antidepressants, such as the atypical antidepressant bupropion, can also cause weight loss due to their ability to increase extracellular dopamine and norepinephrine by inhibiting their uptake. Other research has focused on the interaction of serotonin and norepinephrine, leading to serotonin–norepinephrine reuptake inhibitors (SNRIs) as anti-obesity drugs.

The primary forebrain sensor of peripheral cues that relays information about the availability of energy and storage is the arcuate nucleus of the hypothalamus (ARH), and it contains two types of cells that have opposing effects on energy balance. These two types of cells are neuropeptide Y (NPY)-expressing cells, which cause hyperphagia and energy conservation, and cells that pro-opiomelanocortin (POMC), which are related to hypophagia and increased energy expenditure. NPY and norepinephrine are both localized in select neurons in the brain and periphery. A norepinephrine reuptake inhibitor, such as nisoxetine, could potentially cause anorexia by decreasing activity of cells that express NPY and norepinephrine.

In lean and obese mice, selective and combined norepinephrine and dopamine reuptake inhibition reduces food intake and body weight. Yet selective reuptake inhibitors of norepinephrine and dopamine (nisoxetine and a substance codenamed GBR12783, respectively) independently have no effect on food intake in mice. However, when given in combination, there is profound inhibition of food intake. This demonstrates a synergistic interaction between dopamine and norepinephrine in controlling ingestive behavior, similar to the action of SNRIs. The fact that nisoxetine alone does not affect food intake suggests that norepinephrine alone is insufficient to affect feeding or that the blocked reuptake of norepinephrine by nisoxetine is acting in the wrong place. Unlike nisoxetine, its sulfur analog thionisoxetine reduces food consumption in rodents and is a more promising treatment for obesity and eating disorders.

=== Analgesia effects ===
An essential activity of local anesthetics is the blockade of sodium channels. In this way, local anesthetics are able to produce infiltrative cutaneous analgesia, peripheral neural blockades, as well as spinal/epidural anesthesia. Due to nisoxetine's sodium channel blocking effect, it is also possible that it may also have a local anesthetic effect. Nisoxetine is able to suppress the nicotine-evoked increase of hippocampal norepinephrine in a dose-dependent nature through effects on the functioning of the nicotinic acetylcholine receptors. It is also able to inhibit tetrodotoxin-facilitated sensitive inward sodium currents in rat superior cervical ganglia.

Nisoxetine elicits local (cutaneous) but not systemic analgesia. Compared to lidocaine, a common anesthetic, nisoxetine is more potent (by four folds) and exhibits longer drug action towards producing cutaneous anesthesia. NMDA receptors are not involved in this local anesthetic effect. However, it is unclear whether nisoxetine may cause toxicity to the neuronal or subcutaneous tissues, which still needs to be investigated in the future.

=== ^{3}H-nisoxetine ===
Due to shortcomings of the previously available radioligands for the norepinephrine uptake site, researchers needed to find a better ligand for measuring norepinephrine reuptake sites. These shortcomings also meant that the norepinephrine uptake sites in the brain were less studied than the 5-HT uptake sites. Previous radioligands for the norepinephrine uptake sites, ^{3}H-desipramine (^{3}H-DMI) and ^{3}H-mazindol (^{3}H-MA), did not have specific and selective binding properties for norepinephrine sites.

^{3}H-nisoxetine (^{3}H-NIS), on the other hand, is a potent and selective inhibitor for the uptake of norepinephrine and is now used as a selective marker of the norepinephrine transporter. Most studies using ^{3}H-NIS are conducted in the rat model, and not many have been performed in humans. ^{3}H-NIS can be used to map anatomical sites associated with norepinephrine uptake through the technique of quantitative autoradiography (QAR), where the pattern of ^{3}H-NIS binding is consistent with the pattern of norepinephrine activation. Lesion studies also confirm ^{3}H-NIS's relation to presynaptic norepinephrine terminals.

^{3}H-NIS binds with high affinity (K_{d} = 0.7 nM) and selectivity to a homogenous population of sites that are associated with norepinephrine uptake in the rat brain. Specific ^{3}H-NIS binding increases as sodium concentration is raised, and binding of ^{3}H-NIS is barely detectable in the absence of sodium. Binding of ^{3}H-NIS is sodium-dependent because sodium ions are necessary for the neuronal uptake of norepinephrine. This binding is also heat-sensitive, where heating rat cerebral cortical membranes reduces the amount of specific binding. Nisoxetine (K_{i} = 0.7 + 0.02 nM), as well as other compounds that have a high affinity for norepinephrine uptake sites (DMI, MAZ, maprotiline), act as potent inhibitors of ^{3}H-NIS binding to rat cortical membranes.

In humans, ^{3}H-NIS is used to measure uptake sites in the locus coeruleus (LC). The LC, a source of norepinephrine axons, has been of focus in research due to reports of cell loss in the area that occurs with aging in humans. Decreased binding of ^{3}H-NIS reflects the loss of LC cells.

=== NET imaging using PET ===
Researchers are attempting to image the norepinephrine transporter (NET) system using positron emission tomography (PET). Possible ligands to be used for this methodology must possess high affinity and selectivity, high brain penetration, appropriate lipophilicity, reasonable stability in plasma, as well as high plasma free fraction. ^{11}C-labeled nisoxetine, synthesized by Haka and Kilbourn, was one possible candidate that was investigated for being used as a potential PET tracer. However, in vivo, ^{11}C-labeled nisoxetine exhibits nonspecific binding, therefore limiting its effectiveness as a possible ligand for PET.

== Pharmacological properties ==
Nisoxetine is a potent and selective inhibitor of norepinephrine uptake, where it is about 1000-fold more potent in blocking norepinephrine uptake than that of serotonin. It is 400-fold more potent in blocking the uptake of norepinephrine than that of dopamine. The R-isomer of nisoxetine has 20 times greater affinity than its S-isomer for NET. Nisoxetine has little or no affinity for neurotransmitter receptors. The NET K_{i} for nisoxetine is generally agreed to be 0.8 nM.

In a preclinical study where nisoxetine was administered to volunteers, the average plasma concentration after a single dose was found to be 0.028 microgram/ml, and after the fifteenth dose was 0.049 microgram/ml. The binding of nisoxetine is saturable in human placental NET, with specific binding values being 13.8 + 0.4 nM for K_{d} and 5.1 + 0.1 pmol/mg of protein for B_{max} Sodium and chloride enhances nisoxetine binding by increasing the affinity of the binding site for its ligand, where K_{d} values increase as the concentration of chloride decrease. B_{max} is not affected.

Activity of ^{3}H-NIS on cerebral cortical homogenates in mice show a K_{d} of 0.80 + 0.11 nM and a B_{max} of + 12 fmol/mg protein. Density of binding is generally associated with brain regions that exhibit norepinephrine levels, where the highest specific ^{3}H-NIS binding is in the brainstem (LC) and the thalamus. Specific ^{3}H-NIS binding is dependent on sodium cations, where specific and total binding is raised as the concentration of sodium is increased (Tejani-Butt et al., 1990). This binding occurs with high affinity towards a single class of sites that have similar pharmacological characteristics of the norepinephrine uptake site.

Nisoxetine and other inhibitors of norepinephrine uptake sites are able to inhibit the binding of ^{3}H-NIS. When rats are intravenously injected with nisoxetine and the binding of ^{3}H-NIS is measured, the K_{i} of nisoxetine is reported to be 0.8 + 0.1 nM for concentrations of up to 1 μM.

== Adverse effects ==
Norepinephrine, along with dopamine and/or other serotonin reuptake inhibitors, are often prescribed in the treatment of mood disorders and are generally well tolerated.

Preclinical studies in humans using nisoxetine were conducted in the 1970s, and side effects of the drug were examined. Doses ranging from 1 mg to 50 mg do not result in any changes in base line values in haematologic tests, routine blood chemistries, or coagulation parameters. Larger doses produce some side effects, but no electrocardiographic changes are observed in any doses. Injections with doses of tyramine in humans while receiving nisoxetine results in a decreased responsiveness to tyramine with increased duration of administered nisoxetine. Another effect of nisoxetine administration is that subjects require much smaller doses of norepinephrine to produce the same blood pressure responses as those who receive a placebo. In other words, subjects exhibit an increased sensitivity to norepinephrine after nisoxetine administration. Preclinical test conclude that the drug, in tested doses, appears to be safe for use in humans.

== Chemical properties ==
Nisoxetine is a racemic compound with two isomers.

Tricyclic (three-ring) structures can be found in many different drugs, and for medicinal chemists allows restrictions for the conformational mobility of two phenyl rings attached to a common carbon or hetero (non-carbon) atom. Small molecular changes, such as substituents or ring flexibility can cause changes in the pharmacological and physiochemical properties of a drug. The mechanism of action for the phenoxyphenylpropyamines can be explained by the critical role of the type and position of the ring substitution. The unsubstituted molecule is a weak SSRI. A compound highly potent and selective for blocking norepinephrine reuptake, a SNRI, results from 2-substitutions into the phenoxy ring.

== See also ==
- Reboxetine
- Atomoxetine
- Fluoxetine
