= Troparil =

Chemical compound

Clinical data
- ATC code: none

Legal status
- Legal status: UK: Under Psychoactive Substances Act; US: Schedule II

Identifiers
- IUPAC name: Methyl (1R,2S,3S,5S)-8-methyl-3-phenyl-8-azabicyclo[3.2.1]octane-2-carboxylate
- CAS Number: 74163-84-1
- PubChem CID: 170832
- ChemSpider: 149355
- UNII: 11M96D7J17
- ChEMBL: ChEMBL298684
- CompTox Dashboard (EPA): DTXSID30964641

Chemical and physical data
- Formula: C_{16}H_{21}NO_{2}
- Molar mass: 259.349 g·mol^{−1}
- 3D model (JSmol): Interactive image
- Melting point: 190 to 191 °C (374 to 376 °F)
- SMILES: CN1[C@H]2CC[C@@H]1[C@H]([C@H](C2)C3=CC=CC=C3)C(=O)OC
- InChI: InChI=1S/C16H21NO2/c1-17-12-8-9-14(17)15(16(18)19-2)13(10-12)11-6-4-3-5-7-11/h3-7,12-15H,8-10H2,1-2H3/t12-,13+,14+,15-/m0/s1; Key:OMBOXYLBBHNWHL-YJNKXOJESA-N

Troparil (also known as (–)-2β-Carbomethoxy-3β-phenyltropane, WIN 35,065-2, or β-CPT) is a stimulant drug used in scientific research. Troparil is a phenyltropane-based dopamine reuptake inhibitor (DRI) that is derived from methylecgonidine. Troparil is a few times more potent than cocaine as a dopamine reuptake inhibitor, but is less potent as a serotonin reuptake inhibitor, and has a duration spanning a few times longer, since the phenyl ring is directly connected to the tropane ring through a non-hydrolyzable carbon-carbon bond. The lack of an ester linkage removes the local anesthetic action from the drug, so troparil is a pure stimulant. This change in activity also makes troparil slightly less cardiotoxic than cocaine. The most commonly used form of troparil is the tartrate salt, but the hydrochloride and naphthalenedisulfonate salts are also available, as well as the free base.

== Background ==
The first known published synthesis of troparil and the related compound WIN 35428 is by Clarke and co-workers during the 1970s. Apparently, it was their intention to separate the stimulant actions of cocaine from its toxicity and dependence liability. Troparil is the only regular phenyltropane having a NET affinity that exceeds the DAT affinity.

== Application ==
Phenyltropanes are likely to have less abuse and dependency compared with cocaine.

Troparil is used in scientific research into the dopamine reuptake transporter. ^{3}H-radiolabelled forms of troparil have been used in humans and animals to map the distribution of dopamine transporters in the brain. It is also used for animal research into stimulant drugs as an alternative to cocaine which produces similar effects, but avoids the stringent licensing requirements for the use of cocaine itself.

Troparil has similar effects to cocaine in animal studies, but recreational use of this compound to date has proven extremely rare. Despite being easily made by the reaction of methylecgonidine with phenylmagnesium bromide, the relative scarcity of methylecgonidine and the demanding reaction conditions required for the synthesis put production of this compound beyond the capacity of most illicit drug manufacturers, and legitimate supplies of troparil are available only in very small quantities for a very high price. Troparil was first reported as a designer drug in 2020, identified in samples from Poland.

== Legality ==
The legal status of troparil is unclear, but it may be considered a controlled substance analog of cocaine in the United States on the grounds of its related chemical structure. The legal status of troparil and many other cocaine analogs in Canada, is dependent on if ecgonine, coca, or cocaine were derivatives of the compound, according to the wording on the entry of coca in Schedule 1 of the Controlled Drugs and Substances Act.

== See also ==
- List of phenyltropanes
- List of cocaine analogues
- Amfonelic acid
