= Phenyltropane =

Class of chemical compounds

Troparil: A structural analog of cocaine with omitted -COO- linkage – a parent compound of many MAT ligands (here in an unfavourable conformation of the O-Me. The methyl has to be at the other O, and trans).

Phenyltropanes (PTs) were originally developed to reduce cocaine addiction and dependency. In general these compounds act as inhibitors of the plasmalemmal monoamine reuptake transporters. This research has spanned beyond the last couple decades, and has picked up its pace in recent times, creating numerous phenyltropanes as research into cocaine analogues garners interest to treat addiction.

== Uses ==
=== Addiction ===
The phenyltropane compounds were initially discovered by R. Clarke et al. during research to try and dissociate the stimulant properties of cocaine from its abuse and dependence liability. The first simple phenyltropanes to be made (WIN 35065-2 and WIN 34,428) were shown to be active in behavioral assays only for the ββ-isomers. The activity of the corresponding αβ-isomers was disappointing.

It was later shown that WIN 35065-2 and WIN 34,428 are mostly dopamine selective reuptake inhibitors with some residual actions at the norepinephrine transporter (NET) and serotonin transporter (SERT). The neurotransmitter dopamine is a key candidate for explanation of reinforcing actions drugs. It's unclear to which extent NET is involved in the reinforcing actions of cocaine (an SNDRI). Animal studies show evidence that inhibiting the SERT might reduce cocaine intake.

Animal studies on monkeys and rats have tried to assess the self-administration propensity of phenyltropane analogs alongside cocaine. Frequently the analogs are administered prior to the start of a session to see if they can suppress cocaine lever responding. Most of the analogs behave in ways that might be considered typical for a DRI. In particular, they tend to stimulate locomotor activity, and cause nonselective reductions in cocaine intake relative to food. At the dose that can reduce cocaine intake, most of the analogs require a high DAT occupancy. This would mean that the agonists would need to be behaviorally active at the dose that can bring about reductions in cocaine craving. Most of the analogs will readily substitute for cocaine, although most do not elicit as many lever responses per session because of pharmacokinetic factors. Since these agonists function as reinforcers, there is an obvious concern surrounding their abuse liability.

Nevertheless, a slow onset, long-duration agonist seems like a reasonable approach. Phenyltropanes are widely used in animal studies of drug addiction as they share the stimulant properties and reinforcing effects of cocaine, but with higher potency, less non-specific binding which avoids the cardiotoxicity associated with cocaine.

RTI-336

RTI-336 is an interesting example of a phenyltropane that is being explored in the context of a treatment for cocaine addiction. RTI-336 is a DRI and thus specifically targets the DAT which is responsible for the addictive properties of cocaine. Although there may be a role for NET inhibition and acetylcholinergic actions, clearly it is DA which is the critical neurotransmitter. Dopamine is a biological precursor to noradrenaline. DA is made from tyrosine, which is a non-essential amino acid given that it can be made from phenylalanine.

The more greatly attested habit creating methamphetamine is more serotonergic than the lesser reinforcing amphetamine. While most modern research suggests that 5-HT is negatively correlated with the addiction forming potential of psychostimulants, this is not saying that SRI properties cannot be considered beneficial. In fact, the above was proven by Rothman for releasing agents under the PAL-287 program of related molecules. What was somewhat interesting is that although the reason for the lack of reinforcement of RTI-112 is now well established, closely related RTI-111 was able to behave in ways that might be typical for a nonselective SNDRI such as cocaine. The role of the NET is not completely deleterious. In a recent paper by Rothman on transporter substrates, he establishes that for releasers that are amphetamine-like, discrimination stimulus is more accurately dictated by NE release than DA release. This argument does not mitigate a case against the importance of DA, but is suggestive that catecholamine in general is important. the exact ratio being 50:50 in the case of methylphenidate.

Desipramine and atomoxetine are not reliably self-administered though, whereas most selective DRIs are. SSRIs are not self-administered either. Hence, it should be borne in mind that these neurotransmitters are unlikely to be involved in the addiction forming properties of cocaine and related stimulants. Nevertheless, they are still behaviorally active and will contribute to the effects that such drugs elicit in their users.

Promiscuity among transporters is worth bearing in mind. Monoamine transporters can transport neurotransmitters other than their "native" neurotransmitter. As an example, in the prefrontal cortex where DATs are lower in number, DA is transported mostly by the NET instead. Hence, selective NRIs such as atomoxetine are able to increase the concentration of supracellular (synaptic) DA in this brain region via NET blockade.

Weeding out SERT and NET affinity is desirable in the context that these molecular targets are less relevant to the goals of the treatment program, which is to reduce cocaine intake. It can be clearly seen that RTI-336 has fewer metabolically labile sites than cocaine, and therefore has a longer duration span.

=== Binding ligands ===
These compounds are primarily used in scientific research, as their high binding affinity for monoamine transporters, and the wide range of radiolabelled phenyltropane compounds available with different binding specificities makes them very useful for mapping the distribution of the various monoamine transporters in the brain.

=== Other uses ===
Some phenyltropane derivatives have also been researched for medical use in the treatment of conditions such as Parkinson's disease and Alzheimer's disease, depression, and their strong appetite suppressant effects makes them promising candidates for facilitating weight loss in the treatment of obesity.

== Structure-activity relationships ==
=== Transporter selectivity ===
Compounds are known with a pronounced selectivity for each MAT – dopamine, noradrenaline and the serotonin transporter.

Phenyltropane-based SNDRIs are another possibility.

=== Isomers study ===
All of the tables and graphs shown beneath is from an article published by FIC, et al. 2004. In summary the following observations can be made: Troparil, WIN35428 and RTI-32 are insufficiently potent. This observation is mainly based on the fact that at 100 mg/kg both troparil and WIN35428 produce convulsions. The twist-boat isomers are insufficiently potent in all cases. The trans isomers (alpha,beta) are too weak and might actually be dangerous and cause death. RTI-55, while highly potent, still causes death at a dose of 100 mg/kg. It is advised to consider RTI-229. RTI-31 is the most potent isomers for the DAT and was "safe" (on a relative scale) even in the event of overdose at 100 mg/kg. RTI-51 also looks like a "good" compound, although its synthesis is slightly more difficult than for RTI-31. RTI-51 is less selective for the DAT than RTI-31 and has appreciable SERT affinity also.

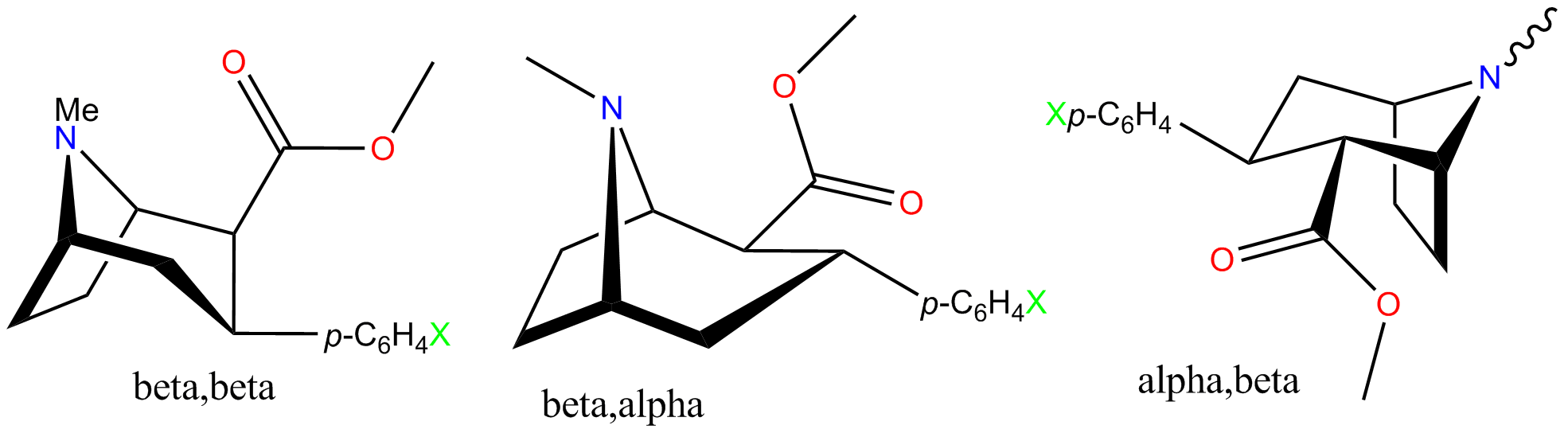

=== MAT binding affinities ===
MAT IC50 (and Ki) of the 3 types of phenyltropane
RTI	X	[^{3}H]CFT	[^{3}H]Nisoxetine	[^{3}H]Paroxetine	N	S	N/D	S/D
—	H	23 ± 5	920 ± 70 (550 ± 44)	1960 ± 61 (178 ± 5.5)	1.7	11	40	85.2
—	F	13.9 ± 2.0	835 ± 45 (503 ± 27)	692 ± 27 (63 ± 2.5)	1.7	11	60.1	49.8
31	Cl	1.1 ± 0.1	37 ± 2.1 (22 ± 1.3)	44.5 ± 1.3 (4.0 ± 0.12)	1.7	11	33.6	40.5
32	Me	1.7 ± 0.3	60 ± 0.53 (36 ± 0.32)	240 ± 27 (23 ± 2.5)	1.7	10	35.3	141
51	Br	1.7 ± 0.2	37.4 ± 5.2 (23 ± 3.1)	10.6 ± 0.24 (0.96 ± 0.02)	1.6	11	22	6.24
55	I	1.3 ± 0.01	36 ± 2.7 (22 ± 1.6)	4.21 ± 0.30 (0.38 ± 0.03)	1.6	11	27.7	3.24
2a	H	101 ± 16	541 ± 69 (271 ± 34)	5700 ± 720 (518 ± 66)	2.0	11	5.36	56.4
2b	F	21.0 ± 0.5	1200 ± 90 (741 ± 55)	5060 ± 490 (460 ± 44)	1.6	11	57.1	241
2c	Cl	3.1 ± 0.6	5.14 ± 1.08 (3.1 ± 0.60)	53 ± 3 (4.8 ± 0.26)	1.7	11	1.66	17.1
2f	Me	10.2 ± 0.8	270 ± 24 (160 ± 14)	4250 ± 420 (390 ± 38)	1.7	11	26.5	417
549	Br	1.7 ± 0.4	32.4 ± 3.5 (16.2 ± 1.7)	84 ± 13.5 (20.6 ± 3.3)	2.0	4.1	19.1	49.4
352	I	2.9 ± 0.2	52.4 ± 4.9 (32 ± 2.0)	64.9 ± 1.97 (5.9 ± 0.18)	1.6	11	18.1	22.4
3a	H	670 ± 90	>10000	>10000	—			
3b	F	325 ± 8	7200 ± 810 (4340 ± 480)	>10000	1.7	—		
3c	Cl	25.0 ± 5	444 ± 29 (222 ± 15)	1450 ± 160 (356 ± 40)	2.0	4.1	17.8	58.0
3f	Me	207 ± 21	2230 ± 380 (1120 ± 190)	>10000	2.0	—		
3d	Br	15.7 ± 0.9	272 ± 25 (136 ± 15)	570 ± 80 (140 ± 20)	2.0	4.1	17.3	36.3
3e	I	22.7 ± 0.9	760 ± 49 (458 ± 30)	66.3 ± 1.8 (6.0 ± 0.16)	1.7	11	33.5	2.92

=== LMA, D.D. and G.B. ===

See also:

== Related compounds ==
Closely related compounds have a varied aryl fragment, like naphthyl, or a varied tropane fragment like with exchanged heteroatom, trop-2-enes, quinuclidines, piperidines.
