= List of cocaine analogues =

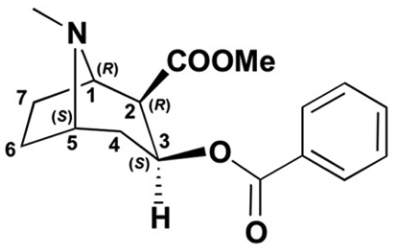
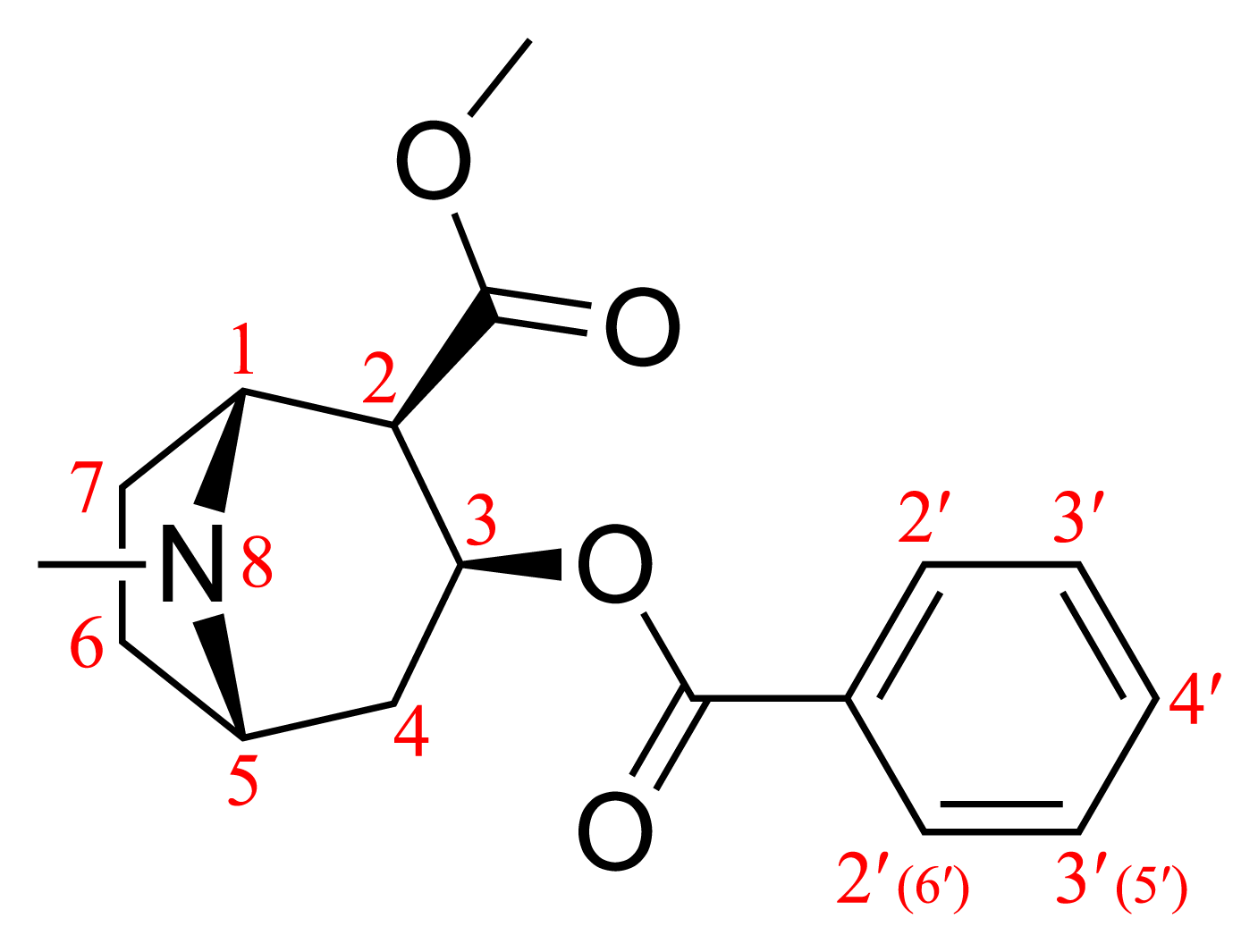
Top: Cocaine in the chair conformation of the tropane-ring, with only its tropane locants given.

Middle: Cocaine with its numerical substitution position locants.
2′ (6′) = ortho, 3′ (5′) = meta & 4′ = para

Bottom: Alternate two-dimensional molecular diagram of cocaine; shown specifically as a protonated, NH+, hydrochloride, and disregarding 3D stereochemistry

This is a list of cocaine analogues. A cocaine analogue is an (usually) artificial construct of a novel chemical compound from (often the starting point of natural) cocaine's molecular structure, with the result product sufficiently similar to cocaine to display similarity in, but alteration to, its chemical function. Within the scope of analogous compounds created from the structure of cocaine, so named "cocaine analogues" retain 3β-benzoyloxy or similar functionality (the term specifically used usually distinguishes from phenyltropanes, but in the broad sense generally, as a category, includes them) on a tropane skeleton, as compared to other stimulants of the kind. Many of the semi-synthetic cocaine analogues proper which have been made & studied have consisted of among the nine following classes of compounds: (Note: ←Page #969 (45th page of article) §III. ¶1. Final line. Last sentence.)

- stereoisomers of cocaine
- 3β-phenyl ring substituted analogues
- 2β-substituted analogues
- N-modified analogues of cocaine
- 3β-carbamoyl analogues
- 3β-alkyl-3-benzyl tropanes
- 6/7-substituted cocaines
- 6-alkyl-3-benzyl tropanes
- piperidine homologues of cocaine

However strict analogues of cocaine would also include such other potential combinations as phenacyltropanes & other carbon branched replacements not listed above. The term may also be loosely used to refer to drugs manufactured from cocaine or having their basis as a total synthesis of cocaine, but modified to alter their effect & QSAR. These include both intracellular sodium channel blocker anaesthetics and stimulant dopamine reuptake inhibitor ligands (such as certain, namely tropane-bridged-excised, piperidines). Additionally, researchers have supported combinatorial approaches for taking the most promising analogues currently elucidated and mixing them to the end of discovering novel & efficacious compounds to optimize their utilization for differing distinct specified purposes. (Note: ←Page #1,018 (94th page of article) 2nd column, 2nd paragraph.)

== Analogs sensu stricto ==
=== Cocaine Stereoisomers ===
Structure	Stereoisomer	S. Singh's alphanumeric assignation	IC_{50} (nM) [^{3}H]WIN 3542 inhibition to rat striatal membranes Mean error standard ≤5% in all cases	IUPAC nomenclature
	R-cocaine (Erythroxyline)		102	methyl(1R,2R,3S,5S)-3-(benzoyloxy)-8-methyl-8-azabicyclo[3.2.1]octane-2-carboxylate
	R-pseudococaine (Delcaine, Depsococaine, Dextrocaine, Isococaine, Psicaine.)	172	15800	methyl(1R,2S,3S,5S)-3-(benzoyloxy)-8-methyl-8-azabicyclo[3.2.1]octane-2-carboxylate
	R-allococaine	173	6160	methyl(1R,2R,3R,5S)-3-(benzoyloxy)-8-methyl-8-azabicyclo[3.2.1]octane-2-carboxylate
	R-allopseudococaine	174	28500	methyl(1R,2S,3R,5S)-3-(benzoyloxy)-8-methyl-8-azabicyclo[3.2.1]octane-2-carboxylate
	S-cocaine	175	15800	methyl(1S,3R,4R,5R)-3-(benzoyl)oxy-8-methyl-8-azabicyclo[3.2.1]octane-4-carboxylate
	S-pseudococaine	176	22500	methyl(1S,3R,4S,5R)-3-(benzoyl)oxy-8-methyl-8-azabicyclo[3.2.1]octane-4-carboxylate
	S-allococaine	177	9820	methyl(1S,3S,4R,5R)-3-(benzoyl)oxy-8-methyl-8-azabicyclo[3.2.1]octane-4-carboxylate
	S-allopseudococaine	178	67700	methyl(1S,3S,4S,5R)-3-(benzoyl)oxy-8-methyl-8-azabicyclo[3.2.1]octane-4-carboxylate

The structure of cocaine with relevant structural motifs for activity at the dopamine transporter highlighted. While it was originally thought that the 2β-carbomethoxy moiety interacted with the DAT through hydrogen bonding, subsequent research has indicated that electrostatic (ionic) interactions are the primary means of interactions with the DAT. (Note: ←Page #940 (16th page of article) underneath Table 8., above §4)

There are eight stereoisomers of cocaine (excluding mesomers and modifications to the internal portion of the tropane ring). (Note: ←Page #970 (46th page of article) Table 27. Figure 29.) Due to the presence of four asymmetric carbon atoms in the 1- & 5- to 8 (N) position bond bridge that could adopt R- & S- configurations, cocaine can be considered to have as many as sixteen stereoisomers. However, geometric constraints imparted by the bridgehead amine allow only eight to be created.

The natural isomerism of cocaine is unstable and prone to epimerization. For example, the end product of cocaine biosynthesis contains an axial C2-carbomethoxy moiety which readily undergoes epimerization to the equatorial position via saponification.

For any 2D structural diagrams where stereochemistry is not indicated, it should be assumed the analogue depicted shares the stereochemical conformation of R-cocaine unless noted otherwise.

=== Arene benzene-ring 2′, 3′, 4′ (5′ & 6′) position (aryl) substitutions ===
==== para-substituted benzoylmethylecgonines ====
Carbon 4′-hydrogen Substitutions (benzene-4′ "para" substituted benzoyloxytropanes) (Note: ←Page #971 (47th page of article) Figure 30. & Page #973 (49th page of article) Table 28.)^{Data-set congruent to, and aggregate with, following tables IC_{50} values}
Structure	S. Singh's alphanumeric assignation (name)	4′=R	DAT [^{3}H]WIN 35428	5-HTT [^{3}H]Paroxetine	NET [^{3}H]Nisoxetine	Selectivity 5-HTT/DAT	Selectivity NET/DAT
	Cocaine	H	249 ± 37	615 ± 120	2500 ± 70	2.5	10.0
non-benzoyloxy analogue comparative ligands _{non-tropane analogue comparative ligands}	11b (WIN 35428) _{(nisoxetine)}^{(fluoxetine)}	F _{—}^{—}	24 ± 4 _{775 ± 20}^{5200 ± 1270}	690 ± 14 _{762 ± 90}^{15 ± 3}	258 ± 40 _{135 ± 21}^{963 ± 158}	28.7 _{1.0}^{0.003}	10.7 _{0.2}^{0.2}
Satendra Singh Rev
Satendra Singh Rev	183a	I	2522 ± 4	1052 ± 23	18458 ± 1073	0.4	7.3
Satendra Singh Rev	183b	Ph	486 ± 63	-	-	-	-
Satendra Singh Rev	183c	OAc	144 ± 2	-	-	-	-
Satendra Singh Rev	183d	OH	158 ± 8	3104 ± 148	601 ± 11	19.6	3.8
Satendra Singh Rev	(4′-Fluorococaine)	F	-	-	-	-	-
Satendra Singh Rev	(para-Isothiocyanatobenzoylecgonine methyl ester) (p-Isococ)	NCS	-	-	-	-	-

para-substituted benzoylmethylecgonines
183a	183b	183c
183d	4'-Fluorococaine	P-ISOCOC

The MAT binding pocket analogous to the lipophilic place on cocaine-like compounds, inclusive of the benzene ring, is approximate to 9 Å in length. Which is only slightly larger than a phenyl ring by itself. (Note: ←Page #982 (58th page of article))

==== meta-substituted benzoylmethylecgonines ====
Carbon 3′-hydrogen Substitutions (benzene-3′ "meta" substituted benzoyloxytropanes) (Note: ←Page #971 (47th page of article) Figure 30 & Page #971 (47th page of article) Figure 30 & Page #973 (49th page of article) Table 28)^{Data-set congruent to, and aggregate with, preceding and following tables IC_{50} values}
Structure	S. Singh's alphanumeric assignation (name)	3′=R	DAT [^{3}H]WIN 35428	5-HTT [^{3}H]Paroxetine	NET [^{3}H]Nisoxetine	Selectivity 5-HTT/DAT	Selectivity NET/DAT
	(cocaine)	H	249 ± 37	615 ± 120	2500 ± 70	2.5	10.0
Satendra Singh Rev
Satendra Singh Rev	184a	I	325^{ɑ}	-	-	-	-
Satendra Singh Rev	184b	OH	1183 ± 115	793 ± 33	3760 ± 589	0.7	3.2
Satendra Singh Rev	191	OBn	-	-	-	-	-
Satendra Singh Rev	(m-Isococ)	NCS	-	-	-	-	-

- ^{ɑ}IC_{50} value for displacement of [^{3}H]cocaine

meta-substituted benzoylmethylecgonines
184a	184b	m-ISOCOC	C3-Benzyloxycocaine

==== ortho-substituted benzoylmethylecgonines ====
Carbon 2′-hydrogen Substitutions (benzene-2′ "ortho" substituted benzoyloxytropanes) (Note: ←Page #971 (47th page of article) Figure 30 & Page #971 (47th page of article) Figure 30 & Page #973 (49th page of article) Table 28)^{Data-set congruent to, and aggregate with, preceding and following tables IC_{50} values}
Structure	S. Singh's alphanumeric assignation (name)	2′=R	DAT [^{3}H]WIN 35428	5-HTT [^{3}H]Paroxetine	NET [^{3}H]Nisoxetine	Selectivity 5-HTT/DAT	Selectivity NET/DAT
	Cocaine	H	249 ± 37	615 ± 120	2500 ± 70	2.5	10.0
Satendra Singh Rev
Satendra Singh Rev	185a	I	350^{ɑ}	-	-	-	-
Satendra Singh Rev	185b	F	604 ± 67	1770 ± 309	1392 ± 173	2.9	2.3
Satendra Singh Rev	185c (2′-Acetoxycocaine)	OAc	70 ± 1	219 ± 20	72 ± 9	3.1	1.0
Satendra Singh Rev	185d (2′-Hydroxycocaine)	OH	25 ± 4	143 ± 21	48 ± 2	5.7	1.9

- ^{ɑ}IC_{50} value for displacement of [^{3}H]cocaine

ortho-substituted benzoylmethylecgonines
185a	185b	185c	185d

The hydroxylated 2′-OH analogue exhibited a tenfold increase in potency over cocaine. (Note: ←Page #972 (48th page of article) ¶2, Line 10.)

==== Manifold and termination benzoyloxy phenyl-substitutions ====
Vanillylmethylecgonine	186b

Multi-substitutions (substitutions of substitutions; e.g. meta- & para-) or manifold ("many-fold") substituted analogues are analogues where more than one modification from the parent molecule takes place (having numerous intermediary constituents). These are created with often surprising structure–activity relationship results extrapolated therefrom. It is even a common case where two separate substitutions can each yield a weaker, lower affinity or even wholly non-efficacious compound respectively; but due to findings that oftentimes, when used together, such two mutually inferior changes being added in tandem to one analogue has the potential to make the resultant derivative display much greater efficacy, affinity, selectivity &/or strength than even the parent compound; which otherwise was compromised by either of those two alternations when made alone.

Manifold Compositions of Terminating Phenyl Ring Substitutions (Multiple benzene-2′,3′ & 4′ combined substituted benzoyloxytropanes) (Note: ←Page #971 (47th page of article) Figure 30 & Page #971 (47th page of article) Figure 30 & Page #973 (49th page of article) Table 28)^{Data-set (excepting instanced references inside table) congruent to, and aggregate with, preceding and following tables IC_{50} values}
Structure	S. Singh's alphanumeric assignation (name)	ortho-2′=R	meta-3′=R	para-4′=R	DAT [^{3}H]WIN 35428	5-HTT [^{3}H]Paroxetine	NET [^{3}H]Nisoxetine	Selectivity 5-HTT/DAT	Selectivity NET/DAT
	186	HO	H	I	215 ± 19	195 ± 10	1021 ± 75	0.9	4.7
	(Vanillylmethylecgonine)	H	OCH_{3}	OH	-	-	-	-	-

Terminating Phenyl Carbon Ring Fusions & Alterations (Note: ←Page #971 (47th page of article) Figure 30 & Page #971 (47th page of article) Figure 30 & Page #973 (49th page of article) Table 28)^{Data-set congruent to, and aggregate with, preceding table IC_{50} values}
Structure	S. Singh's alphanumeric assignation (name)	C=R	DAT [^{3}H]Cocaine (IC_{50})
	187	1-naphthalene	742 ± 48
	188	2-naphthalene	327 ± 63

=== Benzoyl and carbomethoxy branch modifications ===
Spirocyclic benzoyl branch modification that fits criteria as a cocaine analog and a phenyltropane both (tropane 2nd locant ester rendered in given depiction shows, as has been attested, to only having been successfully alpha configured)

- Benzoylthiomethylecgonine

A sulfur in place of the oxygen at the benzoyl ester single bond results in a lower electronegativity than that of cocaine.

- Cocaine reverse ester (REC)

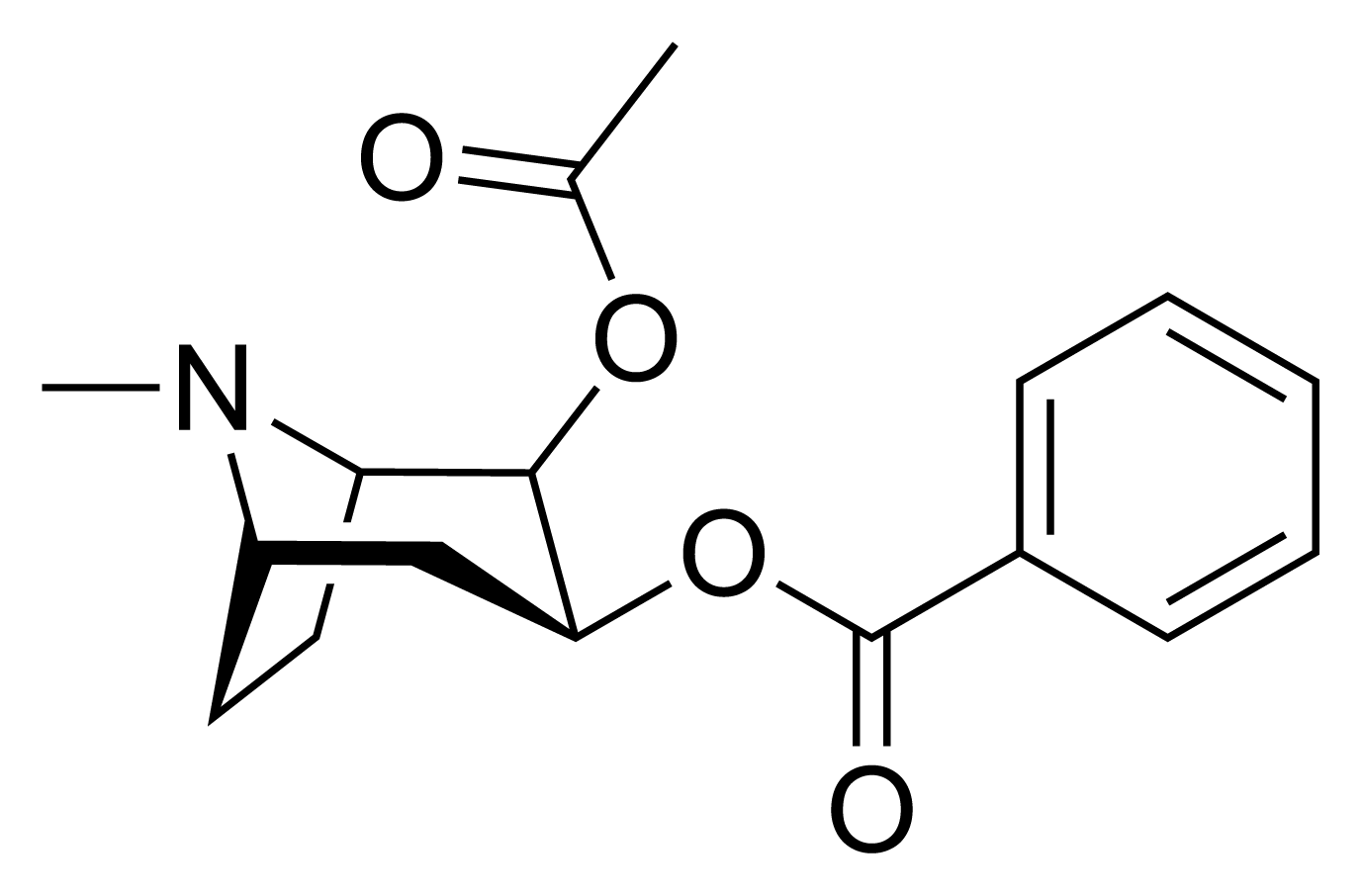
REC is a cocaine analogue which contains a "reversed" C2 carbomethoxy moiety. In animal studies, REC lacked cocaine-like stimulant effects.

=== C1-tropane-ring hydrogen—substitutions ===
C1 substitutions K_{i} values for uptake inhibition obtained on HEK-293 heterologously expressed human monoamine transporter cells.
Structure	Trivial name	R (C1 moiety)	K_{i} (nM) @ DAT	K_{i} (nM) @ SERT	K_{i} (nM) @ NET	σ_{1} affinity K_{i}	σ_{2} affinity K_{i}	IC_{50} (μM) Na+ inhibition (Vertridine-Stimulated influx of sodium channels in Neocortical neurons)^{c}	LogP (XLogP3 algorithm, Cheng et al., 2007)
	(—)-Cocaine	H	326 ± 106	513 ± 143	358 ± 69	6.7 ± 0.3 μM^{d}	"significant"	6.99 ± 2.43	2.30
	(—)-1-methyl-cocaine	Me	163 ± 23	435 ± 77	488 ± 101	"unappreciable"	1.13 μM	16.01 ± 1.90	2.67
	(—)-1-ethyl-cocaine	Et	95.1 ± 17.0^{ɑ}	1,106 ± 112	598 ± 179	—	—	—	3.20
	(—)-1-n-propyl-cocaine	n-Pr	871 ± 205^{ɑ}	2,949 ± 462^{b}	796 ± 195	—	—	—	3.56
	(—)-1-n-pentyl-cocaine	n-C_{5}H_{11}	1,272 ± 199^{b}	1,866 ± 400^{ɑ}	1,596 ± 21^{b}	—	—	—	4.64
	(—)-1-phenyl-cocaine	Ph	32.3 ± 5.7^{b}	974 ± 308	1,980 ± 99^{b}	524 nM	198 nM	0.29 ± 0.07	3.77

- ^{ɑ}, P < 0.05 compared with (—)-cocaine (one-way ANOVA followed by Dunnett's multiple comparisons test)
- ^{b}, P < 0.01 compared with (—)-cocaine (one-way ANOVA followed by Dunnett's multiple comparisons test)
- ^{c}Lidocaine was found to have a value of 39.6 ± 2.4, the weakest of all tested.
- ^{d}Same reference gives 25.9 ± 2.4 μM for (+)-cocaine and 13.6 ± 1.3 μM for norcocaine. Comparably it gives 12.7 ± 1.5 μM for the sigmaergic affinity of (+)-amphetamine. Another reference gives 1.7-6.7 μM for (—)-cocaine. All values K_{i}.
- Using same data-set as above table, the following compounds were found to compare as:
  - CFT @ DAT = 39.2 ± 7.1 (n = 5)
  - fluoxetine @ SERT = 27.3 ± 9.2 (n = 3)
  - desipramine @ NET = 2.74 ± 0.59 (n = 3)

Cocaine analogs substituting the C1-tropane ring position, requiring sulfinimine (N-sulfinyl-imine) chemistry (before the innovation of which were untenable) which bind unlike the typical configuration at DAT (open to out) as cocaine (with its terminal D79-Y156 distance of 6.03 Å), or in the atypical (closed to out) conformation of the benztropines (3.29 Å). Though closer to the open to out: (—)-1-methyl-cocaine = 4.40 Å & (—)-1-phenyl-cocaine = 4.89 Å, and exhibiting preferential interaction with outward facing DAT conformation, they appear to have the lack of behavioral stimulation as-like the closed to out type. Despite having non-stimulant behavior profiles, they still seem to have anti-depressant behavioral profiles.

The C1 phenyl analog is ten times stronger than cocaine as a dopamine reuptake pump ligand, and twenty four times stronger as a local anesthetic (voltage-dependent Na+ channel blocker), whereas the C1 methyl analog is 2.3 times less potent as a local anesthetic.

cf. hydroxytropacocaine for a natural alkaloid (lacking however, the 2-position carbmethoxy) that is a C1 substituent with a hydroxy group.

=== 2β-substitutions ===
Direct 2β Substitutions (Note: ←Page #973 (49th page of article) §C. & Page #974 (50th page of article) Figure 31 & Page #976 (52nd page of article) Table 29.)^{(IC_{50} nM values)}
Structure	S. Singh's alphanumeric assignation (name)	R	DAT [^{3}H]WIN 35428	5-HTT [^{3}H]Paroxetine	NET [^{3}H]Nisoxetine	Selectivity 5-HTT/DAT	Selectivity NET/DAT
Satendra Singh Rev
Satendra Singh Rev	(Cocaine)	Me	89 ± 4.8	1045 ± 89	3298 ± 293	11.7	37.0
Satendra Singh Rev	196a (Cocaethylene)	Et	195 ± 45	5801 ± 493	10000 ± 751	29.7	51.3
Satendra Singh Rev	196b	n-Pr	196 ± 46	4517 ± 430	6124 ± 262	23.3	31.2
Satendra Singh Rev	196c	i-Pr	219 ± 48	25224 ± 1498	30384 ± 1685	115	139
Satendra Singh Rev	196d	Ph	112 ± 31	33666 ± 3330	31024 ± 1909	300	277
Satendra Singh Rev	196e	Bn	257 ± 14	302 ± 23	20794 ± 950	1.2	80.9
Satendra Singh Rev	196f	β-phenethyl	181 ± 10	615 ± 52	19944 ± 1026	3.4	110
Satendra Singh Rev	196g	γ-phenylpropyl	147 ± 19	374 ± 15	4893 ± 344	2.5	33.3
Satendra Singh Rev	196h	cinnamyl	371 ± 15	368 ± 6.3	68931 ± 3476	1.0	186
Satendra Singh Rev	196i	p-NO_{2}-β-phenethyl	601 ± 28	-	-	-	-
Satendra Singh Rev	196j	p-Cl-β-phenethyl	271 ± 12	-	-	-	-
Satendra Singh Rev	196k	p-NH_{2}-β-phenethyl	72 ± 7	-	-	-	-
Satendra Singh Rev	196l	p-NCS-β-phenethyl	196 ± 14	-	-	-	-
Satendra Singh Rev	196m	p-azido-β-phenethyl	227 ± 19	-	-	-	-
Satendra Singh Rev	196n	(p-NHCOCH_{2}Br)β-phenethyl	61 ± 6	-	-	-	-
Satendra Singh Rev	196o	(p-NHCO(CH_{2})_{2}CO_{2}Et)β-phenethyl	86 ± 4	-	-	-	-
Satendra Singh Rev	197a	NH_{2}	753 ± 41.3	13725 ± 1256	3981 ± 229	18.2	5.3
Satendra Singh Rev	197b	-NMe_{2}	127 ± 6.36	143713 ± 8854	7329 ± 158	1131	57.7
Satendra Singh Rev	197c	-N(OMe)Me	60 ± 6.4	28162 ± 2565	3935 ± 266	469	65.6
Satendra Singh Rev	197d	-NHMe	2424 ± 118	44798 ± 2105	4213 ± 206	18.5	1.7
Satendra Singh Rev	197e (Benzoylecgonine)	-OH	195000	-	-	-	-
Satendra Singh Rev	197f	HOCH_{2}-	561 ± 149	-	-	-	-
Satendra Singh Rev	197g (Tropacocaine)	H	5180 ± 1160	-	-	-	-

2β-Substituted Analogue Structures
196a (Cocaethylene)	196b	196c	196d	196e
196f	196g	196h	196i	196j
196k	196l	196m	196n	196o
197a	197b	197c	197d	197e
197f	197g			

Compounds 196e-h possess greater SERT affinity than cocaine, but possess weaker NET/DAT affinities (with the exception of 196g at NET). Compounds 196k, 196n, 196o, and 197c all possess greater DAT affinity than cocaine. Compound 197b (dimethyl amide) displayed a 1,131-fold increased selectivity in affinity over the serotonin transporter, with only slight reductions in potency for the dopamine & norepinephrine transporters. (Note: ←Page #974 (50th page of article) Final ¶ (5th), Second line.) Whereas 197c (Weinreb amide, N-methoxy-N-methyl amide) had a 469× increase at SERT, with greater affinity for DAT than cocaine and an equal NET affinity. (Note: ←Page #975 (51st page of article) First ¶, first line.) 197b was 137×, and 196c 27× less potent at binding to the serotonin transporter, but both had a NET / DAT ratio that made for a better dopaminergic than cocaine. (Note: ←Page #975 (51st page of article) First ¶, 4th line.) The consideration that large, bulky C2 substituents would alter the spatial conformation of the tropane ring system by distorting the piperidine portion of the system and thus hamper binding (Note: ←Page #974 (50st page of article) First (left) column, third ¶) appears to be unfounded. (Note: ←Page #937 (13th page of article) Second (right) column, first ¶. Above/before §2)

Benzoylecgonine (197e) is the inactive primary metabolite of cocaine generated through hydrolysis of the C2 methyl ester. In vitro binding studies indicate that benzoylecgonine is ~2,200x less potent than cocaine at the dopamine transporter, possibly due to zwitterion formation preventing strong DAT binding. In contrast to in vitro studies, the lack of activity observed in in vivo studies is likely the result of reduced blood–brain barrier penetration than formation of a zwitterion. (Note: ←Page #974 (50st page of article) First (left) column, fourth ¶)

==== Bioisostere 2-position carbmethoxy-ester functional replacements ====
2β-isoxazole and isoxazoline ring containing analogues (Note: ←Page #974 (50th page of article) Figure 31 & Page #977 (53rd page of article) Table 30.) (Note: ←Page #974 (50th page of article) Figure 31 & Page #977 (53rd page of article) Table 30.) (Note: ←Page #974 (50th page of article) Figure 31 & Page #977 (53rd page of article) Table 30.)^{IC_{50} nM values}
Structure	S. Singh's alphanumeric assignation (name)	R	[^{3}H]Mazindol	[^{3}H]DA	Selectivity Uptake/Binding
	(Cocaine)	(H)	580 ± 70	570 ± 180	1.0
Satendra Singh Rev
Satendra Singh Rev	198a	H	520 ± 40	260 ± 70	0.5
Satendra Singh Rev	198b	CO_{2}Et (5′-carboethoxy-)	120 ± 10	290 ± 40	2.4
Satendra Singh Rev	198c	BOC	2230 ± 220	1820 ± 810	0.8
Satendra Singh Rev	198d	Ph	2000 ± 640	2920 ± 1620	1.5
Satendra Singh Rev	198e	CH=CHCO_{2}Me	3600 ± 400	3590 ± 1180	1.0
	199a	β(or R)CO_{2}Et	710 ± 150	1060 ± 340	1.5
	199b	α(or S)CO_{2}Et	5830 ± 630	8460 ± 620	1.4
	200		880 ± 350	400 ± 140	0.4

2β-isoxazole and isoxazoline ring containing analogues
198a	198b	198c	198d
198e	199a	199b	200

==== Vinylogous 2β-position carbmethoxy-ester functional replacements ====
vinylogous 2β analogues (Note: ←Page #974 (50th page of article) Figure 31 & Page #977 (53rd page of article) Table 30.)^{Data-set congruent to, and aggregate with, preceding table IC_{50} nM values}
Structure	S. Singh's alphanumeric assignation	R	[^{3}H]Mazindol	[^{3}H]DA	Selectivity Uptake/Binding
	Cocaine		580 ± 70	570 ± 180	1
	201a	H	1730 ± 550	1120 ± 390	0.6
	201b	Cl	222 ± 49	368 ± 190	1.6
	201c	CO_{2}Et	50 ± 10	130 ± 10	2.6
	201d	CH=CHCO_{2}Et	1220 ± 100	870 ± 50	0.7
	201e	PO(OEt)_{2}	4850 ± 470	5500 ± 70	1.1

Vinylogous 2β analogues
201a	201b	201c	201d	201e

Compounds 201b & 201c were significantly more potent than cocaine while compounds 201a, 201d & 201e were significantly less potent. This finding indicates that the presence of a hydrogen bond acceptor (i.e. carbomethoxy) at the 2β position is not absolutely necessary for the creation of high affinity cocaine analogues. (Note: ←Page #976 (52nd page of article))

Miscellaneous 2β-substituted cocaine analogues
[^{2}H_{5}-phenyl]-cocaine	HPBE	[^{2}H_{3}-N-methyl]-cocaine	C2-ethyl-OSO_{2}CF_{2} cocaine	2-[(2-methoxy-2-oxoethoxy)methyl] cocaine
Reagent analogue rendered from its cocaine parent by replacing a cluster of several adjacent hydrogens (from among the hydrogens that comprise the entire circumference common to every basic molecular perimeter) with deuterium, in an equivalent but localized spread or cluster.	Hydroxypropylbenzoylecgonine (HPBE), which imparts the topical analgesic effect in the preparation Esterom.	Reagent analogue used in radio-labeling ligand binding sites.	caption	

=== N-modifications ===
Nitrogen Substitutions Mazindol comparison table (^{ɑ}β-CFT comparison notation) (Note: ←Page #978 (54th page of article) §D & Page #980 (56th page of article) Figure 33 & Page #981 (57th page of article) Table 32.)
Compound	S. Singh's alphanumeric assignation (name)	N8-R	[^{3}H]Mazindol binding	[^{3}H]DA uptake	Selectivity Uptake/Binding
	217 (Cocaine methiodide)	-	10700 ± 1530^{ɑ}	-	-
Satendra Singh Rev	(Cocaine)	CH_{3}	280 ± 60; 102^{ɑ}	320 ± 10	1.1
Satendra Singh Rev	218 (Norcocaine)	H	303 ± 59^{ɑ}	-	-
Satendra Singh Rev	219a	Bn	668 ± 67^{ɑ}	-	-
Satendra Singh Rev	219b	Ac	3370 ± 1080^{ɑ}	-	-
Satendra Singh Rev	219c	CH_{2}CH_{2}OH	700 ± 100	1600 ± 200	2.3
Satendra Singh Rev	219d	CH_{2}CO_{2}CH_{3}	480 ± 40	1600 ± 100	3.3
Satendra Singh Rev	219e	CH_{2}CO_{2}H	380 ± 20	2100 ± 400	5.5
Satendra Singh Rev	220a	SO_{2}CH_{3} (Ms)	1290 ± 80	1970 ± 70	1.5
Satendra Singh Rev	220b	SO_{2}CF_{3} (Tf)	330 ± 30	760 ± 20	2.3
Satendra Singh Rev	220c	SO_{2}NCO	120 ± 10	160 ± 10	1.3
Satendra Singh Rev	220d	SO_{2}Ph	20800 ± 3500	61000	2.9
Satendra Singh Rev	220e	SO_{2}C_{6}H_{4}-4-NO_{2} (nosyl)	5720 ± 1140	18800 ± 90	3.3
Satendra Singh Rev	220f	SO_{2}C_{6}H_{4}-4-OCH_{3}	6820 ± 580	16400 ± 1400	2.4
Satendra Singh Rev	221a	NO	99500 ± 12300	231700 ± 39500	2.3
Satendra Singh Rev	221b	NO_{2}	7500 ± 900	21200 ± 600	2.8
Satendra Singh Rev	221c	NHCOCH_{3}	>1000000	>1000000	-
Satendra Singh Rev	221d	NH_{2}	-	-	-

- ^{ɑ}IC_{50} (nM) for displacement of [^{3}H]WIN 35428

N-Modified Analogue Structures
Norcocaine (218)	219a	219b	219c
219d	219e	220a	220b
220c	220d	220e	220f
221a	221b	221c	221d

Miscellaneous N-modified cocaine analogues
N6 Regioisomer	N7 Regioisomer	ortho-Phenyl N7 Regioisomer	8-Oxa cocaine (cf Meltzer with PTs)

=== Tricyclic cocaine analogues ===
==== 8 to 2 tethered analogues ====
Activity at monoamine transporters: Binding Affinities & MAT Inhibition of Bridged Phenyltropanes K_{i} (nM) (Note: ←Page #964 (39th page of article) Table 23.)
Compound (S. Singh's #)	Structure	[^{3}H]Mazindol binding	[^{3}H]DA uptake	[^{3}H]5-HT uptake	[^{3}H]NE uptake	selectivity [^{3}H]5-HT/[^{3}H]DA
cocaine		375 ± 68	423 ± 147	155 ± 40	83.3 ± 1.5	0.4
(–)-128		54.3 ± 10.2	60.3 ± 0.4	1.76 ± 0.23	5.24 ± 0.07	0.03
(+)-128		79 ± 19	114 ± 28	1.48 ± 0.07	4.62 ± 0.31	0.01
(±)-128		61.7 ± 8.5	60.3 ± 0.4	2.32 ± 0.23	2.69 ± 0.12	0.04
129		6.86 ± 0.43	24.0 ± 1.3	1.77 ± 0.04	1.06 ± 0.03	0.07
130a		17.2 ± 1.13	10.2 ± 1.4	78.9 ± 0.9	15.0 ± 0.4	7.8
131a		4.00 ± 0.07	2.23 ± 0.12	14.0 ± 0.6	2.99 ± 0.17	6.3
131b		3.61 ± 0.43	11.3 ± 1.1	25.7 ± 4.3	4.43 ± 0.01	2.3
132a		13.7 ± 0.8	14.2 ± 0.1	618 ± 87	3.84 ± 0.35	43.5
133a		149 ± 6	149 ± 2	810 ± 80	51.7 ± 12	5.4

See N-front & back bridged phenyltropanes.

Derivations upon fusions of the tropane's nitrogen bridge (Note: ←Page #980 (56th page of article) Scheme 52.)
Compound	S. Singh's alphanumeric assignation	[^{3}H]Mazindol	[^{3}H]DA	Selectivity Uptake/Binding
	222	44900 ± 6200	115000 ± 15700	2.6

Back-bridged cocaine analogues are considered more akin to untethered cocaine analogs & phenyltropane derivatives (where the nitrogen lone pair is not fixed or constrained) and better mimics their affinities. This is due to when the eighth carbon tropane position is freely rotatable and unbound it preferably occupies the axial position as defining its least energy & most unhindered state. In front-bridged analogs the nitrogen lone pairings rigid fixity makes it reside in an equatorial placing for the piperidine ring-part of the tropane nucleus, pointing to the two-carbon & three methylene unit bridgehead; giving the attested front-bridged cocaine analogues preference for SERT over DAT. (Note: ←Page #963 (39th page of article) 2nd (right side) column, 2nd paragraph.)

==== 8 to 3 tethered analogues ====
Thiophene tricyclic tropane analogues
Structure	Compound	R	X	[^{3}H]DA Uptake	[^{3}H]5-HT Uptake	[^{3}H]NE Uptake	5-HT/DA Selectivity	NE/DA Selectivity
	Cocaine			259 ± 19.9	155 ± 0.4	108 ± 3.5	0.60	0.42
	5a	H	CO_{2}Me	268 ± 16.6	2046 ± 42	26.4 ± 1.9	7.63	0.10
	5b	Me	CO_{2}Me	403 ± 20	179 ± 38	4.9 ± 0.2	0.44	0.01
	5c	I	CO_{2}Me	368 ± 1.6	29 ± 1.6	5 ± 1.3	0.08	0.01
	7	H	CO_{2}iPr	428 ± 45.7	1150 ± 1.6	52.3 ± 12.0	2.69	0.12
	8	H	CH_{2}OH	~3000	~1000	~300	~0.33	~ 0.1
	9	H	CH_{2}OAc	610 ± 53	1530 ± 150	283 ± 16	2.51	0.46
	10	H	CH_{2}OCOC(CH_{3})_{3}	1020 ± 70	168 ± 53.5	1180 ± 130	0.16	1.16
	11	H	CH_{2}OCOPh	1750 ± 140	1.53 ± 0.19	894 ± 126	0.0009	0.51
	12	H	CH_{2}OCO-2-naphthyl	1678 ± 124	169 ± 16	1234 ± 166	0.10	0.74
	13	H	CH_{2}NHCOCH_{3}	6140 ± 50	13330 ± 3150	2430 ± 340	2.17	0.39
	14	H	CH_{2}NHCO_{2}C(CH_{3})_{3}	2300 ± 380	2360 ± 30	1700 ± 60	1.03	0.74

Conformationally constrained tricyclic tropane analogues
Structure	Compound	R	X	[^{3}H]DA Uptake	[^{3}H]5-HT Uptake	[^{3}H]NE Uptake	DA/5-HT Selectivity	NE/DA Selectivity
	Cocaine			423 ± 147	155 ± 0.4	108 ± 3.5	2.7	0.26
	8a	4-F	CO_{2}Me	6620 ± 460	335 ± 45	584 ± 163	2.7	0.26
	8b	4-Cl	CO_{2}Me	853 ± 58	34.3 ± 2.9	208 ± 111	24.8	0.24
	8c	3-Cl	CO_{2}Me	7780 ± 1580	53.6 ± 17.2	231 ± 44	145	0.03
	8d	4-Br	CO_{2}Me	495 ± 13	11 ± 3	178 ± 9	45	0.36
	8e	4-I	CO_{2}Me	764 ± 11	21.9 ± 0.3	213 ± 31	34.9	0.28
	8f	4-CF_{3}	CO_{2}Me	N/T	12.6 ± 0.5	1830 ± 211	N/T	N/T
	8g	H	CO_{2}Me	481 ± 11	1140 ± 70	53 ± 16	0.42	0.11
	8h	4-Me	CO_{2}Me	649 ± 2	15 ± 0.4	146 ± 28	43.3	0.22
	8i	4-OCH_{3}	CO_{2}Me	3130 ± 160	56 ± 4	187 ± 5	55.9	0.06
	8j	4-iPr	CO_{2}Me	N/T	10.2 ± 0.4	1110 ± 200	N/T	N/T
	8k	3,4-Cl_{2}	CO_{2}Me	1920 ± 260	20 ± 1	1000 ± 280	96	0.52
	8l	2,3-Cl_{2}	CO_{2}Me	950 ± 107	354 ± 188	1210 ± 358	2.4	1.42
	8m	3,5-Cl_{2}	CO_{2}Me	5600 ± 400	437 ± 0.3	4100 ± 500	12.8	0.73
	8n	3,4-F_{2}	CO_{2}Me	7440 ± 19	101 ± 8.7	394 ± 98	73.7	0.05
	8o	4-Br-3-Cl	CO_{2}Me	5420 ± 940	2.3 ± 0.1	459 ± 80	2360	0.08
	8p	3-Cl-4-I	CO_{2}Me	3140 ± 450	1.8 ± 0.3	272 ± 55	1740	0.09
	8q	2-Cl-4-I	CO_{2}Me	6640 ± 2080	74 ± 12.2	508 ± 21	89.7	0.08
	8r	3-Cl-4-Me	CO_{2}Me	>10000	6.4 ± 1.3	198 ± 10	>1560	<0.02
	8s	3,4-Me_{2}	CO_{2}Me	N/T	10.1 ± 1.1	659 ± 128	N/T	N/T
	8t	1-Naphthyl	CO_{2}Me	9720 ± 700	121 ± 3	5370 ± 580	80.3	0.55
	8u	2-Naphthyl	CO_{2}Me	735 ± 235	21 ± 9.9	157 ± 13	35	0.21
	8v	1-Pyrenyl	CO_{2}Me	9920 ± 906	860 ± 20.6	N/T	11.5	N/T
	8w	9-Phenanthryl	CO_{2}Me	1640 ± 30	233 ± 44	13000 ± 1300	39.2	0.86

- "N/T" = "not tested"

=== Tropane ring contraction (azabornane) analogues ===
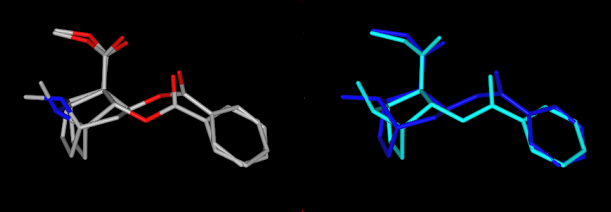
Comparison of tropane ring versus the norbornane in overlay emphasizing the conformational differences of the benzoyl branch between the tropane ring system (dark blue on right) and norbornane ring system (light blue on right).

7-Azabicyclo[2.2.1]heptane Derivatives (Note: ←Page #967 (43rd page of article) §C. & Page #967 (43rd page of article) Table 25)
Structure	S. Singh's alphanumeric assignation (name)	DAT [^{3}H]WIN 35428 K_{i} (nM)
	(Cocaine)	89 ± 4.8
	155a	60400 ± 4800
	155b	96500 ± 42
	155c	5620 ± 390
	155d	18900 ± 1700

=== 6/7 tropane position methoxycocaine & methoxypseudococaine analogues ===
Phenylsulfanyl, C2-C3 unsaturated nonisomeric (C2 inclusive) C4 chloro analog.

Substitutions upon the 6 & 7 positions of the tropane (Note: ←Page #982 (58th page of article) §G & Page #983 (59th page of article) Figure 36 & Page #984 (60th page of article) Table 35.)
Compound	S. Singh's alphanumeric assignation (name)	X	K_{i} (nM) [^{3}H]Mazindol binding	K_{i} (nM) [^{3}H]DA uptake	Selectivity Uptake/Binding
	(Cocaine)		280 ± 60	320 ± 10	1.1
	(Pseudococaine)		10400 ± 300	13800 ± 1500	1.3
	225a	2β, 6β-OCH_{3}	98000 ± 12000	68000 ± 5000	0.7
	225b	2α, 6β-OCH_{3}	190000 ± 11000	510000 ± 110000	2.7
	225c	2β, 7β-OCH_{3}	4200 ± 100	6100 ± 200	1.4
	225d	2α, 7β-OCH_{3}	45000 ± 5000	110000 ± 4000	2.4
	225e	2α, 7α-OCH_{3}	54000 ± 3000	200000 ± 70000	3.7

=== 3β-position 2′—(6′) & 2β-substitution combination analogues ===
4′-Iodococaine-2β-substituted analogues (Note: ←Page #979 (55th page of article) Table 31.)
Compound	S. Singh's alphanumeric assignation	2β-R	C2′-R	IC_{50} (nM) (displacement of [^{3}H]WIN 35428)
	211a	CH_{2}OH	H	6214 ± 1269
	211b	CH_{2}OCOCH_{3}	H	2995 ± 223
	211c	CONHCH_{3}	H	>100000
	211d	CO_{2}Et	H	2031 ± 190
	211e	CO_{2}-i-Pr	H	1377 ± 10
	211f	CO_{2}Ph	H	2019 ± 253
	211g	CO_{2}CH_{2}Ph	H	4602 ± 325
	211h	3-phenyl-1,2,4-oxadiazole	H	3459 ± 60
	211i	CH=CH_{2}	H	2165 ± 253
	211j	CH_{2}CH_{3}	H	2692 ± 486
	212	CO_{2}-i-Pr	HO	663 ± 70; 4507 ± 13^{ɑ} 34838 ± 796^{b}

- ^{ɑ}For displacement of [^{3}H]paroxetine (5-HTT & NET)
- ^{b}For displacement of [^{3}H]nisoxetine (5-HTT & NET)

4′-Iodococaine-2β-substituted analogues
211a	211b	211c	211d	211e
211f	211g	211h	211i	211j

=== 3β-Carbamoyl analogues ===
3-position carbamoyl linkage substituting benzoyloxy analogues (Note: ←Page #981 (57th page of article) §E & Page #982 (58th page of article) Table 33.)
Compound	S. Singh's alphanumeric assignation (name)	X	IC_{50} (nM) inhibition of [^{3}H]Cocaine binding (Rat Striatal Tissue)	IC_{50} (nM) inhibition of [^{3}H]DA uptake (Rat Striatal Tissue)	Selectivity uptake/binding
	(Cocaine)	(H)	70 ± 10	210 ± 70	3.0
	223a	H	5600 ± 700	52600 ± 3000	9.4
	223b	4-NO_{2}	1090 ± 250	5700 ± 1200	5.2
	223c	4-NH_{2}	63300 ± 12200	>100000	-
	223d	4-N_{3}	1000 ± 240	1180 ± 360	1.2
	223e	4-NCS	260 ± 60	490 ± 80	1.9
	223f	3-NO_{2}	37 ± 10	178 ± 23	4.8
	223g	3-NH_{2}	2070 ± 340	23100 ± 900	11.1
	223h	3-N_{3}	630 ± 150	3900 ± 1590	6.2
	223i	3-NCS	960 ± 210	4900 ± 420	5.1

3β-Carbamoyl analogues
223a	223b	223c
223d	223e	223f
223g	223h	223i

=== Phenyl 3-position linkage substitutions ===
A 3-Dimensional (stick-&-ball) rendering of Troparil: A structural analogue of cocaine with omitted -COO- linkage – a parent compound of many MAT ligands; those of the phenyltropane class. (Here it is depicted in an unfavourable conformation of the O-Me; The methyl has to be at the other oxygen and trans to optimize its functional stimulation.)

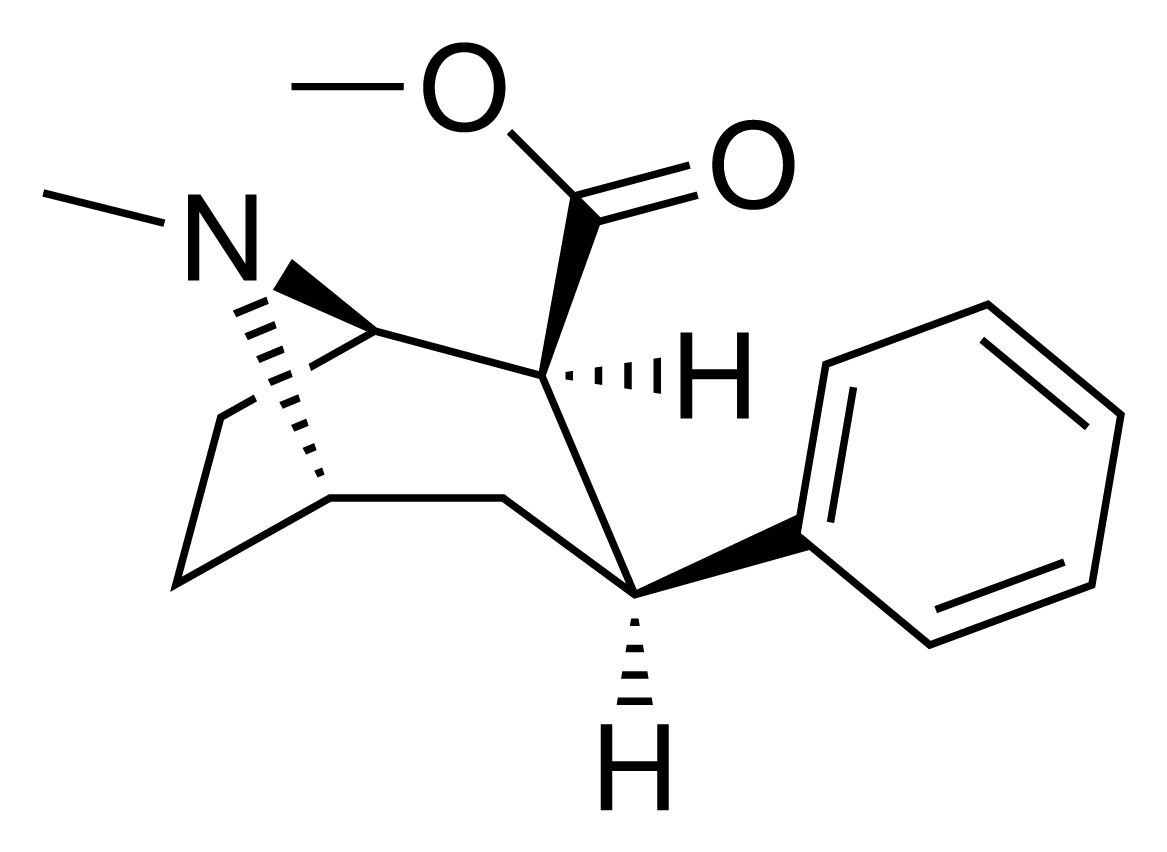
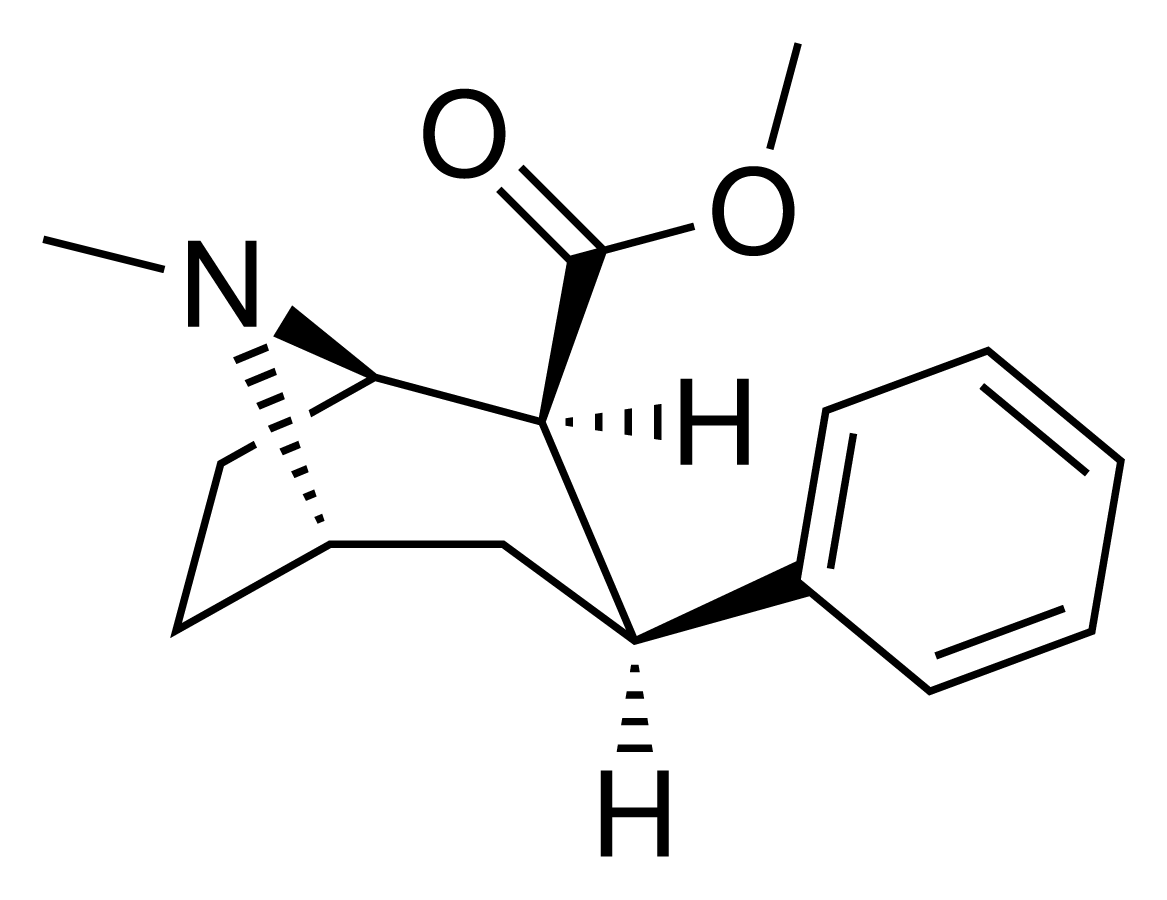
The top image above is a 2-Dimensional emulation of the orientation for the animated 3D image to the far right, with a methoxy that is distal from the phenyl group and cis. While the alternate image below that to its bottom shown above is one with the carboxyl methyl group proximal to the phenyl, in its optimum conformation, with a likewise optimum trans configuration.

See: List of phenyltropanes (Many phenyltropanes are derived from cocaine metabolites, such as methylecgonidine, as precursors. Whereas fully synthetic methods have been devised from the starting material of vinylcarbenoids & pyrroles.)

The difference in the length of the benzoyloxy and the phenyl linkage contrasted between cocaine and phenyltropanes makes for a shorter distance between the centroid of the aromatic benzene and the bridge nitrogen of the tropane in the latter PTs. This distance being on a scale of 5.6 Å for phenyltropanes and 7.7 Å for cocaine or analogs with the benzoyloxy intact. (Note: ←Page #970 (46th page of article) §B, 10th line) This may account for PTs increased behavioral stimulation profile over cocaine. (Note: ←Page #971 (47th page of article) 1st ¶, 10th line) Differences in binding potency have also been explained considering solvation effects; cocaine containing 2β,3β-ester groups being calculated as more solvated than the WIN-type compounds (i.e. troparil). Higher pK_{ɑ}s of the tropane nitrogen (8.65 for cocaine, 9.55 for troparil & 11.95 for vinyl analogue 43a), decreased aqueous solvation & decreased conformational flexibility added to increased binding affinity. (Note: ←Page #949 (25th page of article) 3rd ¶, 20th line)

Despite the observation of increased stimulation, phenyltropanes lack the local anesthetic sodium channel blocking effect that the benzoyloxy imparts to cocaine. Beside topical affect, this gives cocaine an affinity for binding to sites on the dopamine and serotonin sodium dependent transport areas that are distinct & specific to MAT in contrast to the general sodium channels; creating a separate mechanism of relational affinity to the transporters in addition to its inhibition of the reuptake for those transporters; this is unique to the local anesthetic value in cocaine & analogues with a similar substitute for the benzoyloxy that leaves the sodium channel blockage ability intact. Rendering such compounds as different functionally in their relation to MAT contrasted to phenyltropane analogues which have the local anesthetic bridge removed. (Requiring some of the sodium ions to be pumped from the axon via Na+/K+-ATPase). In addition, it even has been postulated that a crucial role regarding the electron energy imparted via voltage sensitization (and thus action potential blockage with a molecule capable of intersecting its specific channel, in the case of cocaine a sodium channel, that potentially serves in re-quantifying its charge) upon a receptor binding site may attenuate the mediating influence of the inhibitory regulation that autoreceptors play by their slowing neurotransmitter release when an efflux is created through an instance of agonism by a compound; allowing said efflux to be continued without the body's attempt to maintain homeostasis enacting in as readily responsive a manner to its conformational change.

Various phenyltropane examples

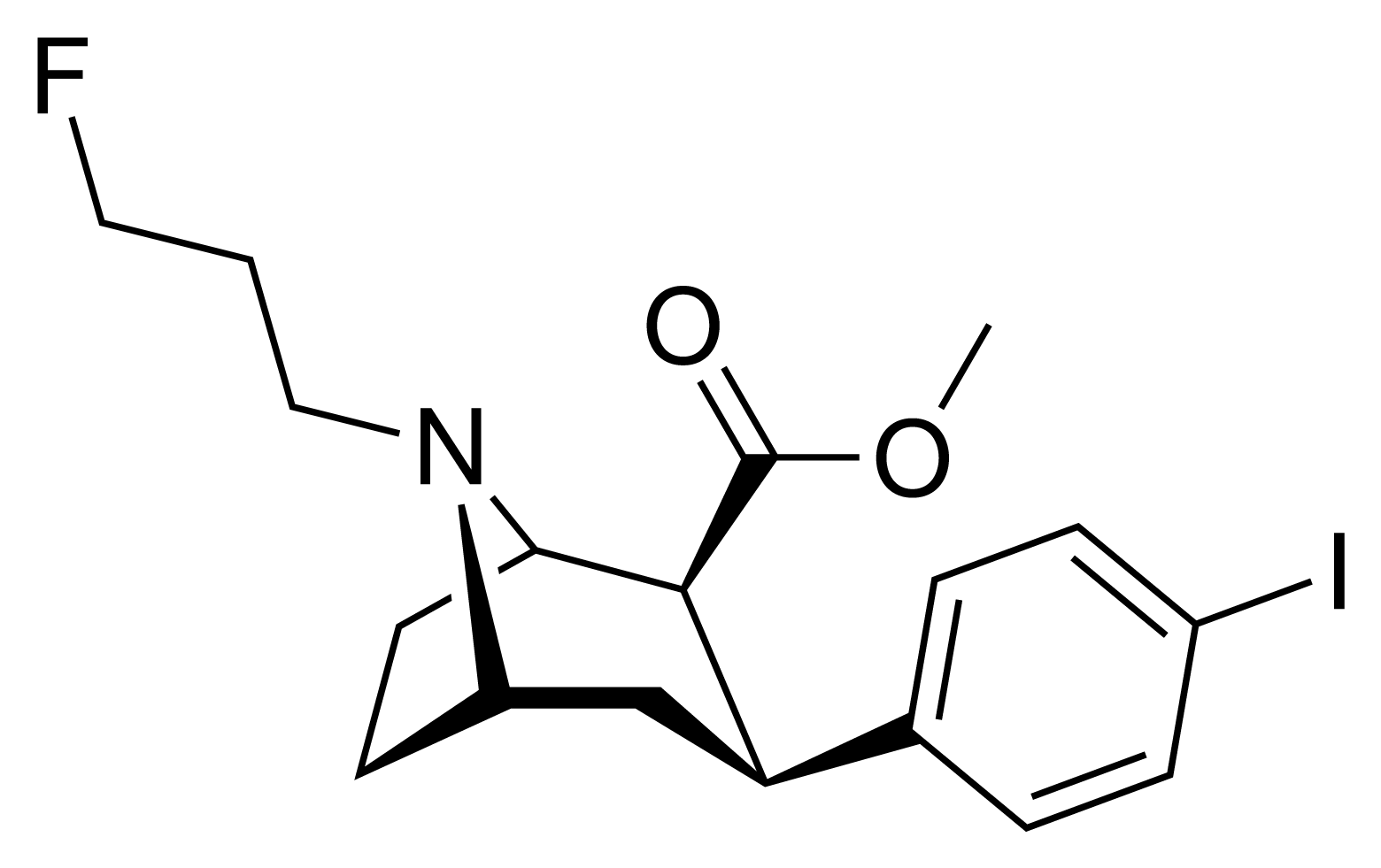
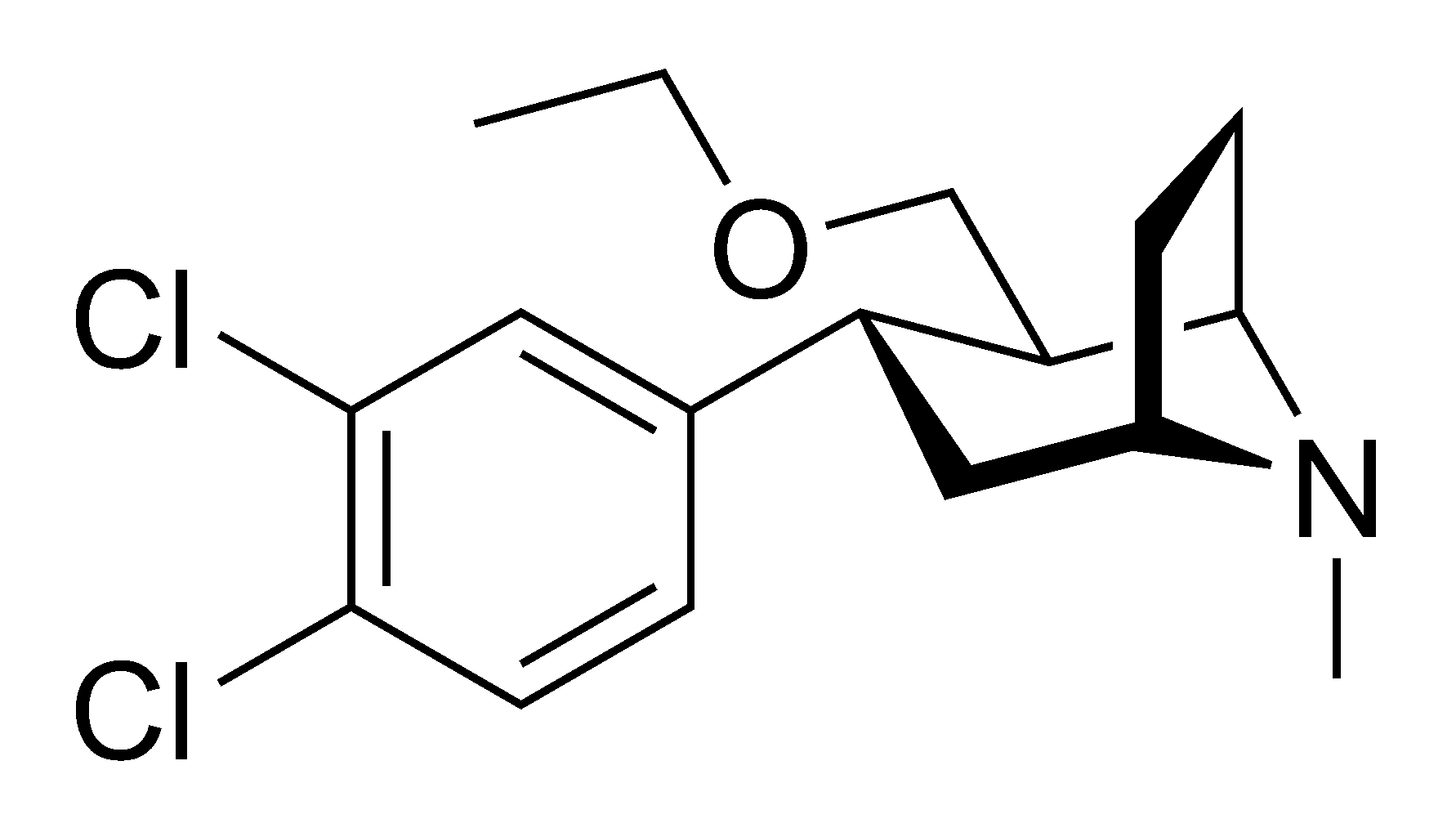

=== 3β-Alkylphenyltropane & 3β-Alkenyl analogues ===
3-position alkylphenyl linkage substituting benzoyloxy analogues (Note: ←Page #982 (58th page of article) §F, Table 34 & Figure 35.)
Compound	S. Singh's alphanumeric assignation (name)	n	IC_{50} (nM) [^{3}H]Cocaine binding	IC_{50} (nM) [^{3}H]DA uptake	Selectivity uptake/binding
	(Cocaine)		101 ± 26	209 ± 20	2.1
	224a	_{1}	885 ± 18	1020 ± 52	1.1
	224b	_{2}	9.9 ± 0.33	70.5 ± 1.0	7.1
	224c	_{3}	344 ± 12	2680 ± 190	7.8
	224d		71.6 ± 0.7	138 ± 9	1.9
	224e		2.10 ± 0.04	5.88 ± 0.09	2.8

3β-Alkylphenyltropane & 3β-Alkenyl analogues
224a	224b	224c	224d	224e

The compound 224e, the 3β-styrene analogue, had the highest potency in its group. While 224b & 224c showed the most selectivity, with 224b having a ten-fold greater potency for the dopamine transporter than cocaine. (Note: ←Page #982 (58th page of article) 3rd ¶, lines 2, 5 & 6.)

=== 6-Alkyl-3-benzyltropane analogues ===
6-Alkyl-3-benzyl-2[(methoxycarbonyl)methyl]tropane analogues (Note: ←Page #984 (60th page of article) Figure 37.)
Sub-category (S. Singh compound #)	a R=H	b R=Me	c R=Et	d R=n-Pr	e R=n-Bu	f R=Bn
2β,6α-isomers: (229a—f)
2α,6α-isomers: (230a—f)
2β,6β-isomers: (231a—f)
2α,6β-isomers: (232a—f)

6-Alkyl-3-benzyl-2[(methoxycarbonyl)methyl]tropane analogues (Note: ←Page #984 (60th page of article) §H, Figure 37 & Page #985 (61st page of article) Table 36.)
Compound	S. Singh's alphanumeric assignation (name/WIN number)	R	K_{i} (nM) [^{3}H]WIN 35428 binding	IC_{50} (nM) [^{3}H]DA uptake	Selectivity uptake/binding
	Cocaine		32 ± 5; 338 ± 221	405 ± 91; 405 ± 91	12.6; 1.2
	WIN 35065-2		33 ± 17; 314 ± 222	373 ± 10	11.3
	(−)-229a	H	33 ± 5	161 ± 100	4.9
	229a	H	91 ± 10	94 ± 26	1.0
	229b	Me	211 ± 23	-	-
	229c	Et	307 ± 28	-	-
	229d	n-Pr	4180 ± 418	-	-
	229e	n-Bu	8580 ± 249	-	-
	229f	Bn	3080 ± 277	-	-
	(+)-230a	H	60 ± 6	208 ± 63	3.5
	230a	H	108 ± 14	457 ± 104	4.2
	230b	Me	561 ± 64	-	-
	230c	Et	1150 ± 135	-	-
	230d	n-Pr	7240 ± 376	-	-
	230e	n-Bu	19700 ± 350	-	-
	230f	Bn	7590 ± 53	-	-
	231b	Me	57 ± 5	107 ± 36	1.9
	231c	Et	3110 ± 187	-	-
	231d	n-Pr	5850 ± 702	-	-
	231f	Bn	1560 ± 63	-	-
	232b	Me	294 ± 29	532 ± 136	1.8
	232c	Et	6210 ± 435	-	-
	232d	n-Pr	57300 ± 3440	-	-
	232f	Bn	3080 ± 277	-	-
	241	Bn	4830 ± 434	-	-

Benzylidene derivatives of 6-alkyl-3-benzyltropanes (Note: ←Page #984 (60th page of article) Scheme 56.)
Sub-category (S. Singh compound #)	a R=H	b R=Me	c R=Et	d R=n-Pr	e R=n-Bu	f R=Bn
6α-isomers: (237a—f)
6β-isomers (exo): (238a—f)
3β-benzyl derivatives: (239a—f)
intermediate alkylidene esters: (240a—f)

N.B. The benzylidene derivatives serve as synthetic intermediates for 6-Alkyl-3-benzyltropanes and have not been assayed for biological activity. Compounds 237a and 238a are the same compound as both are the parent for either series with a hydrogen saturated in their respective substitution place.

=== Direct 2,3-pyrimidino fused ===
above: Strobamine, a DARI functional cocaine analog with structural semblance. Compare the phenyltropane length tropane C2 & C3 functional group fusion variant.

below: Chalcostrobamine

cf. strobamine (at right) for a more efficacious compound as like the below.

2,3-direct fused "di-hetero-benzene" rigidified cocaine analogs. (Binding values @ biogenic amine transporters (BATs) for rigid and semi-rigid analogs)
Structure	alphanumeric assignation	R_{1}	R_{2}	hDAT IC_{50} (nM)	hSERT IC_{50} (nM)	hNET IC_{50} (nM)
	(−)-3a	H	C_{6}H_{5}	58,300 (20,200)	6140 (3350)	NA
	(+)-3a	H	C_{6}H_{5}	48,700 (20,100)	6030 (3400)	NA
	(−)-3b	H	NH_{2}	NA	NA	NA
	(+)-3b	H	NH_{2}	NA	NA	NA
	(−)-3c	H	CH_{3}	NA	NA	NA
	(+)-3c	H	CH_{3}	NA	NA	NA
	(−)-3d	H	H	NA	NA	NA
	(+)-3d	H	H	NA	NA	NA
	(+/—)-3e	C_{6}H_{5}	C_{6}H_{5}	30,000 (11,200)	3650 (1700)	NA

- "NA" = "no affinity", e.g. unquantifiable.

Direct di-hetero-benzene (pyrimidino) 2,3-fused and thus rigidified cocaine analogs.

=== Piperidine cocaine-homologues ===
Tricyclo benzoyloxy dibenzene cocaine analogue. cf. benztropine compound #277, tropatepine, etc.

Binding potency of piperidine homologues for displacement of [^{3}H]WIN 35428 (Note: ←Page #986 (62nd page of article) §I, Table 37 & Scheme 58)
Compound	S. Singh's alphanumeric assignation (name)	2β-R	IC_{50} (nM)
	(Cocaine)	CO_{2}CH_{3} (i.e. CO_{2}Me)	249 ± 37
	183a	CO_{2}CH_{3}	2522 ± 4
	242	H	11589 ± 4
	243	CO_{2}CH_{3}	8064 ± 4

cf. phenyltropane piperidine-homologues for compounds with a more optimized conformation that yield higher affinities when binding to MAT.

=== Cocaine hapten analogues ===
"GNC", a cocaine analog designed to minimize the formation of noncocaine-like structures through its chemical coupling to the Ad proteins; all while maintaining the element of its antigenic determinant from the moiety of cocaine.

Cocaine analogs which elicit noncatalytic antibodies (Note: ←Page #1,014 (90th page of article) §VIII, A. Figure 59.)
Compound	S. Singh's alphanumeric assignation (name)	2β-R
	394 (GNC)^{ɑ}	CO_{2}(CH_{2})_{5}CO_{2}H
	395 (Succinyl Norcocaine)	CO_{2}CH_{3}
	GNE^{b} including carrier proteins: GNE-FLiC; GNE-KLH; GNE-BSA	
	396	CONH(CH_{2})_{5}CO_{2}H

- ^{ɑ}6-(2R,3S)-3-(benzoyloxy)-8-methyl-8-azabicyclo [3.2.1] octane-2-carbonyloxy-hexanoic acid
- ^{b}6-(2R,3S)-3-(benzoyloxy)-8-methyl-8-azabicyclo [3.2.1] octane-2-carboxamido-hexanoic acid

Tetrahedral-intermediate cocaine-hapten compound #400

Cocaine transition state analogues (TSAs) which generate catalytic antibodies (Note: ←Page #1,016 (92nd page of article) Figure 60.)
Compound	S. Singh's alphanumeric assignation (name)	R
	401a	CH_{3}
	401b	(CH_{2})_{5}CO_{2}H
	401c	CH_{2}CO_{2}H
	401d	COCH_{2}CH_{2}CO_{2}H
	401e	H
	401f	CH_{2}CH_{2}Br
	385g	(CH_{2})_{2}NHCO(CH_{2})_{2}CONH_{2}
	402a	O(CH_{2})_{4}NHCO(CH_{2})_{2}CO_{2}N(CO_{2})_{2}C_{6}H_{4}
	402b	OH
	402c	O(CH_{2})_{2}(p-NH_{2}C_{6}H_{4})
	402d	NH(CH_{2})_{5}CO_{2}H
	402e	O(CH_{2})_{4}NHCO(CH_{2})_{2}CONH_{2}
	403a	NH_{2}
	403b	NHCOCH_{2}Br
	403c	NHCO(CH_{2})_{3}CO_{2}H
	403d	(CH_{2})_{3}NHCO(CH_{2})_{2}CONH_{2}

Cocaine haptens that create catalytic anti-bodies require transitional states as affected in vivo. Monoclonal antibodies generated against BSA-coupled 402e accelerated the rate of cocaine hydrolysis by ~23,000x and eliminated the reinforcing effects of cocaine administration in rats.

Anti-idiotypic & butyl-cholinesterase mediated immunopharmacotherapy cocaine analogs
K1-KLH/BSA	K2-KLH/BSA

== Structural/Functional intermediate analogues ==
=== Piperidine Analogues ===
- JZ-IV-10 (a "Modafinil hybrid" with nocaine. cf. List of modafinil analogues)

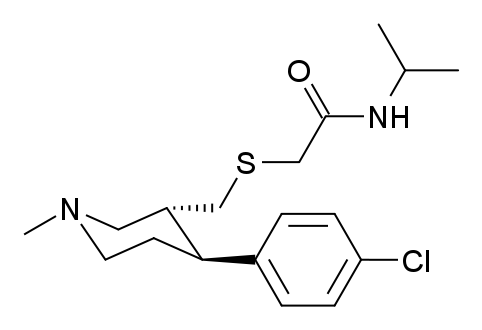

- Nocaine

=== Benztropine (3α-Diphenylmethoxy Tropane) Analogues ===
3α-Diphenylmethoxy tropanes (Benztropine analog affinities binding to DAT & DA uptake) (Note: ←Page #987 (63rd page of article) §IV, Figure 39 & Page #988 (64th page of article) Table 38.)
Compound	S. Singh's alphanumeric assignation (name)	R	R′	K_{i} (nM) [^{3}H]WIN 35428 binding	IC_{50} (nM) [^{3}H]DA uptake	Selectivity uptake/binding
	(Cocaine)			388 ± 47	-	-
	(GBR 12909)			11.6 ± 31	-	-
	(Benztropine)	H	H	118 ± 9	403 ± 115	3.4
	249a	4′-F	H	32.2 ± 10	48	1.5
	249b (AHN 1-055)	4′-F	4′-F	11.8 ± 1	71	6.0
	249c	3′,4′-di-F	H	27.9 ± 11	181 ± 45.7	6.5
	249d	4′-Cl	H	30.0 ± 12	115	3.8
	249e	4′-Cl	4′-Cl	20.0 ± 14	75	3.8
	249f	3′,4′-di-Cl	H	21.1 ± 19	47	2.2
	249g	3′,4′-di-Cl	F	18.9 ± 14	24	1.3
	249h	4′-Br	H	37.9 ± 7	29	0.8
	249i	4′-Br	4′-Br	91.6	34	0.4
	249j	4′-NO_{2}	H	197 ± 8	219	1.1
	249k	4′-CN	H	196 ± 9	222	1.1
	249l	4′-CF_{3}	H	635 ± 10	2155	3.4
	249m	4′-OH	H	297 ± 13	677	2.3
	249n	4′-OMe	H	78.4 ± 8	468	6.0
	249o	4′-OMe	4′-OMe	2000 ± 7	2876	1.4
	249p	4′-Me	H	187 ± 5	512	2.7
	249q	4′-Me	4′-Me	420 ± 7	2536	6.0
	249r	4′-Et	H	520 ± 8	984	1.9
	249s	4′-t-Bu	H	1918	4456	2.3
	250a	3′-F	H	68.5 ± 12	250 ± 64.7	3.6
	250b	3′-F	3′-F	47.4 ± 1	407 ± 63.9	8.6
	250c	3′-Cl	H	21.6 ± 7	228 ± 77.1	10.5
	250d	3′-CF_{3}	H	187 ± 5	457 ± 72.0	2.4
	251a	2′-F	H	50.0 ± 12	140 ± 17.2	2.8
	251b	2′-Cl	H	228 ± 9	997 ± 109	4.4
	251c	2′-Me	H	309 ± 6	1200 ± 1.64	3.9
	251d	2′-NH_{2}	H	840 ± 8	373 ± 117	0.4

3α-Diphenylmethoxy-2β-carbomethoxybenztropine (Benztropine affinities to DAT & 5-HTT in cynomologous monkey caudate-putamen) (Note: ←Page #987 (63rd page of article) Figure 40, Page #988 (64th page of article) §B & Page #989 (65th page of article) Table 39.)
Compound	S. Singh's alphanumeric assignation (name)	R	R′	IC_{50} (nM) DAT (Binding of [^{3}H]WIN 35428)	IC_{50} (nM) 5-HTT (Binding of [^{3}H]Citalopram)	Selectivity 5-HTT/DAT
	(benztropine)			312 ± 1.1	24100 ± 14800	77.2
	(WIN 35428)			12.9 ± 1.1	160 ± 20	12.4
	R-256			2040 ± 283	1460 ± 255	0.7
	S-257a	H	H	33.5 ± 4.5	10100 ± 1740	301
	S-257b	H	F	13.2 ± 1.9	4930 ± 1200	373
	S-257c (difluoropine)	F	F	10.9 ± 1.2	3530 ± 1480	324
	S-257d	H	Cl	15.8 ± 0.95	5960 ± 467	377
	S-257e	Cl	Cl	91.4 ± 0.85	3360 ± 1480	36.8
	S-257f	H	Br	24.0 ± 4.6	5770 ± 493	240
	S-257g	Br	Br	72.0 ± 3.65	2430 ± 339	33.7
	S-257h	H	I	55.9 ± 10.3	9280 ± 1640	166
	S-257i	Br	I	389 ± 29.4	4930 ± 82	12.7
	S-257j	I	I	909 ± 79	8550 ± 442	9.4
	S-257k	H	Me	49.5 ± 6.0	13200	266
	S-257l	Me	Me	240 ± 18.4	9800 ± 2680	40.8

N-Modified 2-carbomethoxybenztropines (Benztropine affinities to DAT & 5-HTT in cynomologous monkey caudate-putamen) (Note: ←Page #987 (63rd page of article) Figure 41, Page #989 (65th page of article) §C & Page #990 (66th page of article) Table 40.)
Compound	S. Singh's alphanumeric assignation (name)	R	n	IC_{50} (nM) DAT (Binding of [^{3}H]WIN 35428)	IC_{50} (nM) 5-HTT (Binding of [^{3}H]Citalopram)	Selectivity 5-HTT/DAT
	258a			20.3 ± 3.5	-	-
	258b	H	_{1}	223 ± 53	4970 ± 700	22.3
	258c	H	_{3}	22.0 ± 11.9	19.7 ± 3	0.9
	258d	Br	_{3}	80.2 ± 8.8	234 ± 0.5	2.9
	258e	I	_{3}	119 ± 11	2200 ± 1250	18.5
	258f	H	_{5}	99.0 ± 28	550 ± 63	5.5
	259			616 ± 88	55200 ± 20000	89.3

N-substituted 3α[bis(4′-fluorophenyl)methoxy]tropanes (Benztropine affinities to DAT & 5-HTT) (Note: ←Page #988 (64th page of article) Figure 42, Page #990 (66th page of article) §2 & Page #992 (68th page of article) Table 41.)
Compound	S. Singh's alphanumeric assignation (name)	R	K_{i} (nM) DAT (Binding of [^{3}H]WIN 35428)	IC_{50} (nM) 5-HTT (Uptake of [^{3}H]DA)	Selectivity uptake/binding
	260 (AHN 2-003)	H	11.2 ± 11	9.7	0.9
	261a	3-phenylpropyl	41.9 ± 11	230	5.5
	261b	indole-3-ethyl	44.6 ± 11	1200	26.9
	261c	4-phenylbutyl	8.51 ± 14	39	4.6
	261d	4-(4′-nitrophenyl)butyl	20.2 ± 11	650	32.2
	261e	3-(4′-fluorophenyl)propyl	60.7 ± 12	-	-
	262a	n-butyl	24.6 ± 8	370	15.0
	262b	cyclopropylmethyl	32.4 ± 9	180	5.5
	262c	allyl	29.9 ± 10	14	0.5
	262d	benzyl	82.2 ± 15	290	3.5
	262e	4-fluorobenzyl	95.6 ± 10	200	2.1
	262f	cinnanyl	86.4 ± 12	180	2.1
	262g	[bis(4-fluorophenyl)methoxy]ethyl	634 ± 23	-	-
	262h	[(4-nitrophenyl)phenylmethoxy]ethyl	57.0 ± 17	-	-
	263	acetyl	2340	4600	2.0
	264	formyl	2020 ± 13	5400	2.7
	265a	tosyl	0%^{ɑ}	-	-
	265b	mesyl	18%^{ɑ}	-	-
	(AHN 2-005)	CH_{2}CH=CH_{2}	-	-	-
	(JHW 007)	CH_{2}CH_{2}CH_{2}CH_{3}	-	-	-
	(GA 2-99)	CH_{2}CH_{2}NH_{2}	-	-	-
	(GA 103)	CH_{2}CH_{2}CH_{2}CH_{2}Ph	-	-	-
	266		108 ± 12	130	1.2

^{ɑ}Inhibition at 10 μM

8-Oxa-2-carbomethoxy norbenztropines (8-Oxanortropane benztropine analog affinities to DAT & 5-HTT) (Note: ←Page #988 (64th page of article) Figure 43, Page #992 (68th page of article) §3 & Table 42.)
Compound	S. Singh's alphanumeric assignation (name)		IC_{50} (nM) DAT (Binding of [^{3}H]WIN 35428)	IC_{50} (nM) 5-HTT (Binding of [^{3}H]Citalopram)
	R/S-268	2β,3β	>10000	>1660
	R/S-269	2α,3β	20300	>1660
	R/S-270	2α,3α	22300	>1660
	R/S-271	2β,3α	520	>1660

3α-Diphenylmethoxytropane Analogues of Cocaine
Benzatropine	Etybenzatropine	Difluoropine (O-620)	PG01053	276	277
Benzatropine	Etybenzatropine	Difluoropine is a stimulant drug which acts as a more selective dopamine reuptake inhibitor than cocaine.	PG01053	Compound 276	Compound 277
MFZ 4-86	MFZ 2-71	3-CPMT	JHW 007-d9	GA 103	AHN 1-055
		3-CPMT	Deuterium labeled radio-ligand of benztropine analog JHW-007; a di-para-fluoro benztropine, and hybrid between benzatropine & difluoropine (with fluorine groups in the former to breach the difference or the latter being descarbmethoxy to approach identification with the former)	N-phenylpropyl bis-4-fluorobenztropine.	The 4′,4′-bisfluorinated analogue of benztropine.

The binding of benztropine analogues to the DAT differs significantly from that of cocaine and the phenyltropanes. Benztropines are considered to be "atypical" DAT ligands because they stabilize the DAT in an inward-facing (closed-to-out) conformation, whereas cocaine and the phenyltropanes stabilize the DAT in an outward-facing (open-to-out) conformation. This difference in DAT binding may be responsible for the lack of cocaine-like behavioral effects observed in animal and human studies of the benztropine analogues and other “atypical” DAT inhibitors. Studies of the structure-activity relationships of benztropine have shown that DAT affinity and selectivity over other monoamine transporters is enhanced by 4′,4′-difluorination. Modification of the tropane n-substituent was found to mitigate the anticholinergic effects of benztropine analogues by reducing M1 affinity.

=== Tropanyl Isoxazoline Analogues ===
Tropanyl-Δ^{2}-isoxazoline derivatives
4a	4c	5a	5c
6a	6b	6c	7a
7b	7c	8a	8b
8c	9a	9b	9c
10a	10b	10c	11a
11b	12a	12b	

Compound 7a (3′-methoxy-8-methyl-spiro(8-azabicyclo(3.2.1)octane-3,5′(4′H)-isoxazole) allosterically enhances SERT binding of other reuptake ligands. Compound 7a construed as a potentiating allosteric effect (by unveiling occluded configured serotonin uptake-area ligand-site on surface of transporter that allows for binding by exogenous ligand, when SERT is otherwise conformed in a transitional manner where a SERT ligand cannot bind, this effect with compound in question occurs) at concentrations of 10μM—30μM (wherein it acts by interconverting the conformational state of unexposed SERTs to ones exposing the SSRI binding site via a shift to the equilibrium of the MAT) while exerting an inhibitory orthosteric effect when concentrations reach >30μM and above.

7a is the only known compound to allosterically modulate SERT in such a way within in vitro conditions (tianeptine has been shown to do similar, but has only shown efficacy doing so in living in vivo tissue samples). Considering its noncompetitive inhibition of 5-HT transporters decreasing V_{max} with small change in the Km for serotonin, putatively stabilizing the cytoplasm-facing conformation of SERT: in such respect it is considered to have the opposite effect profile of the anti-addiction drug ibogaine (save for the function by which its anti-addictive properties are thought to be mediated, i.e. α_{3}β_{4} nicotinic channel blockage. cf. 18-Methoxycornaridine for such nicotinergic activity without the likewise SERT affinity).

Compound 11a possesses similar effects, but acts on the DAT. Similarly, such peripheral DAT considerations (when, as often is, considered conformational rather than otherwise explained as being electrostatic) may constitute the difference in affinity, through allosertic occulsion, between cyclopentyl-ruthenium phenyltropane in its difference from the tricarbonyl-chromium

=== Alicyclic Amine Analogues ===
EXP-561	Butyltolylquinuclidine

=== Dihydroimidazoles ===
Possible substitutions of the Mazindol molecular structure.

Mazindol is usually considered a non-habituating (in humans, and some other mammals, but is habituating for e.g. Beagles (Note: ←Page #1,011 (87th page of article) §VII (7) 1st ¶.)) tetracyclic dopamine reuptake inhibitor (of somewhat spurious classification in the former).

It is a loosely functional analog used in cocaine research; due in large part to N-Ethylmaleimide being able to inhibit approximately 95% of the specific binding of [^{3}H]Mazindol to the residues of the MAT binding site(s), however said effect of 10 mM N-Ethylmaleimide was prevented in its entirety by just 10 μM cocaine. Whereas neither 300 μM dopamine or D-amphetamine afforded sufficient protection to contrast the efficacy of cocaine. (Note: ←Page #969 (45th page of article) 2nd (right-side) column 2nd ¶.)

== Local anesthetics (not usually CNS stimulants) ==
Amylocaine, or Stovaine (above), the first synthetically constructed local anesthetic. Compare structure to dimethylaminopivalophenone (below), an analgesic (opioid). Cocaine's classification as a narcotic under U.S. legal code, as has been stretched to be medicinally rationalized such when defining terms very broadly (due to its topical numbing affect, hindering pain signals from CNS recognition via local anesthesia) usually considered an exaggeration of traditional medicine naming convention, in this instance between the first synthetic sodium channel blocker and one of the very simplest opioids there remains a measure of apparent structural similarity between the former anesthetic and latter analgesic "narcotic"; despite the highly differing methods of action for the respective 'pain-killing' properties of either.

In animal studies, certain of the local anesthetics have displayed residual dopamine reuptake inhibitor properties, although not normally ones that are easily available. These are expected to be more cardiotoxic than phenyltropanes. For example, dimethocaine has behavioral stimulant effects (and therefore not here listed below) if a dose of it is taken that is 10 times the amount of cocaine. Dimethocaine is equipotent to cocaine in terms of its anesthetic equivalency. Intralipid "rescue" has been shown to reverse the cardiotoxic effects of sodium channel blockers and presumably those effects when from cocaine administered intravenously as well.

List of local anesthetics
Name	Other common names
Amylocaine	Stovaine
Articaine	Astracaine, Carticaine, Septanest, Septocaine, Ultracaine, Zorcaine
Benzocaine	Anbesol, Lanacane, Orajel
Bupivacaine	Marcaine, Sensorcaine, Vivacaine
Butacaine	Butyn
Chloroprocaine	Nesacaine
Cinchocaine/Dibucaine	Cincain, Cinchocaine, Nupercainal, Nupercaine, Sovcaine
Cyclomethycaine	Surfacaine, Topocaine
Etidocaine	Duranest
Eucaine	α-eucaine, β-eucaine
Fomocaine	
Fotocaine	
Hexylcaine	Cyclaine, Osmocaine
Levobupivacaine	Chirocaine
Lidocaine/Lignocaine	Xylocaine, Betacaine
Mepivacaine	Carbocaine, Polocaine
Meprylcaine/Oracaine	Epirocain
Metabutoxycaine	Primacaine
Phenacaine/Holocaine	Holocaine
Piperocaine	Metycaine
Pramocaine/Pramoxine	Pramoxine
Prilocaine	Citanest
Propoxycaine/Ravocaine	Pravocaine, Ranocaine, Blockain
Procaine/Novocaine	Borocaine (Procaine Borate), Ethocaine
Proparacaine/Alcaine	Alcaine
Quinisocaine	Dimethisoquin
Risocaine	Propaesin, Propazyl, Propylcain
Ropivacaine	Naropin
Tetracaine/Amethocaine	Pontocaine, Dicaine
Trimecaine	Mesdicain, Mesocain, Mesokain

== See also ==
Methylecgonine cinnamate, an alkaloid widely considered inactive in its own right, but postulated to be active under pyrolysis. (cf. alkylphenyltropane analogue "224e") It is, however, found in patents of active cocaine analogue structures.

- Coca alkaloids, the ones relating to cocaine biosynthesis include: benzoylecgonine, ecgonidine, ecgonine, hydroxytropacocaine, methylecgonine cinnamate, tropacocaine & truxilline
- Cocaine metabolites (Human), which include: benzoylecgonine (BE), ecgonine methyl ester (EME), ecgonine, norcocaine, p-hydroxycocaine, m-hydroxycocaine, p-hydroxybenzoylecgonine (pOHBE) & m-hydroxybenzoylecgonine
- Dopaminergics
- List of modafinil analogues and derivatives
- Federal Analog Act
- Pharmacophore
- Pharmacopoeia
- Pharmacokinetics
- Pharmacodynamics

Common analogues to prototypical D-RAs:

- Substituted amphetamines
- Substituted cathinones
- Substituted phenethylamines
- Substituted phenylmorpholines
- Substituted methylenedioxyphenethylamines
