= C18H23NO6 =

The molecular formula C_{18}H_{23}NO_{6} (molar mass: 349.38 g/mol, exact mass: 349.1525 u) may refer to:

- Iprocrolol
- Methylvanillylecgonine
- Riddelliine
- Tazopsine
