= Benzoylthiomethylecgonine =

Names
- IUPAC name Methyl 3β-(benzoylsulfanyl)tropane-2β-carboxylate
- Systematic IUPAC name Methyl (1R,2S,3S,5S)-3-(Benzoylsulfanyl)-8-methyl-8-azabicyclo[3.2.1]octane-2-carboxylate

Identifiers
CAS Number	287488-21-5
3D model (JSmol)	Interactive image
ChemSpider	26286895
PubChem CID	101171127
UNII	BM47EQ4LCD
CompTox Dashboard (EPA)	DTXSID901029872
- InChI: InChI=1S/C17H21NO3S/c1-18-12-8-9-13(18)15(16(19)21-2)14(10-12)22-17(20)11-6-4-3-5-7-11/h3-7,12-15H,8-10H2,1-2H3/t12-,13+,14-,15+/m0/s1 Key: PKDHUFYOPRGLEU-LJISPDSOSA-N; InChI=1/C17H21NO3S/c1-18-12-8-9-13(18)15(16(19)21-2)14(10-12)22-17(20)11-6-4-3-5-7-11/h3-7,12-15H,8-10H2,1-2H3/t12-,13+,14-,15+/m0/s1 Key: PKDHUFYOPRGLEU-LJISPDSOBR
- SMILES: CN1[C@H]2CC[C@@H]1[C@H]([C@H](C2)SC(=O)c3ccccc3)C(=O)OC

Properties
Chemical formula	C_{17}H_{21}NO_{3}S
Molar mass	319.42 g·mol^{−1}
- Except where otherwise noted, data are given for materials in their standard state (at 25 °C [77 °F], 100 kPa). Infobox references

Benzoylthiomethylecgonine is a cocaine analog which includes a sulfur in replacement of an oxygen on the single bonded benzoyl ester, resulting in lower electronegativity than the parent compound.

== See also ==
- Salicylmethylecgonine
- 2'-Acetoxycocaine
- 4'-Fluorococaine
