= Cocaine reverse ester =

Chemical compound

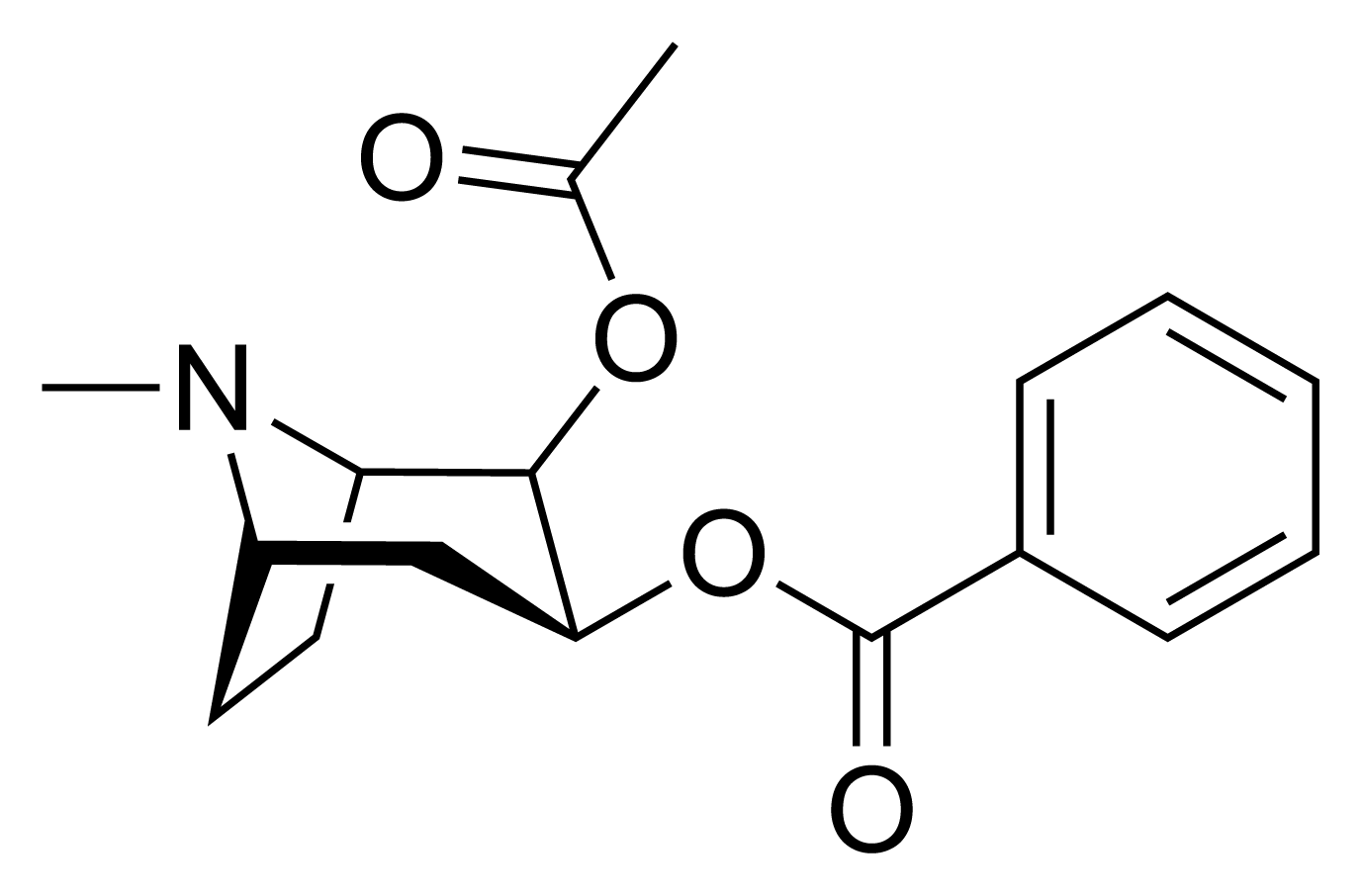

Identifiers
- IUPAC name: [(2R,3S)-2-Acetyloxy-8-methyl-8-azabicyclo[3.2.1]octan-3-yl] benzoate
- CAS Number: 33780-46-0
- PubChem CID: 9995139
- ChemSpider: 8170720

Chemical and physical data
- Formula: C_{17}H_{21}NO_{4}
- Molar mass: 303.358 g·mol^{−1}
- 3D model (JSmol): Interactive image
- SMILES: CC(=O)O[C@H]1[C@H](CC2CCC1N2C)OC(=O)C3=CC=CC=C3
- InChI: InChI=1S/C17H21NO4/c1-11(19)21-16-14-9-8-13(18(14)2)10-15(16)22-17(20)12-6-4-3-5-7-12/h3-7,13-16H,8-10H2,1-2H3/t13?,14?,15-,16+/m0/s1; Key:QAVJUWLVUKNZFV-SSHXOBKSSA-N

Cocaine reverse ester, (also known as Reverse ester cocaine or REC) is a tropane derivative drug which is a reverse ester of cocaine, with the 2-COOCH_{3} methoxycarbonyl group swapped to an isomeric OCOCH_{3} acetoxy group. It was synthesised because of the observation that the reverse ester pairs of several structurally related substances show similar activity to each other (see e.g. methylphenidate vs phacetoperane, pethidine vs desmethylprodine). Cocaine reverse ester however did not produce cocaine-like stimulant effects in animal studies, and is also illegal in many jurisdictions as a structural isomer of cocaine; nevertheless it has attracted attention from vendors of quasi-legal designer drugs as a potential alternative to cocaine.

== See also ==
- 3-(p-Fluorobenzoyloxy)tropane
- 4′-Fluorococaine
- Benzoylecgonine
- Methylecgonine cinnamate
- RTI-160
- Salicylmethylecgonine
