= C18H24N2S =

The molecular formula C_{18}H_{24}N_{2}S (molar mass: 300.462 g/mol) may refer to:

- Fourphit (4-isothiocyanato-1-[1-phenylcyclohexyl]piperidine)
- Metaphit
