= (R)-p-Isothiocyanatobenzoylecgonine methyl ester =

Names
- Preferred IUPAC name Methyl (1R,2R,3S,5S)-3-[(4-isothiocyanatobenzoyl)oxy]-8-methyl-8-azabicyclo[3.2.1]octane-2-carboxylate
- Other names p-ISOCOC, p-Isococ

Identifiers
| 3D model (JSmol) | Interactive image |
| ChemSpider | 26286894 |
| PubChem CID | 71308129 |
| CompTox Dashboard (EPA) | DTXSID001029875 |
- InChI: InChI=1S/C18H20N2O4S/c1-20-13-7-8-14(20)16(18(22)23-2)15(9-13)24-17(21)11-3-5-12(6-4-11)19-10-25/h3-6,13-16H,7-9H2,1-2H3/t13-,14+,15-,16+/m0/s1 Key: JZGFOMFCWSMVHI-XUWVNRHRSA-N; InChI=1/C18H20N2O4S/c1-20-13-7-8-14(20)16(18(22)23-2)15(9-13)24-17(21)11-3-5-12(6-4-11)19-10-25/h3-6,13-16H,7-9H2,1-2H3/t13-,14+,15-,16+/m0/s1 Key: JZGFOMFCWSMVHI-XUWVNRHRBQ
- SMILES: CN1[C@H]2CC[C@@H]1[C@H]([C@H](C2)OC(=O)c3ccc(cc3)N=C=S)C(=O)OC

Properties
| Chemical formula | C_{18}H_{20}N_{2}O_{4}S |
| Molar mass | 360.427 |
- Except where otherwise noted, data are given for materials in their standard state (at 25 °C [77 °F], 100 kPa). verify (what is ?) Infobox references

(R)-p-Isothiocyanatobenzoylecgonine methyl ester (p-ISOCOC) is a cocaine analogue and irreversible (covalent) binding inhibitor of the cocaine receptor, as well as irreversible blocker of dopamine uptake by DAT (the latter being unlike its C3 homologue m-Isococ). p-Isococ also blocks the high-affinity cocaine site in preference to the low-affinity site.

== See also ==
- RTI-76, covalent binding phenyltropane
- 4'-Fluorococaine
- Fourphit
- Metaphit
- Methocinnamox
