= RTI-160 =

Chemical compound

Identifiers
- IUPAC name: [(2R,3S)-2-(Dimethylcarbamoyl)-8-methyl-8-azabicyclo[3.2.1]octan-3-yl] benzoate
- CAS Number: 155748-85-9
- PubChem CID: 44386037
- ChemSpider: 24659148
- ChEMBL: ChEMBL612015

Chemical and physical data
- Formula: C_{18}H_{24}N_{2}O_{3}
- Molar mass: 316.401 g·mol^{−1}
- 3D model (JSmol): Interactive image
- SMILES: CN1C2CCC1[C@H]([C@H](C2)OC(=O)C3=CC=CC=C3)C(=O)N(C)C
- InChI: InChI=1S/C18H24N2O3/c1-19(2)17(21)16-14-10-9-13(20(14)3)11-15(16)23-18(22)12-7-5-4-6-8-12/h4-8,13-16H,9-11H2,1-3H3/t13?,14?,15-,16+/m0/s1; Key:KCJKRDUKFUVPDP-SSHXOBKSSA-N

RTI-160 (benzoylecgonine dimethylamide) is a tropane derivative drug with stimulant effects, having similar potency as a dopamine reuptake inhibitor to cocaine. It is synthesized by an amide condensation reaction between benzoylecgonine and dimethylamine.

== See also ==
- 3-(p-Fluorobenzoyloxy)tropane
- 4′-Fluorococaine
- Cocaethylene
- Cocaine reverse ester
- RTI-229
- Salicylmethylecgonine
