= Difluoropine =

Chemical compound

Clinical data
- Other names: (S)-(+)-2β-Carbomethoxy-3α-(bis(4-fluorophenyl)methoxy)tropane
- ATC code: none

Identifiers
- IUPAC name: methyl (1S,2S,3S,5R)-3-[bis(4-fluorophenyl)methoxy]-8-methyl-8-azabicyclo[3.2.1]octane-2-carboxylate
- CAS Number: 156774-35-5
- PubChem CID: 190851
- ChemSpider: 165751
- UNII: NA9FDN6R4M
- ChEMBL: ChEMBL1945126
- CompTox Dashboard (EPA): DTXSID20935527

Chemical and physical data
- Formula: C_{23}H_{25}F_{2}NO_{3}
- Molar mass: 401.454 g·mol^{−1}
- 3D model (JSmol): Interactive image
- SMILES: CN1[C@@H]2CC[C@H]1[C@@H]([C@H](C2)OC(C3=CC=C(C=C3)F)C4=CC=C(C=C4)F)C(=O)OC
- InChI: InChI=1S/C23H25F2NO3/c1-26-18-11-12-19(26)21(23(27)28-2)20(13-18)29-22(14-3-7-16(24)8-4-14)15-5-9-17(25)10-6-15/h3-10,18-22H,11-13H2,1-2H3/t18-,19+,20+,21+/m1/s1; Key:XSYGBVSQKPLETJ-ANULTFPQSA-N

Difluoropine (O-620) is a stimulant drug synthesised from tropinone, which acts as a potent and selective dopamine reuptake inhibitor. Difluoropine is unique among the tropane-derived dopamine reuptake inhibitors in that the active stereoisomer is the (S) enantiomer rather than the (R) enantiomer, the opposite way round compared to natural cocaine. It is structurally related to benztropine and has similar anticholinergic and antihistamine effects in addition to its dopamine reuptake inhibitory action.

Difluoropine has some stimulant effects in animals, although it is significantly less powerful than many of the potent phenyltropane derived stimulant drugs such as WIN 35,428 and RTI-55. It showed promising effects in alleviating the symptoms of Parkinson's disease in an animal model of the disorder.

It is not explicitly illegal anywhere in the world as of 2008, but might be considered to be a controlled substance analogue of cocaine on the grounds of its related chemical structure, in some jurisdictions such as the United States, Canada, Australia and New Zealand.

== See also ==
- List of cocaine analogues
