= Levophacetoperane =

Stimulant drug

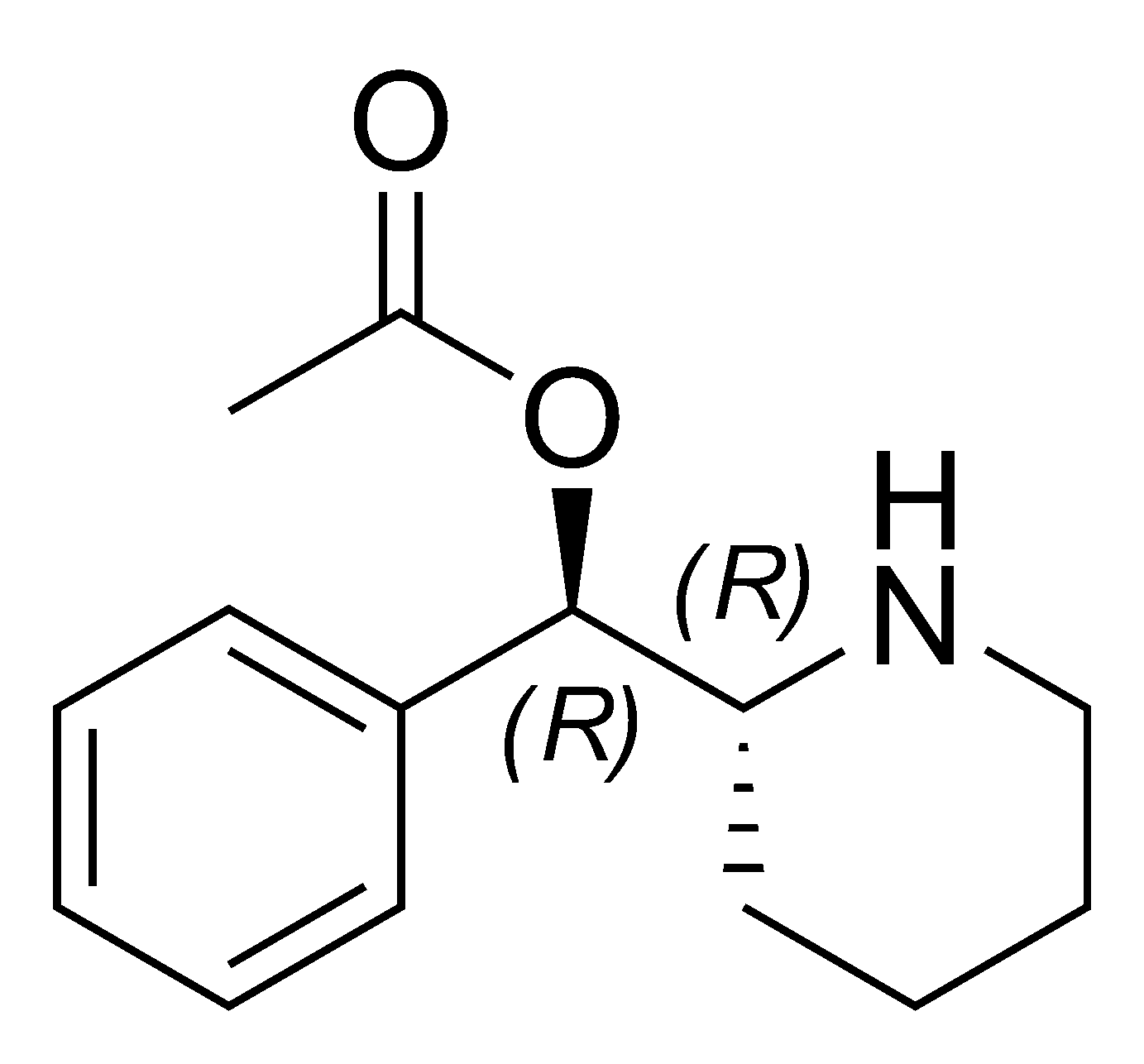

Clinical data
- Routes of administration: Oral
- ATC code: none

Legal status
- Legal status: BR: Class C1 (Other controlled substances); In general: ℞ (Prescription only)

Identifiers
- IUPAC name: [(R)-phenyl-[(2R)-piperidin-2-yl]methyl] acetate
- CAS Number: 24558-01-8
- PubChem CID: 15706387
- ChemSpider: 32702188
- UNII: 3SZ9ZII529
- CompTox Dashboard (EPA): DTXSID50179295

Chemical and physical data
- Formula: C_{14}H_{19}NO_{2}
- Molar mass: 233.311 g·mol^{−1}
- 3D model (JSmol): Interactive image
- SMILES: CC(=O)O[C@@H]([C@H]1CCCCN1)C2=CC=CC=C2
- InChI: InChI=1S/C14H19NO2/c1-11(16)17-14(12-7-3-2-4-8-12)13-9-5-6-10-15-13/h2-4,7-8,13-15H,5-6,9-10H2,1H3/t13-,14-/m1/s1; Key:BKPLVPRTTWIDNL-ZIAGYGMSSA-N

Levophacetoperane (Lidépran, Phacétoperane) is a psychostimulant developed by Rhône-Poulenc in the 1950s. The drug has been used as an antidepressant and anorectic. It is the reverse ester of methylphenidate. Phacetoperane and levophacetoperane have been used as wakefulness-promoting agents in the treatment of narcolepsy.

A precursor used in the synthesis of levophacetoperane is phenyl(piperidin-2-yl)methanol.

== See also ==
- Cocaine reverse ester
- Dexmethylphenidate
