= 3-(p-Fluorobenzoyloxy)tropane =

Chemical compound

Clinical data
- Routes of administration: insufflated

Legal status
- Legal status: DE: Anlage II (Authorized trade only, not prescriptible)

Identifiers
- IUPAC name: (1R,5S)-(8-methyl-8-azabicyclo[3.2.1]octan-3-yl) 4-fluorobenzoate
- CAS Number: 172883-97-5
- PubChem CID: 5147770
- ChemSpider: 4321292
- UNII: MQP3G94388
- CompTox Dashboard (EPA): DTXSID101023632

Chemical and physical data
- Formula: C_{15}H_{18}FNO_{2}
- Molar mass: 263.312 g·mol^{−1}
- 3D model (JSmol): Interactive image
- SMILES: CN1C2CC(OC(C3=CC=C(F)C=C3)=O)CC1CC2
- InChI: InChI=1S/C15H18FNO2/c1-17-12-6-7-13(17)9-14(8-12)19-15(18)10-2-4-11(16)5-3-10/h2-5,12-14H,6-9H2,1H3; Key:YXDFSLSXLYAAPF-UHFFFAOYSA-N

3β-(p-Fluorobenzoyloxy)tropane, (8-Methyl-8-azabicyclo[3.2.1]oct-3-yl 4-fluorobenzoic acid ester, 4-fluorotropacocaine, 3-Pseudotropyl-4-fluorobenzoate, 3-pseudotropyl-4-fluorobenzoate, pFBT) is a tropane derivative drug which acts as a local anaesthetic, having around 30% the stimulant potency of cocaine but around the same potency as a local anaesthetic. It has been investigated as a potential radiolabelled agent for studying receptor binding, but was not adopted for this application. The main application for fluorotropacocaine, however, has been as a designer drug analogue of cocaine, first detected by the EMCDDA in 2008, and subsequently sold as an ingredient of various "bath salt" powder products, usually mixed in combination with other stimulant drugs such as caffeine, dimethocaine, desoxypipradrol or substituted cathinone derivatives.

== See also ==
- Hygrine
- 4′-Fluorococaine
- RTI-160
- Tropacocaine
- List of cocaine analogues
