= Methylvanillylecgonine =

Names
- IUPAC name Methyl 3β-[(3-hydroxy-4-methoxybenzoyl)oxy]tropane-2β-carboxylate
- Systematic IUPAC name Methyl (1R,2R,3S,5S)-3-[(3-hydroxy-4-methoxybenzoyl)oxy]-8-methyl-8-azabicyclo[3.2.1]octane-2-carboxylate
- Other names Hydroxymethoxycocaine; 4′-hydroxy-3′-methoxycocaine parahydroxymetamethoxycocaine

Identifiers
CAS Number	89315-13-9
3D model (JSmol)	Interactive image
- InChI: InChI=1S/C18H23NO6/c1-19-11-5-6-12(19)16(18(22)24-3)15(9-11)25-17(21)10-4-7-13(20)14(8-10)23-2/h4,7-8,11-12,15-16,20H,5-6,9H2,1-3H3 Key: BHHXESNMOOYSOJ-UHFFFAOYSA-N
- SMILES: COc(c1)c(O)ccc1C(=O)OC2CC(CC3)N(C)C3C2C(=O)OC

Properties
Chemical formula	C_{18}H_{23}NO_{6}
Molar mass	349.383 g·mol^{−1}
- Except where otherwise noted, data are given for materials in their standard state (at 25 °C [77 °F], 100 kPa). Infobox references

Methylvanillylecgonine or vanillylmethylecgonine is a cocaine analog and metabolite of cocaine found in human urine (possibly with co-ingestion of vanillin-vanilla containing products, as a result of cleavage and binding in vivo but more probably the result of the same metabolic pathways by which vanillylmandelic acid is formed).

== See also ==
- Salicylmethylecgonine
- Cocaethylene
