= Fourphit =

Clinical data
- Other names: 4-Isothiocyanato-PCP
- Drug class: Irreversible dopamine transporter blocker; Reversible NMDA receptor antagonist; Psychostimulant antagonist

Identifiers
- IUPAC name: 4-isothiocyanato-1-(1-phenylcyclohexyl)piperidine
- CAS Number: 104639-01-2
- PubChem CID: 128615
- ChemSpider: 113988
- UNII: EP455HL5XL
- CompTox Dashboard (EPA): DTXSID10146625

Chemical and physical data
- Formula: C_{18}H_{24}N_{2}S
- Molar mass: 300.46 g·mol^{−1}
- 3D model (JSmol): Interactive image
- SMILES: C1CCC(CC1)(C2=CC=CC=C2)N3CCC(CC3)N=C=S
- InChI: InChI=1S/C18H24N2S/c21-15-19-17-9-13-20(14-10-17)18(11-5-2-6-12-18)16-7-3-1-4-8-16/h1,3-4,7-8,17H,2,5-6,9-14H2; Key:QAHYIAVTWZVTMY-UHFFFAOYSA-N

Fourphit, also known as 4-isothiocyanato-PCP, is an irreversible dopamine transporter (DAT) blocker and a reversible NMDA receptor antagonist. It blocks the binding of methylphenidate to the DAT in vitro, though apparently not in vivo. In any case, the drug reduces the stimulant-like effects of cocaine in animals, whilst producing mostly negligible behavioral effects itself. Fourphit is an acylating derivative of phencyclidine (PCP) and a positional isomer of metaphit (3-isothiocyanato-PCP).

== See also ==
- RTI-76
- p-ISOCOC
- Methocinnamox
