= Norcocaine =

Chemical compound

Clinical data
- Addiction liability: High
- ATC code: none

Legal status
- Legal status: US: Schedule II

Identifiers
- IUPAC name: methyl (1R,2R,3S,5S)-3-(benzoyloxy)-8-azabicyclo[3.2.1]octane-2-carboxylate
- CAS Number: 18717-72-1
- PubChem CID: 644007
- ChemSpider: 559083
- UNII: 3SL7BR2M1E
- ChEBI: CHEBI:178585
- CompTox Dashboard (EPA): DTXSID80912319
- ECHA InfoCard: 100.161.803

Chemical and physical data
- Formula: C_{16}H_{19}NO_{4}
- Molar mass: 289.331 g·mol^{−1}
- 3D model (JSmol): Interactive image
- SMILES: COC(=O)[C@@H]1[C@H]2CC[C@H](N2)C[C@@H]1OC(=O)C3=CC=CC=C3
- InChI: InChI=1S/C16H19NO4/c1-20-16(19)14-12-8-7-11(17-12)9-13(14)21-15(18)10-5-3-2-4-6-10/h2-6,11-14,17H,7-9H2,1H3/t11-,12+,13-,14+/m0/s1; Key:AYDBLCSLKNTEJL-RFQIPJPRSA-N

Norcocaine is a minor metabolite of cocaine. It is the only confirmed pharmacologically active metabolite of cocaine, although salicylmethylecgonine is also speculated to be an active metabolite. The local anesthetic potential of norcocaine has been shown to be higher than that of cocaine, however cocaine continues to be more widely used. Norcocaine used for research purposes is typically synthesized from cocaine. Several methods for the synthesis have been described.

== Legal status ==
The legal status of norcocaine is somewhat ambiguous. The US DEA does not list norcocaine as a controlled substance. However, some suppliers of norcocaine, like Sigma-Aldrich, consider the drug to be a Schedule II drug (same as cocaine) for the purpose of their own sales.

== Toxicity ==
The LD_{50} of norcocaine has been studied in mice. When administered by the intraperitoneal route, the LD_{50} in mice was 40 mg/kg.

== Controversy ==
Some researchers have suggested that hair drug testing for cocaine use should include testing for metabolites like norcocaine. The basis for this suggestion is the potential for external contamination of hair during testing. There is considerable debate about whether current means of washing hair samples are sufficient for removing external contamination. Some researchers state the methods are sufficient, while others state, the residual contamination may result in a false positive test. Metabolites of cocaine, like norcocaine, in addition to cocaine, should be present in samples from drug users. Authors have stated that the metabolites should be present in any samples declared positive. Issues arise because the metabolites are present in only low concentrations. If the metabolites are present, it is possible for them to be from other contamination.
