= 2′-Acetoxycocaine =

Names
- IUPAC name Methyl 4β-{[2-(acetyloxy)benzoyl]oxy}tropane-2β-carboxylate
- Systematic IUPAC name Methyl (1R,2R,3S,5S)-3-{[2-(acetyloxy)benzoyl]oxy}-8-methyl-8-azabicyclo[3.2.1]octane-2-carboxylate

Identifiers
CAS Number	192648-66-1
3D model (JSmol)	Interactive image
ChemSpider	8888946
PubChem CID	10713606
UNII	R3WS363295
CompTox Dashboard (EPA)	DTXSID40745423
- InChI: InChI=1S/C19H23NO6/c1-11(21)25-15-7-5-4-6-13(15)18(22)26-16-10-12-8-9-14(20(12)2)17(16)19(23)24-3/h4-7,12,14,16-17H,8-10H2,1-3H3/t12-,14+,16-,17+/m0/s1 Key: BGTCUQCBSAMJBH-JSQNDZKTSA-N; InChI=1/C19H23NO6/c1-11(21)25-15-7-5-4-6-13(15)18(22)26-16-10-12-8-9-14(20(12)2)17(16)19(23)24-3/h4-7,12,14,16-17H,8-10H2,1-3H3/t12-,14+,16-,17+/m0/s1 Key: BGTCUQCBSAMJBH-JSQNDZKTBL
- SMILES: CN1C2C[C@H](OC(C3=C(OC(C)=O)C=CC=C3)=O)[C@H](C(OC)=O)C1CC2

Properties
Chemical formula	C_{19}H_{23}NO_{6}
Molar mass	361.394 g·mol^{−1}
- Except where otherwise noted, data are given for materials in their standard state (at 25 °C [77 °F], 100 kPa). verify (what is ?) Infobox references

2′-Acetoxycocaine (ortho-acetoxy-cocaine) is a cocaine analog, with a quicker effect onset than cocaine. The acetoxy branch renders the molecule a QSAR of a 4-fold increase over cocaine in its binding potency for the dopamine transporter & a 35-fold enhanced affinity for the norepinephrine transporter. It also has a reduced selectivity for the serotonin transporter (though only due to its greater increase at NET & DAT binding being of such an order of magnitude more by comparison). In overall binding affinity (not uptake inhibition) it displaces ligands better across the board than cocaine in all monoamine categories. Salicylmethylecgonine would be an intermediate metabolite in vivo in humans (therefore affecting the overall effect profile of the administered 2′-acetoxy analog via its metabolic route; giving it nearly three times the affinity for DAT, after onset, and greaten the affinity that is would have for NET by a halve more than on upon initial exposure, after rapid deacetylation.) 2′-Acetoxycocaine has a closer to optimum LogP (a square value of 2) for blood–brain barrier penetration (cocaine being higher and logarithmically four times the optimal lipophilicity allowing too much of the compound to be dumped out directly into fatty tissue instead of reaching its target site) this would make it a prodrug to salicylmethylecgonine due to the latter having a less (and the ortho-acetoxy analog having a more) efficacious LogP than its cocaine parent.

Binding comparison between cocaine and semi-synthetic derivative o-acetoxy-cocaine
Compound	DAT [^{3}H]WIN 35428	5-HTT [^{3}H]Paroxetine	NET [^{3}H]Nisoxetine	Selectivity 5-HTT/DAT	Selectivity NET/DAT	LogP^{ɑ}
Cocaine	249 ± 37	615 ± 120	2500 ± 70	2.5	10.0	2.62
2′(ortho)-Acetoxycocaine	70 ± 1	219 ± 20	72 ± 9	3.1	1.0	2.45
2′(ortho)-Hydroxycocaine (human metabolite of 2′(ortho)-acetoxycocaine)	25 ± 4	143 ± 21	48 ± 2	5.7	1.9	2.89

- ^{ɑ}Predictive algorithm used is dynamic and subject to change as database expands, should be taken as suggestive values, and only putative/uncertain as exact quantitative value is concerned.
