= Iprocrolol =

Chemical compound

Clinical data
- ATC code: None

Identifiers
- IUPAC name: 4-Hydroxy-9-[2-hydroxy-3-(isopropylamino)propoxy]-7-methyl-2,3-dihydropyrano[3,2-f]benzofuran-5-one
- CAS Number: 37855-80-4
- ChemSpider: 16736650
- UNII: 796BG09E22
- ChEMBL: ChEMBL1742479

Chemical and physical data
- Formula: C_{18}H_{23}NO_{6}
- Molar mass: 349.383 g·mol^{−1}
- 3D model (JSmol): Interactive image
- SMILES: CC(C)NCC(O)COc2c1OC(\C)=C/C(=O)c1c(O)c3CCOc23
- InChI: InChI=1S/C18H23NO6/c1-9(2)19-7-11(20)8-24-18-16-12(4-5-23-16)15(22)14-13(21)6-10(3)25-17(14)18/h6,9,11,19-20,22H,4-5,7-8H2,1-3H3; Key:YSMZUAMUQKMUAL-UHFFFAOYSA-N

Iprocrolol is a beta blocker that was never marketed.
