= Tropacocaine =

- Stereo Kekulé, skeletal formula of tropacocaine with some explicit hydrogens added

Names
- Systematic IUPAC name 3-exo-8-Methyl-8-azabicyclo[3.2.1]octan-3-yl benzoate
- Other names 3β-Benzoyloxytropane Benzoylpseudotropine; Pseudotropine benzoate Tropacaine

Identifiers
CAS Number	537-26-8
3D model (JSmol)	Interactive image
ChEMBL	ChEMBL419588
ChemSpider	10194103
ECHA InfoCard	100.007.877
EC Number	208-662-4
KEGG	C10848
MeSH	tropacocaine
PubChem CID	10834; 44279436 (1R); 6942461 (1R,5R); 637578 (1R,5S); 6919033 (1S,5S)
UNII	1I92X32F6H
CompTox Dashboard (EPA)	DTXSID70871749
- InChI: InChI=1S/C15H19NO2/c1-16-12-7-8-13(16)10-14(9-12)18-15(17)11-5-3-2-4-6-11/h2-6,12-14H,7-10H2,1H3/t12-,13+,14- Key: XQJMXPAEFMWDOZ-BTTYYORXSA-N
- SMILES: CN3[C@H]1CC[C@@H]3C[C@H](C1)OC(=O)c2ccccc2

Properties
Chemical formula	C_{15}H_{19}NO_{2}
Molar mass	245.322 g·mol^{−1}
log P	2.607
- Except where otherwise noted, data are given for materials in their standard state (at 25 °C [77 °F], 100 kPa). Infobox references

Tropacocaine (tropacaine, benzoylpseudotropine, pseudotropine benzoate, descarbomethoxycocaine) is a cocaine-related alkaloid and a contaminant of street cocaine.

== Chemistry ==
=== Synthesis ===
It can be synthesized from tropine using the Mitsunobu reaction.

== See also ==
- Hydroxytropacocaine
- Benzoylecgonine
- p-Fluorotropacocaine
- Indatraline
- Tropane alkaloid
