= Methylecgonine cinnamate =

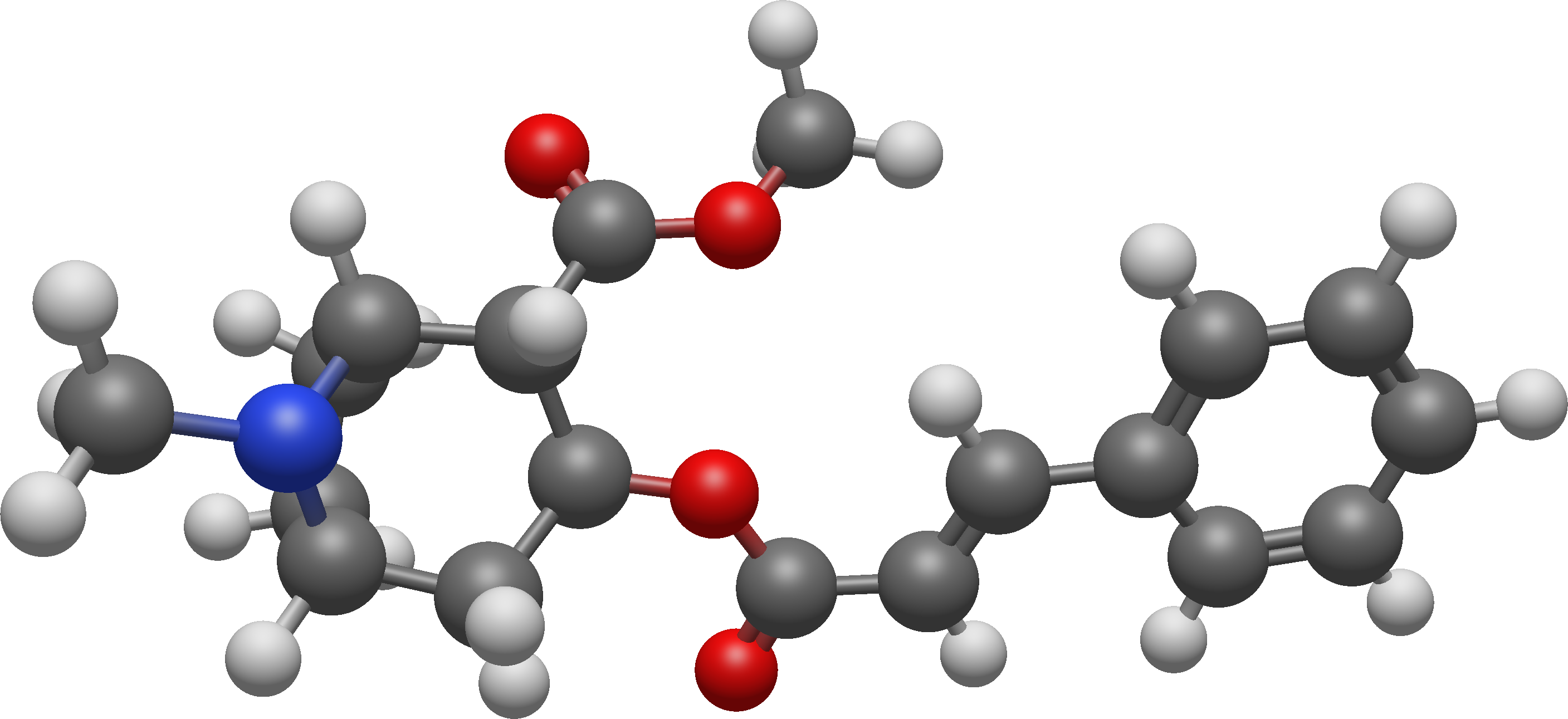

Names
- IUPAC name methyl (1R,2R,3S,5S)-8-methyl-3-[(E)-3-phenylprop-2-enoyl]oxy-8-azabicyclo[3.2.1]octane-2-carboxylate
- Other names Cinnamoylcocaine; Cinnamylcocaine

Identifiers
CAS Number	50763-20-7; 521-67-5 (non-specific)
3D model (JSmol)	Interactive image
ChemSpider	16735745
PubChem CID	6440936
UNII	O3I44O988U
CompTox Dashboard (EPA)	DTXSID701334867 DTXSID60893899, DTXSID701334867
- InChI: InChI=1S/C19H23NO4/c1-20-14-9-10-15(20)18(19(22)23-2)16(12-14)24-17(21)11-8-13-6-4-3-5-7-13/h3-8,11,14-16,18H,9-10,12H2,1-2H3/b11-8+/t14?,15?,16?,18-/m1/s1 Key: MQIXMJWNEKUAOZ-GKMMPQBVSA-N; InChI=1/C19H23NO4/c1-20-14-9-10-15(20)18(19(22)23-2)16(12-14)24-17(21)11-8-13-6-4-3-5-7-13/h3-8,11,14-16,18H,9-10,12H2,1-2H3/b11-8+/t14?,15?,16?,18-/m1/s1 Key: MQIXMJWNEKUAOZ-GKMMPQBVBP
- SMILES: CN3C2CCC3CC(OC(=O)/C=C/c1ccccc1)[C@@H]2C(=O)OC

Properties
Chemical formula	C_{19}H_{23}NO_{4}
Molar mass	329.396 g·mol^{−1}
- Except where otherwise noted, data are given for materials in their standard state (at 25 °C [77 °F], 100 kPa). verify (what is ?) Infobox references

Methylecgonine cinnamate is a natural tropane alkaloid found within the coca plant. Its more common name, cinnamoylcocaine, reflects its close structural similarity to cocaine. It is pharmacologically inactive, but some studies funded by anti-drug agencies imply that it is active when smoked. Furthermore, the discovery of differing impurity products yielding methylecgonine cinnamate in confiscated cocaine have led enforcing agencies to postulate that illicit manufacturers have changed their oxidation procedures when refining cocaine from a crude form. Methylecgonine cinnamate can dimerize to the truxillic acid derivative truxilline. Methylecgonine cinnamate is mentioned in patents of active cocaine analogue structures.

== See also ==
- Coca alkaloids
- Cocaethylene
- Salicylmethylecgonine
