= Metaphit =

Names
- Preferred IUPAC name 1-[1-(3-Isothiocyanatophenyl)cyclohexyl]piperidine

Identifiers
CAS Number	96316-00-6
3D model (JSmol)	Interactive image
ChEMBL	ChEMBL41541
ChemSpider	102730
PubChem CID	114745
UNII	NFS3HJC8WD
CompTox Dashboard (EPA)	DTXSID00914572
- InChI: InChI=1S/C18H24N2S/c21-15-19-17-9-7-8-16(14-17)18(10-3-1-4-11-18)20-12-5-2-6-13-20/h7-9,14H,1-6,10-13H2 Key: FGSGBQAQSPSRJK-UHFFFAOYSA-N; InChI=1/C18H24N2S/c21-15-19-17-9-7-8-16(14-17)18(10-3-1-4-11-18)20-12-5-2-6-13-20/h7-9,14H,1-6,10-13H2 Key: FGSGBQAQSPSRJK-UHFFFAOYAE
- SMILES: S=C=N\c1cccc(c1)C3(N2CCCCC2)CCCCC3

Properties
Chemical formula	C_{18}H_{24}N_{2}S
Molar mass	300.462
- Except where otherwise noted, data are given for materials in their standard state (at 25 °C [77 °F], 100 kPa). verify (what is ?) Infobox references

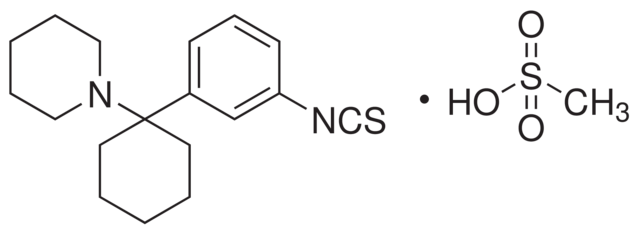
Metaphit as a methanesulfonate salt

Metaphit (1-[1-(3-Isothiocyanato)phenyl]cyclohexylpiperidine) is a research chemical that acts as an acylator of NMDARAn, sigma and DAT binding sites in the CNS. It is the m-isothiocyanate derivative of phencyclidine (PCP) and binds irreversibly (forming a covalent bond) to the PCP binding site on the NMDA receptor complex. However, later studies suggest the functionality of metaphit is mediated by sites not involved in PCP-induced passive avoidance deficit, and not related to the NMDA receptor complex. Metaphit was also shown to prevent d-amphetamine induced hyperactivity, while significantly depleting dopamine content in the nucleus accumbens. Metaphit was the first acylating ligand used to study the cocaine receptor. It is a structural isomer of the similar research compound fourphit, as it and metaphit both are isothiocyanate substituted derivatives of an analogous scaffold shared with PCP.

== See also ==
- RTI-76
- p-ISOCOC
- Methocinnamox
