= Tazopsine =

Names
- IUPAC name 3,8-Dimethoxy-8,14-didehydro-9α,13α-morphinan-4,6β,7β,10β-tetrol
- Systematic IUPAC name (2S,3S,4aS,9R,10R)-1,6-dimethoxy-3,4,9,10-tetrahydro-2H-10,4a-(azanoethano)phenanthrene-2,3,5,9-tetrol

Identifiers
3D model (JSmol)	Interactive image
ChEMBL	ChEMBL493786
ChemSpider	24706853
PubChem CID	11653181
CompTox Dashboard (EPA)	DTXSID201045607
- InChI: InChI=1S/C18H23NO6/c1-24-10-4-3-8-11(16(10)23)18-5-6-19-13(14(8)21)12(18)17(25-2)15(22)9(20)7-18/h3-4,9,13-15,19-23H,5-7H2,1-2H3/t9-,13+,14+,15-,18-/m0/s1 Key: CQFMGBHPLGTYRE-ZERSTCQWSA-N; InChI=1/C18H23NO6/c1-24-10-4-3-8-11(16(10)23)18-5-6-19-13(14(8)21)12(18)17(25-2)15(22)9(20)7-18/h3-4,9,13-15,19-23H,5-7H2,1-2H3/t9-,13+,14+,15-,18-/m0/s1 Key: CQFMGBHPLGTYRE-ZERSTCQWBW
- SMILES: COc1ccc2c(c1O)[C@@]34CCN[C@@H]([C@@H]2O)C3=C([C@H]([C@H](C4)O)O)OC

Properties
Chemical formula	C_{18}H_{23}NO_{6}
Molar mass	349.38 g/mol
- Except where otherwise noted, data are given for materials in their standard state (at 25 °C [77 °F], 100 kPa). Infobox references

Tazopsine is a plant-isolate morphinan.
