= Salicylmethylecgonine =

Chemical compound

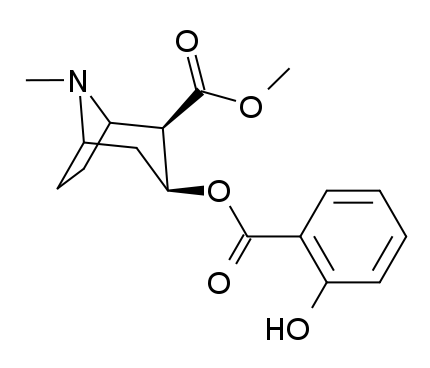

Legal status
- Legal status: US: Schedule II

Identifiers
- IUPAC name: methyl (1R,2R,3S,5S)-3-(2-hydroxybenzoyloxy)-8-methyl-8-azabicyclo[3.2.1] octane-2-carboxylate
- CAS Number: 89339-17-3
- PubChem CID: 10519659
- ChemSpider: 8695057
- UNII: K8J4W658QK
- CompTox Dashboard (EPA): DTXSID501029282

Chemical and physical data
- Formula: C_{17}H_{21}NO_{5}
- Molar mass: 319.357 g·mol^{−1}
- 3D model (JSmol): Interactive image
- SMILES: CN1[C@H]2CC[C@@H]1[C@H]([C@H](C2)OC(=O)C3=CC=CC=C3O)C(=O)OC
- InChI: InChI=1S/C17H21NO5/c1-18-10-7-8-12(18)15(17(21)22-2)14(9-10)23-16(20)11-5-3-4-6-13(11)19/h3-6,10,12,14-15,19H,7-9H2,1-2H3/t10-,12+,14-,15+/m0/s1; Key:PEISRHQJLATJPJ-MMMKDXCPSA-N

Salicylmethylecgonine, (2′-Hydroxycocaine) is a tropane derivative drug which is both a synthetic analogue and a possible active metabolite of cocaine. Its potency in vitro is around 10x that of cocaine, although it is only around three times more potent than cocaine when administered to mice (likely owing to it having a higher LogP: 2.89 than that of cocaine: 2.62) Note however that the compound 2′-Acetoxycocaine would act as a prodrug to Salicylmethylecgonine in humans, and has a more efficient partition coefficient which would act as a delivery system and would circumvent this reason for a drop in potency. Salicylmethylecgonine also shows increased behavioral stimulation compared to cocaine similar to the phenyltropanes. The hydroxy branch renders the molecule a QSAR of a 10-fold increase over cocaine in its binding potency for the dopamine transporter & a 52-fold enhanced affinity for the norepinephrine transporter. It also has a reduced selectivity for the serotonin transporter though only due to its greater increase at NET binding; its SERT affinity being 4-fold increased compared to cocaine. However, in overall binding affinity (not uptake inhibition) it displaces ligands better across the board than cocaine in all monoamine categories.

Binding comparison between cocaine and semi-synthetic derivative o-hydroxy-cocaine
Compound	DAT [^{3}H]WIN 35428	5-HTT [^{3}H]Paroxetine	NET [^{3}H]Nisoxetine	Selectivity 5-HTT/DAT	Selectivity NET/DAT
Cocaine	249 ± 37	615 ± 120	2500 ± 70	2.5	10.0
2′(ortho)-hydroxycocaine	25 ± 4	143 ± 21	48 ± 2	5.7	1.9

Study of molecular modeling inferred that, in addition to intramolecular hydrogen bonding between the adjacent 3β-carbonyl and the 2′-OH ortho group of 185d (i.e. salicylmethylecgonine), that intermolecular hydrogen bonding between its hydroxy ortho substituent and the dopamine transporter was also possible; and was rationalized to be due to its nearness of where the nitrogen and oxygen atoms reside in the para-hydroxy of dopamine itself and its own intrinsic relation to DAT whereby that mutual hydroxyl functionality is mediated in both salicylmethylecgonine and dopamine in a similar manner. That is, at serine residue 359 on DAT, as the distance of the hydroxy to the bridge-nitrogen on salicylmethylecgonine is 7.96 Å (close to that of the distance between the p-OH & the NH_{2} atoms of dopamine, their distance apart being 7.83 Å). Which may play a role in this analogs increased behavioral stimulation over its parent compound cocaine. The meta-hydroxy group of dopamine, by contrast, has a distance of 6.38 Å from its nitrogen and is believed to engage with the 356 residue on DAT.

== See also ==
- 4′-Fluorococaine
- Benzoylecgonine
- Cocaine reverse ester
- Ecgonine
- Methylecgonine cinnamate
- Norcocaine
- RTI-160
- List of cocaine analogues
