= Cocaethylene =

Chemical compound

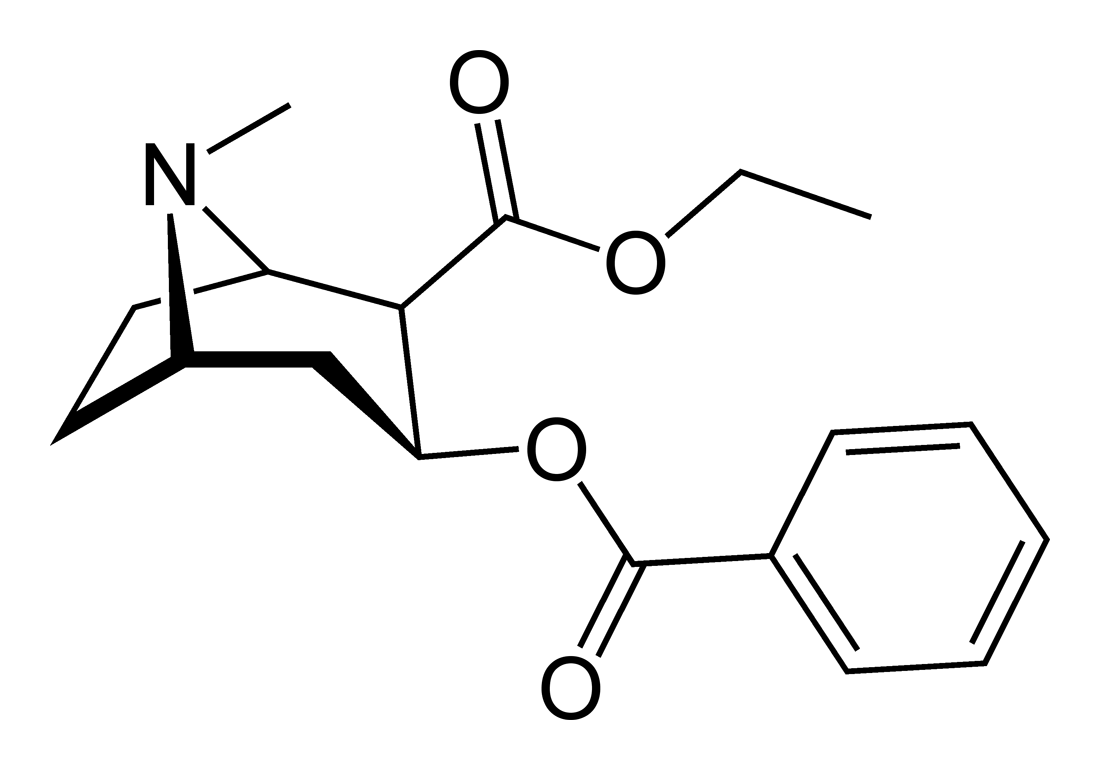

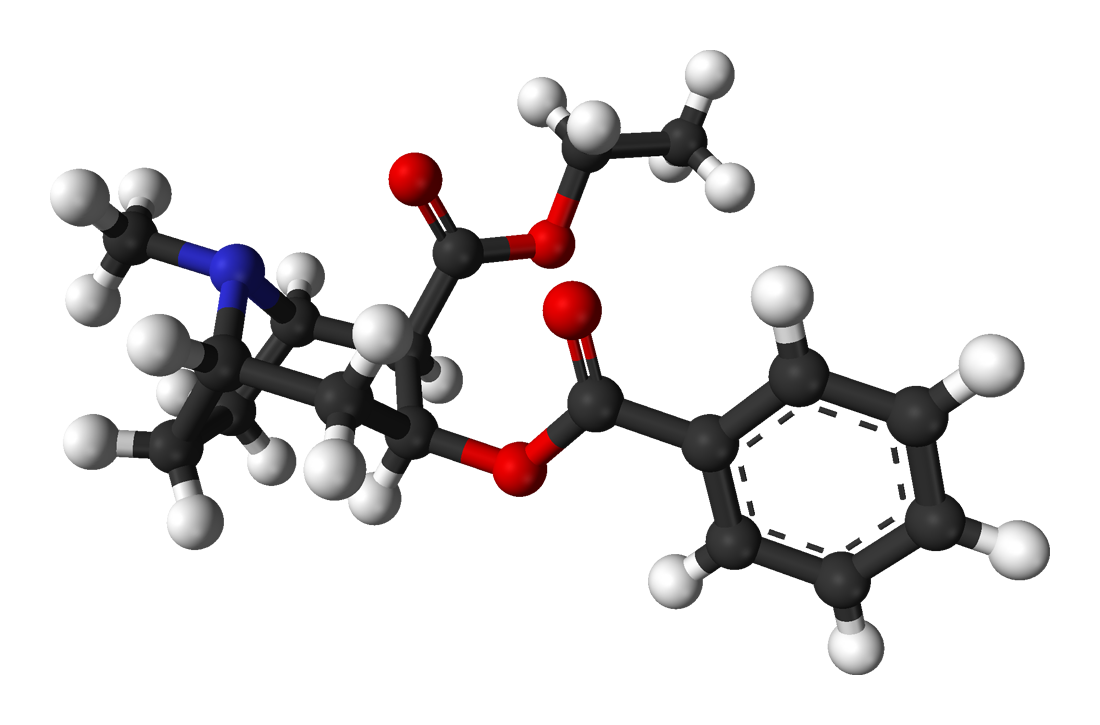

Clinical data
- Other names: benzoylecgonine ethyl ester, ethylbenzoylecgonine,
- Pregnancy category: C
- Routes of administration: Produced from ingestion of cocaine and ethanol
- Drug class: Serotonin-norepinephrine-dopamine reuptake inhibitor

Legal status
- Legal status: UK: Controlled Drug; US: Schedule II

Identifiers
- IUPAC name: ethyl (2R,3S)-3-benzoyloxy-8-methyl-8-azabicyclo[3.2.1]octane-2-carboxylate
- CAS Number: 529-38-4
- PubChem CID: 65034
- ChemSpider: 559082
- UNII: FJO3071W5Y
- ChEMBL: ChEMBL608806
- CompTox Dashboard (EPA): DTXSID20873213
- ECHA InfoCard: 100.164.816

Chemical and physical data
- Formula: C_{18}H_{23}NO_{4}
- Molar mass: 317.385 g·mol^{−1}
- 3D model (JSmol): Interactive image
- SMILES: O=C(O[C@H]1C[C@H]2N(C)[C@@H]([C@H]1C(=O)OCC)CC2)c3ccccc3

Cocaethylene (ethylbenzoylecgonine) is the ethyl ester of benzoylecgonine. It is structurally similar to cocaine, which is the methyl ester of benzoylecgonine. Cocaethylene is formed by the liver in small amounts when cocaine and ethanol coexist in the blood. Cocaethylene was first synthesized in 1885; its side effects were identified in 1989. It acts as a serotonin-norepinephrine-dopamine reuptake inhibitor (SNDRI), with stimulant and euphoriant properties.

== Metabolic production from cocaine ==
Cocaethylene is one of the three byproducts of concurrent consumption of alcohol and cocaine as they are metabolized by the liver. Normally, the hepatic enzyme carboxylesterase catalyzes the hydrolysis of cocaine in the liver, producing two primarily biologically inactive metabolites—benzoylecgonine and ecgonine methyl ester. If ethanol is also present in the liver, a portion of the cocaine undergoes transesterification with ethanol rather than hydrolysis with water, producing cocaethylene.

cocaine + H_{2}O → benzoylecgonine + methanol (with liver carboxylesterase 1)
benzoylecgonine + ethanol → cocaethylene + H_{2}O
cocaine + ethanol → cocaethylene + methanol (with liver carboxylesterase 1)

== Physiological effects ==
Cocaethylene increases the levels of serotonergic, noradrenergic, and dopaminergic neurotransmission in the brain and has a higher affinity for the dopamine transporter than cocaine, but has a lower affinity for the serotonin and norepinephrine transporters. These pharmacological properties attribute cocaethylene as a serotonin-norepinephrine-dopamine reuptake inhibitor (SNDRI; also known as a "triple reuptake inhibitor").

Although it cannot be directly purchased, cocaethylene is largely considered recreational in and of itself, with stimulant, euphoriant, anorectic, sympathomimetic, and local anesthetic properties with a longer duration of action (about 2 hours) than cocaine (about 1 hour). A study conducted by Hart et al. in the 2000s studied the effects of IV cocaethylene in humans; the findings concluded that "cocaethylene has pharmacological properties in common with cocaine, but is less potent," which appears consistent with prior research.

=== Risks ===
While cocaethylene is more dangerous when administered alone, research suggests that the increase in risk from combining cocaine and ethanol is "thought to be due to alcohol decreasing the metabolism of cocaine and, therefore, increasing [...] cocaine concentrations with only a minimal (if any) contribution to an increased risk from the formation of cocaethylene".

==== Use in research about combined use of cocaine and alcohol ====
Some studies suggest that consuming alcohol in combination with cocaine may be more cardiotoxic than cocaine and "also carries an 18-25 fold increase over cocaine alone in the risk of [causing] immediate death".

Cocaethylene has been used as a biomarker for simultaneous alcohol and cocaine consumption, often taken from samples of humans wastewater. A 2021 study used this technique to show that people who consume alcohol and cocaine together have a higher risk of liver issues.

== See also ==
- Ethylphenidate
- Euphoriants
- Methylvanillylecgonine
- Local anesthetics
- RTI-160
- Stimulants
- Tropanes
- Vin Mariani
- Pemberton's French Wine Coca
