= 4′-Fluorococaine =

Chemical compound

Legal status
- Legal status: UK: Under Psychoactive Substances Act; US: Schedule II

Identifiers
- IUPAC name: methyl (1R,2R,3S,5S)-3-(4-fluorobenzoyloxy)-8-methyl-8-azabicyclo[3.2.1] octane-2-carboxylate
- CAS Number: 134507-62-3
- PubChem CID: 126112
- ChemSpider: 112124
- UNII: 6045353J3C
- CompTox Dashboard (EPA): DTXSID10928640

Chemical and physical data
- Formula: C_{17}H_{20}FNO_{4}
- Molar mass: 321.348 g·mol^{−1}
- 3D model (JSmol): Interactive image
- SMILES: CN1[C@H]2CC[C@@H]1[C@H]([C@H](C2)OC(=O)C3=CC=C(C=C3)F)C(=O)OC
- InChI: InChI=1S/C17H20FNO4/c1-19-12-7-8-13(19)15(17(21)22-2)14(9-12)23-16(20)10-3-5-11(18)6-4-10/h3-6,12-15H,7-9H2,1-2H3/t12-,13-,14-,15+/m0/s1; Key:JRPRINGETIYVSV-ZQDZILKHSA-N

4′-Fluorococaine is a tropane derivative drug which is a synthetic analogue of cocaine. Unlike related compounds such as the corresponding 4′-fluorophenyltropane derivative CFT and the 2′-hydroxy analogue salicylmethylecgonine, 4′-fluorococaine has only around the same potency as cocaine as an inhibitor of dopamine reuptake, but conversely it is a much stronger serotonin reuptake inhibitor than cocaine, resulting in a significantly altered pharmacological profile in animal studies.

== See also ==
- pFBT
- Cocaethylene
- List of cocaine analogues
