= Pharmacology of selegiline =

Pharmacology of the antiparkinsonian and antidepressant selegiline

Clinical data
- Routes of administration: • Oral (tablet, capsule) • Buccal (ODT) • Transdermal (patch)
- Drug class: Monoamine oxidase inhibitor; Catecholaminergic activity enhancer; Norepinephrine releasing agent; Antiparkinsonian; Antidepressant; Neuroprotective

Pharmacokinetic data
- Bioavailability: Oral: 4–10% ODT: ~5–8× oral Patch: 75%
- Protein binding: 85–90%
- Metabolism: Liver, other tissues (CYP2B6, CYP2C19, others)
- Metabolites: • Desmethylselegiline (DMS) • Levomethamphetamine (L-MA) • Levoamphetamine (L-A)
- Onset of action: Oral: ≤1 hour
- Elimination half-life: Oral: • S (single): 1.2–3.5 h • S (multi): 7.7–9.7 h • DMS (single): 2.2–3.8 h • DMS (multi): 9.5 h • L-MA: 14–21 h • L-A: 16–18 h ODT: • S (single): 1.3 h • S (multi): 10 h Patch: • S: 20 h
- Duration of action: 2–3 days (Parkinson's disease relief)
- Excretion: Urine (87%): • L-MA: 20–63% • L-A: 9–26% • DMS: 1% • S: 0.01–0.03% Feces: 15%

The pharmacology of selegiline pertains to the pharmacodynamic and pharmacokinetic properties of the antiparkinsonian and antidepressant selegiline (L-deprenyl). Selegiline is available in a few different forms, including oral tablets and capsules, orally disintegrating tablets (ODTs), and transdermal patches. These forms have differing pharmacological properties.

In terms of pharmacodynamics, selegiline acts as a monoamine oxidase (MAO) inhibitor. It is a selective inhibitor of monoamine oxidase B (MAO-B) at lower doses but additionally inhibits monoamine oxidase A (MAO-A) at higher doses. MAO-B inhibition is thought to result in increased levels of dopamine and β-phenethylamine, whereas MAO-A inhibition results in increased levels of serotonin, norepinephrine, and dopamine. Selegiline is also a catecholaminergic activity enhancer (CAE) and enhances the action potential-evoked release of norepinephrine and dopamine. Through its active metabolites levomethamphetamine and levoamphetamine, selegiline acts as a weak norepinephrine and/or dopamine releasing agent. The clinical significance of this action is unclear, but it may be relevant to the effects and side effects of selegiline, especially at higher doses.

With regard to pharmacokinetics, the bioavailability of the oral form is 4 to 10%, of the ODT is 5 to 8 times that of the oral form, and of the transdermal patch is 75%. The plasma protein binding of selegiline is 85 to 90%. It is metabolized extensively in the liver by the cytochrome P450 enzyme CYP2B6 among other enzymes. Metabolites of selegiline include desmethylselegiline (DMS), levomethamphetamine, and levoamphetamine. The oral form of selegiline is subject to strong first-pass metabolism and levels of the metabolites of selegiline are much lower with the ODT and transdermal patch forms than with the oral form. The elimination half-lives of selegiline and its metabolites range from 1.2 to 10 hours for selegiline, 2.2 to 9.5 hours for DMS, 14 to 21 hours for levomethamphetamine, and 16 to 18 hours for levoamphetamine. Selegiline and its metabolites are eliminated mainly in urine, with its metabolites accounting for the vast majority of eliminated material in the case of the oral form.

== Pharmacodynamics ==
=== Monoamine oxidase inhibitor ===
Selegiline acts as an inhibitor of the enzyme monoamine oxidase (MAO) and hence is known as a monoamine oxidase inhibitor (MAOI). There are two types of MAO, MAO-A and MAO-B. MAO-A metabolizes the monoamine neurotransmitters serotonin, dopamine, and norepinephrine as well as trace amines like tyramine, whereas MAO-B metabolizes dopamine and the trace amine β-phenethylamine. At lower concentrations and at typical clinical doses (≤10 mg/day), selegiline selectively inhibits MAO-B. Conversely, at higher concentrations and doses (≥20 mg/day), selegiline additionally inhibits MAO-A. By selectively inhibiting MAO-B, selegiline increases levels of dopamine in the brain and thereby increases dopaminergic neurotransmission. At higher doses, by inhibiting both MAO-A and MAO-B, selegiline increases brain levels of serotonin, dopamine, and norepinephrine and thereby increases serotonergic, dopaminergic, and noradrenergic neurotransmission. Selegiline is an irreversible mechanism-based inhibitor (suicide inhibitor) of MAO that acts by covalently binding to the active site of the enzyme and thereby disabling it. Selegiline is thought to exert its therapeutic effects in the treatment of the motor symptoms of Parkinson's disease by increasing dopamine levels in the substantia nigra pars compacta (SNpc) of the basal ganglia, which projects to the caudate nucleus and putamen of the striatum, thereby enhancing the signaling of the nigrostriatal pathway. In addition to the nigrostriatal pathway, selegiline may also influence and potentiate other dopaminergic pathways and areas, including the mesolimbic pathway, mesocortical pathway, tuberoinfundibular pathway, and chemoreceptor trigger zone, which may also be involved in its effects as well as side effects. Selegiline and other MAO-B inhibitors may additionally improve non-motor symptoms in Parkinson's disease, for instance depression and motivational deficits, by increasing dopamine levels. Selegiline may have some disease-modifying neuroprotective effects in Parkinson's disease by inhibiting the MAO-B-mediated oxidation of dopamine into reactive oxygen species that damage dopaminergic neurons in the nigrostriatal pathway via oxidative stress. However, the pathophysiology of Parkinson's disease is complex and multifacted, and MAO-B inhibitors may only slow the progression of the disease and do not halt it.

The MAO-B inhibition by oral selegiline shows dosage dependence at typical therapeutic doses and below (i.e., ≤10 mg/day). Selegiline almost completely inhibits MAO-B in blood platelets at an oral dosage of 10 mg/day. Following a single 5 or 10 mg oral dose of selegiline, 86 to 90% of MAO-B activity in platelets was inhibited within 2 to 4 hours and 98% of activity was inhibited after 24 hours. MAO-B inhibition with lower doses of selegiline has also been assessed. A dosage of oral selegiline of 1 mg/day for 10 days inhibited platelet MAO-B activity by about 75 to 100% in 3 individuals. In another study, a single oral dose of selegiline was found to maximally inhibit platelet MAO-B activity by 23% at 0.5 mg, 40% at 1.0 mg, 52% at 1.5 mg, 85% at 5 mg, and 96% at 10 mg and with maximal inhibition occurring after 0.5 to 0.8 hours. For comparison, a single 0.5 mg dose by intravenous injection maximally inhibited platelet MAO-B activity by 80 ± 15% in the same study and this occurred within 5 minutes. Using a logistic model, it was estimated that a 3.4 mg oral dose of selegiline would be equivalent to 0.5 mg intravenously (an 85% or 7:1 lower dose) in terms of MAO-B inhibition. In people with Parkinson's disease, selegiline at dosages of 10 mg/day, 5 mg/day, 10 mg twice weekly (or 20 mg/week), and 10 mg once a week resulted in greater than 95% inhibition of platelet MAO-B activity within 1 week with all dosages except the 10 mg weekly dose. The specific degrees of inhibition after 4 weeks were 99.4% with 10 mg/day, 99.5% with 5 mg/day, 96.0% with 10 mg twice per week, and 75.9% with 10 mg once per week, respectively. On the basis of these findings, it was concluded that 20 mg per week (as 10 mg twice per week) is the minimum dosage that can produce maximal and long-lasting inhibition of platelet MAO-B activity. There is considerable (>5-fold) accumulation of selegiline with daily repeated administration, which may increase its potency in terms of MAO-B inhibition relative to single doses.

Following a single 5 or 10 mg oral dose of selegiline, inhibition of platelet MAO-B activity persisted at above 90% for 5 days and almost 14 days were required before activity returned to baseline. Besides the degree of inhibition of MAO-B, the time for MAO-B activity to return to baseline also shows dosage dependence. Platelet MAO-B activity returned to normal within 24 hours with a single 0.5 mg oral dose, whereas 1 week was required for single 1.0 and 1.5 mg oral doses and 2 weeks were required after single 10 mg oral or 0.5 mg intravenous doses.

The recommended dosing schedule of selegiline in Parkinson's disease (10 mg/day) has been described as somewhat questionable and potentially excessive from a pharmacological standpoint. Selegiline has been predicted to inhibit platelet MAO-B activity by approximately 95% or more after 96 hours with 2.5 mg/day, after 48 hours with 5.0 or 7.5 mg/day, and within 24 hours with a single 10 mg dose. Following this however, it is predicted that there will be a plateau and complete or near-complete MAO-B inhibition regardless of whether the dosage is 2.5 or 10 mg/day. Relatedly, researchers have called for lower doses of selegiline, like 2.5 or 5 mg/day or 10 mg twice per week (20 mg/week total), to be evaluated in clinical trials. It has been suggested that lower doses of selegiline could be equally effective in terms of MAO-B inhibition as conventional doses and potentially in terms of clinical effectiveness. However, per some researchers, optimal effectiveness of selegiline in Parkinson's disease seems to require a dosage of 10 mg/day and its effectiveness lasts only about 2 to 3 days following discontinuation. On the other hand, another study found that 5 mg/day produced the same benefit as 10 mg/day in people with Parkinson's disease.

Peripheral and brain MAO-B are assumed to be inhibited with selegiline to similar extents. Accordingly, selegiline at an MAO-B-selective dosage of 10 mg/day has been found to inhibit brain MAO-B by more than 90% in postmortem individuals with Parkinson's disease. This dosage of selegiline has been found in such individuals to produce increases in brain levels of dopamine of 23 to 350% and of β-phenethylamine of 1,200 to 3,400% depending on the brain area and the study. Brain MAO-B levels recover slowly upon discontinuation of selegiline, with a half-time of brain MAO-B synthesis and recovery of approximately 40 days in humans.

Selegiline inhibits MAO-B by 50% at a very low concentration of 26 pg/mL in vivo, indicating that it is a very potent MAO-B inhibitor. It is about 500 to 1,000 times more potent in inhibiting MAO-B than MAO-A in vitro and about 100 times more potent in vivo in rodents. The clinical selectivity of selegiline for MAO-B is lost at oral doses of the drug above 20 mg/day. In a study of post-mortem individuals who were on selegiline 10 mg/day, MAO-A activity in the brain was inhibited by 38 to 86%. A more recent study using positron emission tomography (PET) imaging similarly found inhibition of brain MAO-A by 33 to 70% in humans. However, while brain dopamine and β-phenethylamine levels are substantially increased at this dosage, brain levels of serotonin and its metabolite 5-hydroxyindoleacetic acid (5-HIAA) remain unchanged. It has been found in animal studies that brain MAO-A must be inhibited by nearly 85% before serotonin, norepinephrine, or dopamine levels increase and result in increased functional activity as well as accompanying behavioral changes. Selegiline at an oral dosage of 10 mg/day does not cause the "cheese effect" as assessed by oral tyramine and β-phenethylamine challenge tests. These findings indicate that selegiline does not importantly inhibit MAO-A at a dosage of 10 mg/day. However, a dosage of 20 mg/day selegiline did increase the pressor effect of tyramine, indicating that doses this high and above can significantly inhibit MAO-A. The "cheese reaction" is known to be specifically dependent on inhibition of intestinal MAO-A.

In accordance with its MAOI activity, selegiline (30–60 mg/day) has been found to decrease blood levels of 3,4-dihydroxyphenylacetic acid (DOPAC) (by >50%) and 3,4-dihydroxyphenylglycol (DHPG) (by >65%), the main terminal metabolites of dopamine and norepinephrine, respectively. Conversely, circulating levels of norepinephrine and epinephrine, as well as L-DOPA, were not significantly affected in the study.

Besides affecting circulating catecholamine levels and increasing brain dopamine levels via MAO-B inhibition, selegiline strongly increases endogenous levels of β-phenethylamine, a major substrate of MAO-B. Levels of β-phenethylamine in the brain are increased 10- to 30-fold and levels in urine are increased 20- to 90-fold. Circulating levels of β-phenethylamine are also increased to a much lesser extent. β-Phenethylamine is normally present in small amounts in the brain and urine and has been referred to as "endogenous amphetamine". Similarly to amphetamines, it induces the release of norepinephrine and dopamine and produces psychostimulant effects. In addition, β-phenethylamine is an endogenous monoaminergic activity enhancer (see more below). Selegiline also strongly increases levels of β-phenethylamine with exogenous administration of β-phenethylamine. The increase in endogenous levels of β-phenethylamine with selegiline might be involved in its effects, for instance claimed "psychic energizing" and mood-lifting effects as well as its effectiveness in the treatment of Parkinson's disease. In contrast to amphetamine psychostimulants however, selegiline is thought to have little or no misuse potential. In relation to its elevation of β-phenethylamine levels, selegiline has been described as not only having dopaminergic actions (by increasing dopamine levels) but also having "trace-aminergic" effects.

The MAO-B inhibition of deprenyl lies mainly in selegiline (L-deprenyl), which is 150-fold more potent than D-deprenyl at inhibiting MAO-B. Besides selegiline itself, desmethylselegiline, one of its major metabolites, is pharmacologically active. Compared to selegiline, desmethylselegiline is 60-fold less potent in inhibiting MAO-B in vitro, but is only 3- to 6-fold less potent in vivo. Although desmethylselegiline levels with selegiline therapy are low, selegiline and desmethylselegiline are highly potent MAO-B inhibitors due to the irreversible nature of their inhibition. As such, desmethylselegiline may contribute significantly to the MAO-B inhibition with selegiline. In contrast to desmethylselegiline, two of selegiline's other metabolites, levomethamphetamine and levoamphetamine, do not significantly inhibit MAO-B at concentrations of as high as 100 ng/mL in vitro.

In 2021, it was discovered that MAO-A is solely or almost entirely responsible for striatal dopamine catabolism in the rodent brain and that MAO-B is not importantly involved. In contrast, MAO-B appears to mediate tonic γ-aminobutyric acid (GABA) synthesis from putrescine in the striatum, a minor and alternative metabolic pathway of GABA synthesis, and this synthesized GABA in turn inhibits dopaminergic neurons in this brain area. MAO-B specifically mediates the transformations of putrescine into γ-aminobutyraldehyde (GABAL or GABA aldehyde) and N-acetylputrescine into N-acetyl-γ-aminobutyraldehyde (N-acetyl-GABAL or N-acetyl-GABA aldehyde), metabolic products that can then be converted into GABA via aldehyde dehydrogenase (ALDH) (and an unknown deacetylase enzyme in the case of N-acetyl-GABAL). These findings may warrant a rethinking of the pharmacological actions of MAO-B inhibitors like selegiline in the treatment of Parkinson's disease.

=== Catecholaminergic activity enhancer ===
Selegiline has been found to act as a catecholaminergic activity enhancer (CAE). It selectively enhances the activity of noradrenergic and dopaminergic neurons and does not affect the activity of serotonergic neurons. The CAE actions of selegiline are distinct from those of catecholamine releasing agents like amphetamines. Conversely, the actions are shared with certain trace amines like β-phenethylamine and tryptamine. Selegiline and other CAEs enhance only impulse propagation-mediated release of catecholamines. In relation to this, they lack the misuse potential of amphetamines. Selegiline is active as a CAE at far lower concentrations and doses than those at which it starts to inhibit the monoamine oxidases. For example, selegiline given subcutaneously in rodents selectively inhibits MAO-B with a single dose of at least 0.2 mg/kg, whereas CAE effects are apparent for noradrenergic neurons at a dose of 0.01 mg/kg (+42% activity) and for dopaminergic neurons at a dose of 0.025 mg/kg (+17% activity) (i.e., 8- to 20-fold lower doses). (Note: Selegiline given subcutaneously to rodents selectively inhibits MAO-B with a single 0.2–2.0 mg/kg dose or a continuous 0.05 to 0.25 mg/kg dosage and substantially inhibits MAO-A at a continuous dosage of 1.0 mg/kg. It also produces catecholaminergic activity enhancer (CAE) effects with a subcutaneous dose of 0.01 mg/kg (+42% activity) for noradrenergic neurons and at a dose of 0.025 mg/kg (+17% activity) for dopaminergic neurons. For comparison, the dosage used in humans orally is around 1 mg per 10 kg or 0.1 mg/kg daily.) Monoaminergic activity enhancers (MAEs) show a peculiar and characteristic bimodal concentration–response relationship, with two bell-shaped curves of activity across tested concentration ranges. Selegiline is presently the only registered pharmaceutical medication with CAE actions that lacks concomitant potent catecholamine releasing effects.

Other MAEs besides selegiline, like phenylpropylaminopentane (PPAP) and benzofuranylpropylaminopentane (BPAP), have been developed. PPAP was derived from selegiline (and by extension from β-phenethylamine), while BPAP was derived from tryptamine. These compounds are more potent and selective in their MAE actions than selegiline. In addition, BPAP is an activity enhancer of not only catecholaminergic neurons but also of serotonergic neurons. Unlike selegiline, PPAP and BPAP lack the MAO inhibition and amphetamine metabolites of selegiline, although BPAP has also been found to inhibit the reuptake of dopamine, norepinephrine, and serotonin at higher concentrations than its MAE activity.

The actions of MAEs including selegiline may be due to TAAR1 agonism. TAAR1 agonists have been found to enhance the release of monoamine neurotransmitters like dopamine and serotonin analogously to MAEs; trace amines like β-phenethylamine and tryptamine are known to act as both TAAR1 agonists and MAEs; and the TAAR1 antagonist EPPTB has been shown to reverse the CAE effects of BPAP and selegiline, among other findings. However, it has yet to be determined whether MAEs like BPAP and selegiline actually directly bind to and activate the TAAR1. Moreover, in an older study of MAO-B knockout mice, no non-MAO binding of radiolabeled selegiline was detected in the brain, suggesting that this agent might not act directly via a macromolecular target in terms of its MAE effects. In any case, selegiline's active metabolites levomethamphetamine and levoamphetamine have been confirmed to bind to and activate the TAAR1. As with selegiline, levomethamphetamine and levoamphetamine are also CAEs, although levomethamphetamine is 1- to 10-fold less potent in this action than selegiline itself. Another metabolite of selegiline, desmethylselegiline, has been found to act as a CAE as well.

Though selegiline does not appear to have been assessed at the human TAAR1, it is an agonist of the mouse TAAR1 with an EC_{50} of 1,986 nM and an E_{max} of 61%. This was much less potent than amphetamine or methamphetamine enantiomers (EC_{50} = 2 to 70 nM, E_{max} = 79 to 95%). Increased levels of dopamine and norepinephrine in the medial prefrontal cortex (mPFC), antidepressant-like effects, and antiobsessional-like effects of selegiline and various other antidepressants in mice in vivo remain present in TAAR1 knockout mice. Conversely, these effects with the TAAR1 agonist o-phenyl-3-iodotyramine (o-PIT) are reduced or blunted.

In contrast to selegiline and desmethylselegiline, rasagiline and its racemic N-methylated analogue SU-11739 (AGN-1133, J-508) are devoid of CAE actions. In fact, rasagiline actually inhibits the CAE effects of selegiline. This may explain differences in effectiveness between selegiline and rasagiline in the treatment of Parkinson's disease. According to József Knoll, one of the original developers of selegiline, the CAE effect of selegiline may be more important than MAO-B inhibition in terms of effectiveness for Parkinson's disease. Rasagiline may act as a TAAR1 antagonist to mediate its anti-CAE effects. However, as with selegiline, binding to and modulation of the TAAR1 by rasagiline still requires confirmation.

Selegiline has potent pro-sexual or aphrodisiac effects in male rodents. The pro-sexual effects of selegiline are stronger than those of dopamine agonists like apomorphine and bromocriptine and high doses of amphetamine. These effects are not shared with other MAO-B inhibitors nor with the MAO-A inhibitor clorgiline and hence do not appear to be related to MAO inhibition. Instead, the CAE actions of selegiline have been implicated in the pro-sexual effects. Although selegiline has shown potent pro-sexual effects in rodents, these effects were not subsequently confirmed in primates. In humans, selegiline for depression shows minimal pro-sexual effects in men, though it did significantly enhance several areas of sexual function in women. However, this may have been due to improvement in depression.

=== Catecholamine releasing agent ===
Levomethamphetamine and levoamphetamine are major metabolites of selegiline and are also pharmacologically active. They are sympathomimetic and psychostimulant agents that work by inducing the release of norepinephrine and dopamine in the body and brain.

The involvement of levomethamphetamine and levoamphetamine in the effects of selegiline is controversial. The levels of these metabolites are relatively low and are potentially below pharmacological concentrations at typical clinical doses of selegiline. In any case, both beneficial and harmful effects of these metabolites have been postulated. It is unknown whether the metabolites are involved in the effectiveness of selegiline in the treatment of Parkinson's disease. It has been said that the amphetamine metabolites of selegiline might improve fatigue, but could also produce cardiovascular side effects like increased heart rate and blood pressure and reportedly may be able to cause insomnia, euphoria, psychiatric disturbances, and psychosis. It is unknown what concentrations of levomethamphetamine and levoamphetamine produce sympathomimetic and other effects in humans and whether such concentrations are achieved with selegiline therapy. However, cardiovascular side effects of selegiline have been found clinically and have been attributed to its amphetamine metabolites. For comparison, rasagiline, which lacks amphetamine metabolites, has shown fewer adverse effects in clinical studies. Animal studies suggest that selegiline's amphetamine metabolites may indeed be involved in its effects, such as arousal, wakefulness, locomotor activity, and sympathomimetic effects.

Whereas the psychostimulants dextromethamphetamine and dextroamphetamine are relatively balanced releasers of dopamine and norepinephrine, levomethamphetamine is about 15- to 20-fold more potent in releasing norepinephrine relative to dopamine in vitro. Levomethamphetamine and levoamphetamine are similar to dextromethamphetamine and dextroamphetamine in their potencies as norepinephrine releasers in rodents in vivo. Conversely, levomethamphetamine is dramatically less potent as a dopamine releaser than dextromethamphetamine in vivo, whereas levoamphetamine is 3- to 5-fold less potent as a dopamine releaser compared to dextroamphetamine. Relatedly, levoamphetamine is substantially more potent as a dopamine releaser and stimulant than levomethamphetamine in rodents. In relation to the preceding findings, levomethamphetamine acts more as a selective norepinephrine releasing agent and levoamphetamine as an imbalanced and norepinephrine-preferring releasing agent of norepinephrine and dopamine than as balanced dual releasers of these catecholamine neurotransmitters. In accordance with the results of catecholamine release studies, levomethamphetamine is 2- to 10-fold or more less potent than dextromethamphetamine in terms of psychostimulant-like effects in rodents, whereas levoamphetamine is 1- to 4-fold less potent than dextroamphetamine in its stimulating and reinforcing effects in monkeys and humans.

In clinical studies, levomethamphetamine at oral doses of 1 to 10 mg has been found not to affect subjective drug responses, heart rate, blood pressure, core temperature, electrocardiography, respiration rate, oxygen saturation, or other clinical parameters. As such, doses of levomethamphetamine of less than or equal to 10 mg appear to have no significant physiological or subjective effects. However, higher doses of levomethamphetamine, for instance 0.25 to 0.5 mg/kg (mean doses of ~18–37 mg) intravenously, have been reported to produce significant pharmacological effects, including increased heart rate and blood pressure, increased respiration rate, and subjective effects like intoxication and drug liking. On the other hand, in contrast to dextroamphetamine and dextromethamphetamine, levomethamphetamine also produces subjective "bad" or aversive drug effects. Unlike the case of levomethamphetamine, oral doses of levoamphetamine of as low as 5 mg and above have been assessed and reported to produce significant pharmacological effects, for instance on wakefulness and mood. (Note: Smith & Davis (1977) reviewed 11 clinical studies of dextroamphetamine and levoamphetamine including doses and potency ratios in terms of a variety of psychological and behavioral effects. The summaries of these studies are in Table 1 of the paper.) With a 10 mg oral dose of selegiline, about 2 to 6 mg levomethamphetamine and 1 to 3 mg levoamphetamine is excreted in urine.

The amphetamine metabolites of selegiline being involved in its effectiveness in the treatment of Parkinson's disease has been deemed unlikely. High doses of levoamphetamine, for instance 50 mg/day, have been reported to be slightly effective in the treatment of Parkinson's disease. It has been postulated that amphetamines are limitedly effective for Parkinson's disease as there is inadequate presynaptic dopamine to be released in patients with the condition. In any case, this effectiveness of high doses of levoamphetamine could not be relevant to selegiline, which is administered at a dose of 10 mg/day. In one clinical study, levels of the amphetamine metabolites of selegiline were manipulated and there were no changes in clinical symptoms of Parkinson's disease. This led the researchers to conclude that the beneficial clinical effects of selegiline in Parkinson's disease were not due to its amphetamine metabolites. It is possible that there could be some small synergistic beneficial effect of selegiline with its amphetamine metabolites, but this has been considered improbable.

Methamphetamine is directly neurotoxic to dopaminergic neurons at high concentrations and doses. Such toxicity is unfavorable generally, but it is particularly concerning in the context of Parkinson's disease due to the potential for sufficiently high concentrations of methamphetamine to further exacerbate neurodegeneration along the nigrostriatal pathway. However, as previously described, levomethamphetamine is a significantly weaker monoamine releaser and psychostimulant than dextromethamphetamine. Circulating levels of levomethamphetamine associated with clinically relevant doses of selegiline are far lower than concentrations of racemic or dextrorotatory methamphetamine that are known to be neurotoxic to dopaminergic neurons. As such, dopaminergic neurotoxicity from selegiline's levomethamphetamine metabolite has been deemed unlikely.

Newer formulations of selegiline, such as the ODT and transdermal patch forms, have been developed which strongly reduce formation of the amphetamine metabolites and their associated effects. In addition, other MAO-B inhibitors that do not metabolize into amphetamines or monoamine releasing agents, like rasagiline and safinamide, have been developed and introduced.

=== Possible dopaminergic neuroprotection ===
Starting around the age of 45, dopamine content in the caudate nucleus decreases at a rate of about 13% per decade, and this neurodegeneration extends to the nigrostriatal dopaminergic pathway in general. This is a very high rate of neuronal decay relative to brain aging generally. Similarly, age-related decay of mesolimbic dopaminergic neurons as well as noradrenergic neurons is substantially slower than in the nigrostriatal pathway. Symptoms of Parkinson's disease are known to develop when the dopamine content of the caudate nucleus drops below 30% of the normal level. Loss of striatal dopamine reaches a level of 40% in healthy people by the age of 75, whereas in people with Parkinson's disease, the loss is around 70% at diagnosis and more than 90% at death. Only about 0.1% of the human population develops Parkinson's disease. In these individuals, the nigrostriatal pathway deteriorates more rapidly and prematurely than usual, for instance at a rate of 30 to 90% loss of dopamine content per decade. However, it is thought that if humans lived much longer than the average lifespan, everyone would eventually develop Parkinson's disease. Besides the nigrostriatal pathway, there is also considerable, albeit lesser, loss of dopaminergic neurons in people with Parkinson's disease in other pathways and areas, like the mesolimbic and mesocortical pathways. There is even substantial loss of dopamine in non-brain tissues, like the adrenal cortex and retina, implicating a generalized degeneration of the whole dopamine system.

The progressive loss of dopaminergic neurons in the nigrostriatal pathway as well as other areas has implications not only for motor control and risk of Parkinson's disease but also for cognition, emotion, learning, sexual activity, and other processes. Dopamine itself is thought to play a major role in this degeneration by metabolism into toxic metabolites that damage dopaminergic neurons. One form of this theory is the catecholaldehyde hypothesis, which specifically implicates 3,4-dihydroxyphenylacetaldehyde (DOPAL), a metabolite of dopamine formed by MAO, in this neurodegeneration. Age-related degeneration of nigrostriatal dopaminergic neurons is said to be similar in rodents and humans. Selegiline has been found to attenuate the age-related morphological changes in the nigrostriatal pathway of rodents and to produce accompanying preservations of cognitive and sexual functions. These protective effects may be mediated by multiple activities of selegiline including its MAO-B inhibition, its catecholaminergic activity enhancer effects, and other actions. According to József Knoll and Ildikó Miklya, two of the developers of selegiline, the drug may act as a neuroprotective and may be able to modestly slow the rate of age-related loss of dopamine signaling in humans. Knoll has advocated for the widespread use of a low dose of selegiline (1 mg/day or 10–15 mg/week) in the healthy population for such purposes and has used this himself. However, antiaging and anti-neurodegenerative effects of selegiline in humans have not been clearly demonstrated as of present and this theory remains to be substantiated.

=== Aldehyde dehydrogenase inhibition ===
The structurally related MAOI pargyline is a potent aldehyde dehydrogenase (ALDH) inhibitor and consequently is known to produce disulfiram-like alcohol intolerance reactions. The ALDH inhibition of pargyline is through formation of metabolites, including propiolaldehyde and propargylamine via its N-propargyl group. Propiolaldehyde and propargylamine are also theorized to be metabolites of selegiline, which likewise features an N-propargyl group. An animal study found that pargyline strongly inhibited the inactivation of acetaldehyde formed from ethanol whereas selegiline was only modestly effective in doing so (acetaldehyde levels elevated >20-fold versus >3-fold, respectively). These findings suggest that selegiline may indeed be a weak ALDH inhibitor. However, clinically significant ALDH inhibition and associated disulfiram-like alcohol intolerance with selegiline have not been reported. In addition, and relatedly, selegiline is used clinically at much lower doses (5–10 mg/day) than pargyline (12.5–200 mg/day). ALDH inhibition has notably been implicated in augmenting aging-related dopaminergic neurodegeneration by preventing the metabolism and detoxification of the toxic MAO-formed dopamine metabolite 3,4-dihydroxyphenylacetaldehyde (DOPAL). This compound is known to be a dopaminergic neurotoxin and has been implicated in the pathophysiology of Parkinson's disease.

=== Other actions ===
Selegiline has weak norepinephrine, dopamine, and serotonin-releasing effects, weakly blocks dopamine receptors, and weakly inhibits the reuptake of norepinephrine. However, these actions are largely of very low potency and are of questionable clinical significance. On the basis of positron emission tomography (PET) research with the ODT and patch formulations of selegiline, the drug does not significantly inhibit the brain dopamine transporter (DAT) in humans at clinical doses.

Selegiline shows relatively high affinity for (+)-3-PPP and ditolylguanidine (DTG)-labeled mouse sigma receptors (K_{i} = 287–2,100 nM).

Selegiline and its metabolite desmethylselegiline have been reported to directly bind to and inhibit glyceraldehyde-3-phosphate dehydrogenase (GAPDH). This might play a modulating role in the clinical effectiveness of selegiline for Parkinson's disease.

Unlike some of the hydrazine MAOIs like phenelzine and isocarboxazid, selegiline does not inhibit semicarbazide-sensitive amine oxidase (SSAO; also known as primary amine oxidase (PrAO) or as diamine oxidase (DAO)) nor does it pose a risk of vitamin B6 deficiency. As a result, selegiline does not have risks of the side effects of these actions.

Selegiline has been reported to inhibit several cytochrome P450 enzymes, including CYP2D6, CYP3A4/5, CYP2C19, CYP2B6, and CYP2A6.

== Pharmacokinetics ==
=== Absorption ===
Selegiline has an oral bioavailability of about 4 to 10%. The average time to peak levels of selegiline is 0.6 to 1.4 hours in different studies, with a range of about 0.5 to 1.5 hours in one study.

The circulating levels of selegiline and its metabolites following a single 10 mg oral dose have been studied. The metabolites of selegiline include desmethylselegiline, levomethamphetamine, and levoamphetamine. The average peak concentrations of selegiline across several studies ranged from 0.84 ± 0.6 μg/L to 2.2 ± 1.2 μg/L and the AUC levels ranged from 1.26 ± 1.19 μg⋅h/L to 2.17 ± 2.59 μg⋅h/L. In the case of desmethylselegiline, the time to peak has been reported to be 0.8 ± 0.2 hours, the peak levels were 7.84 ± 2.11 μg/L to 13.4 ± 3.2 μg/L, and the area-under-the-curve (AUC) levels were 15.05 ± 4.37 μg⋅h/L to 40.3 ± 10.7 μg⋅h/L. For levomethamphetamine, the peak levels were 10.2 ± 1.5 μg/L and the AUC levels were 150.2 ± 21.6 μg⋅h/L, whereas for levoamphetamine, the peak levels were 3.6 ± 2.9 μg/L and the AUC levels were 61.7 ± 44.0 μg⋅h/L. For comparison, following a single 10 mg oral dose of dextromethamphetamine or dextroamphetamine, peak levels of these agents have been reported to range from 14 to 90 μg/L and from 15 to 34 μg/L, respectively. Time to peak for levomethamphetamine has been reported to be 0.75 to 6 hours and for levoamphetamine has been reported to be 2.5 to 12 hours in people with different CYP2D6 metabolizer phenotypes. Levels of desmethylselegiline, levomethamphetamine, and levoamphetamine are 4- to almost 20-fold higher than maximal selegiline levels with oral selegiline therapy.

With repeated administration of selegiline, there is an accumulation of selegiline and its metabolites. With a dosage of 10 mg once a day or 5 mg twice daily, peak levels of selegiline were 1.59 ± 0.89 μg/L to 2.33 ± 1.76 μg/L and AUC levels of selegiline were 6.92 ± 5.39 μg⋅h/L to 7.84 ± 5.43 μg⋅h/L after 1 week of treatment. This equated to a 1.9- to 2.6-fold accumulation in peak levels and a 3.6- to 5.5-fold accumulation in AUC levels. The metabolites of selegiline accumulate to a smaller extent than selegiline. The AUC levels of desmethylselegiline increased by 1.5-fold and the peak and AUC levels of levomethamphetamine and levoamphetamine increased by 2-fold following 1 week of treatment with selegiline. Selegiline appears to inhibit its own metabolism and that of desmethylselegiline with continuous use.

The oral bioavailability of selegiline increases when it is ingested together with a fatty meal, as the molecule is fat-soluble. There is a 3-fold increase in peak levels of selegiline and a 5-fold increase in AUC levels when it is taken orally with food. The elimination half-life of selegiline is unchanged when it is taken with food. In contrast to selegiline itself, the pharmacokinetics of its metabolites, desmethylselegililne, levomethamphetamine, and levoamphetamine, are unchanged when selegiline is taken with food.

=== Distribution ===
The apparent volume of distribution of selegiline is 1,854 ± 824 L. Selegiline and its metabolites rapidly cross the blood–brain barrier and enter the brain, where they are most concentrated in the thalamus, basal ganglia, midbrain, and cingulate gyrus. Selegiline especially accumulates in brain areas with high MAO-B content, such as the thalamus, striatum, cortex, and brainstem. Concentrations of selegiline's metabolites in cerebrospinal fluid (CSF) are similar to those in blood, suggesting that accumulation in the brain over peripheral tissues does not occur.

No data were originally available on the plasma protein binding of selegiline. It has been stated that the plasma protein binding of selegiline is 94%, but it has been said that there is no actual evidence to support this figure. Subsequent research found that its plasma protein binding is 85 to 90%.

=== Metabolism ===
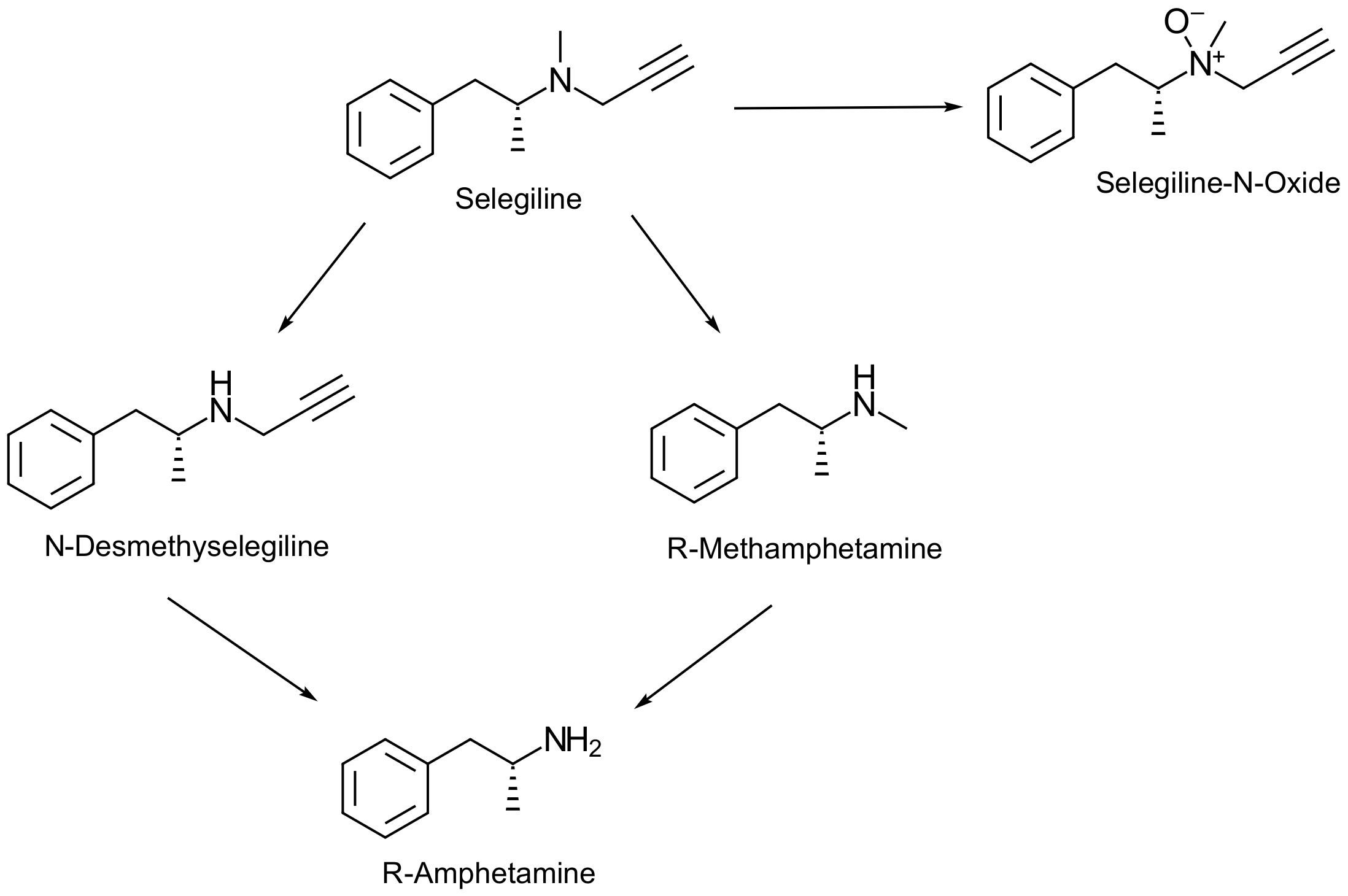
Metabolism of selegiline. (R)-Methamphetamine (levomethamphetamine) and (R)-amphetamine (levoamphetamine) are not extensively metabolized and are excreted substantially unchanged so their metabolic profiles are omitted.

Selegiline is metabolized in the intestines, liver, and other tissues. More than 90% of orally administered selegiline is metabolized prior to reaching the bloodstream due to strong first-pass metabolism. Selegiline (L-N-propargylmethamphetamine) is metabolized by N-demethylation into levomethamphetamine and by N-depropargylation into desmethylselegiline (L-N-propargylamphetamine). Subsequently, levomethamphetamine is further metabolized into levoamphetamine by N-demethylation and desmethylselegiline is further metabolized into levoamphetamine by N-depropargylation. Levomethamphetamine, levoamphetamine, and desmethylselegiline constitute the three major or primary metabolites of selegiline. No racemization occurs in the metabolism of selegiline or its metabolites; that is, the levorotatory enantiomers are not converted into the dextrorotatory enantiomers, such as D-deprenyl, dextromethamphetamine, or dextroamphetamine. Following their formation, the amphetamine metabolites of selegiline are also metabolized via hydroxylation and then conjugation via glucuronidation. Besides the preceding metabolites, selegiline-N-oxide and formaldehyde are also known to be formed. More than 40 minor metabolites of selegiline have been either detected or proposed. Due to the amphetamine metabolites of selegiline, people taking selegiline may test positive for "amphetamine" or "methamphetamine" on drug screening tests.

The exact cytochrome P450 enzymes responsible for the metabolism of selegiline have not been fully elucidated. CYP2B6, CYP2C9, and CYP3A are thought to be significantly involved in the metabolism of selegiline on the basis of in vitro studies. Other cytochrome P450 enzymes, including CYP1A2, CYP2A6, CYP2C8, CYP2D6, CYP2C19, and CYP2E1, may also be involved. One review concluded that CYP2B6 and CYP2C19 are the leading candidates in selegiline metabolism. CYP2B6 is thought to N-demethylate selegiline into desmethylselegiline and CYP2B6 and CYP2C19 are thought to N-depropargylate selegiline into levomethamphetamine. Additionally, CYP2B6 and CYP2C19 are thought to metabolize desmethylselegiline into levoamphetamine and CYP2B6 is thought to N-demethylate levomethamphetamine into levoamphetamine. CYP2D6 and CYP2C19 metabolizer phenotypes did not significantly affect the pharmacokinetics of selegiline, suggesting that these enzymes are minimally involved in its metabolism. However, although most pharmacokinetic variables were unaffected, AUC levels of levomethamphetamine were 46% higher and its elimination half-life 33% longer in CYP2D6 poor metabolizers compared to extensive metabolizers and desmethylselegiline AUC levels were 68% higher in CYP2C19 poor metabolizers compared to extensive metabolizers. As with CYP2D6 and CYP2C19, CYP3A4 and CYP3A5 are unlikely to be majorly involved in the metabolism of selegiline as the strong inhibitor itraconazole has minimal impact on its pharmacokinetics.

=== Elimination ===
Selegiline administered orally is recovered 87% in urine and 15% in feces as the unchanged parent drug and its metabolites. Of selegiline excreted in urine, 20 to 63% is excreted as levomethamphetamine, 9 to 26% as levoamphetamine, 1% as desmethylselegiline, and 0.01 to 0.03% at unchanged selegiline. In the case of levomethamphetamine and levoamphetamine, with an oral dose of 10 mg selegiline, this would be amounts of about 2 to 6 mg levomethamphetamine and about 1 to 3 mg levoamphetamine. The near-absence of unchanged excreted selegiline indicates that selegiline is essentially completely metabolized prior to its excretion.

The average elimination half-life of selegiline after a single oral dose ranges from 1.2 to 1.9 hours across studies. With repeated administration, the half-life of selegiline increases to 7.7 ± 12.6 hours to 9.6 ± 13.6 hours. The elimination half-life of selegiline's metabolite, desmethylselegiline, has been reported to range from 2.2 ± 0.6 hours to 3.8 hours. The half-lives of its metabolites levomethamphetamine and levoamphetamine have been reported to be 14 hours and 16 hours, respectively. In another study, their half-lives were 11.6 to 15.4 hours and 17.0 to 18.1 hours, respectively, in people with different CYP2D6 metabolizer phenotypes. Following repeated administration, the half-life of desmethylselegiline increased from 3.8 hours with the first dose to 9.5 hours following 1 week of daily selegiline doses. Selegiline is a known inhibitor of several cytochrome P450 enzymes, such as CYP2B6 and CYP2A6. It appears to inhibit its own metabolism and the metabolism of its metabolite desmethylselegiline.

The oral clearance of selegiline is 59.4 ± 43.7 L/min. This is described as very high and as almost 30-fold higher than hepatic blood flow. The renal clearance of selegiline is 0.0072 L/h and is very low compared to its oral clearance. These findings suggest that selegiline is extensively metabolized not only by the liver but also by non-hepatic tissues.

=== Orally disintegrating tablet ===
Selegiline as an orally disintegrating tablet (ODT) is absorbed primarily buccally instead of being swallowed orally. It was found to have 5- to 8-fold higher bioavailability, more consistent blood levels, and to produce fewer amphetamine metabolites than the standard oral tablet form. It achieves blood levels of selegiline at a dose of 1.25 mg/day that are similar to those with conventional oral selegiline at a dose of 10 mg/day. In addition, there is an at least 90% reduction in metabolites of selegiline including desmethylselegiline, levomethamphetamine, and levoamphetamine with the ODT formulation of selegiline compared to conventional oral selegiline. Hence, levels of these metabolites are 10-fold lower with the ODT formulation. The levels of amphetamine metabolites with the ODT formulation have been regarded as negligible. This formulation of selegiline retains selectivity for MAO-B over MAO-A and likewise does not cause the "cheese effect" with consumption of tyramine-rich foods.

=== Transdermal patch ===
The selegiline transdermal patch is indicated for application to the upper torso, upper thigh, or the outer upper arm once every 24 hours. With application, an average of 25 to 30% (range 10 to 14%) of the selegiline content of the patch is delivered systemically over 24 hours. This equates to about 0.3 mg selegiline per cm^{2} over 24 hours. The patch has approximately 75% bioavailability, compared to 4 to 10% with the conventional oral form. Transdermal selegiline results in significantly higher exposure to selegiline and lower exposure to all metabolites compared to conventional oral selegiline. Selegiline levels are 50-fold higher and exposure to its metabolites 70% lower with the transdermal patch compared to oral administration at equivalent doses. These differences are due to extensive first-pass metabolism with the oral form and the bypassing and absence of the first pass with the patch form. Selegiline absorption and levels have been found to be equivalent when applied to the upper torso versus the upper thigh. The drug does not accumulate in skin and is not significantly metabolized in skin.

=== Hepatic and renal impairment ===
The United States drug label for oral selegiline states that no information is available on this formulation of the drug in the context of hepatic or renal impairment. Conversely, the transdermal patch drug label states that no pharmacokinetic differences in selegiline and its metabolites were observed in mild or moderate liver impairment nor in mild, moderate, or severe renal impairment. As such, the label states that dosage adjustment is not needed in these contexts. Severe hepatic impairment and end-stage renal impairment were not studied. In the case of the ODT formulation of selegiline, its drug label states that the dosage of selegiline should be reduced in mild and moderate hepatic impairment, whereas no dosage adjustment is required in mild to moderate renal impairment. The label additionally states that ODT selegiline is not recommended in severe hepatic impairment nor in severe or end-stage renal impairment. In clinical studies described by the ODT label, selegiline exposure was 1.5-fold higher and desmethylselegiline exposure 1.4-fold higher in mild hepatic impairment, selegiline exposure was 1.5-fold higher and desmethylselegiline exposure 1.8-fold higher in moderate hepatic impairment, and selegiline exposure was 4-fold higher and desmethylselegiline exposure 1.25-fold higher in severe hepatic impairment. Conversely, levomethamphetamine and levoamphetamine exposures were not modified by hepatic impairment. In the case of renal impairment, selegiline and desmethylselegiline levels were not substantially different in mild and moderate renal impairment and selegiline levels were likewise not substantially different in end-stage renal impairment. However, levomethamphetamine and levoamphetamine exposures were increased by 34 to 67% in moderate renal impairment and by approximately 4-fold in end-stage renal impairment.

In a published clinical study, hepatic and renal function were reported to more dramatically influence the pharmacokinetics of selegiline in the case of oral selegiline. The pharmacokinetics of selegiline's major metabolites, desmethylselegiline, levomethamphetamine, and levoamphetamine, were also affected, but to a much lesser extent compared to selegiline itself. AUC levels of selegiline relative to normal control subjects were 18-fold higher in people with hepatic impairment, 23-fold lower in people with drug-induced liver dysfunction, and 6-fold higher in people with renal impairment. The drug-induced liver dysfunction group consisted of people taking a variety of anticonvulsants, including phenobarbital, phenytoin, carbamazepine, and amobarbital, that are known to strongly activate drug-metabolizing enzymes. However, in a previous study, carbamazepine specifically did not reduce selegiline exposure. Phenobarbital and certain other anticonvulsants are known to strongly induce CYP2B6, one of the major enzymes thought to be involved in the metabolism of selegiline, and it was concluded by the study authors that induction of this enzyme was the most likely explanation of the dramatically reduced exposure to selegiline in the drug-induced liver dysfunction group. Because of these increased exposures, subsequent literature reviews citing the study have stated that selegiline (route/form not specified) is not recommended in people with moderate or severe liver impairment or with renal impairment.
