= 3-F-BPAP =

Monoaminergic activity enhancer antagonist

Clinical data
- Other names: Trifluoro-BPAP; Trifluoro-benzofuranylpropylaminopentane
- Drug class: Monoaminergic activity enhancer antagonist

Identifiers
- IUPAC name: 1-(1-benzofuran-2-yl)-N-(3,3,3-trifluoropropyl)pentan-2-amine
- CAS Number: 501901-68-4 501901-69-5 (HCl)
- PubChem CID: 10125543
- ChemSpider: 8301062

Chemical and physical data
- Formula: C_{16}H_{20}F_{3}NO
- Molar mass: 299.337 g·mol^{−1}
- 3D model (JSmol): Interactive image
- SMILES: CCCC(CC1=CC2=CC=CC=C2O1)NCCC(F)(F)F
- InChI: InChI=1S/C16H20F3NO/c1-2-5-13(20-9-8-16(17,18)19)11-14-10-12-6-3-4-7-15(12)21-14/h3-4,6-7,10,13,20H,2,5,8-9,11H2,1H3; Key:JCZRCOLYSDAPPW-UHFFFAOYSA-N

3-F-BPAP is a trifluorinated derivative of benzofuranylpropylaminopentane (BPAP) and is an antagonist of the monoaminergic activity enhancer (MAE) effects of the tryptamine-related BPAP.

Conversely, 3-F-BPAP does not antagonize the catecholaminergic activity enhancer (CAE) effects of the phenethylamine-derived selegiline (L-deprenyl) and phenylpropylaminopentane (PPAP). This suggests that different MAEs like BPAP and selegiline may not be identical in their actions and might be acting via different receptor subtypes. In contrast to 3-F-BPAP however, the TAAR1 antagonist EPPTB antagonizes the MAE effects of both BPAP and selegiline.

3-F-BPAP has a weak MAE effect itself but with much lower potency than BPAP. The effects of MAEs like BPAP and selegiline appear to be mediated by TAAR1 agonism, and hence 3-F-BPAP may be acting as a TAAR1 antagonist (or weak partial agonist).

3-F-BPAP was developed by József Knoll and colleagues and was first described in the scientific literature in 2002.

== See also ==
- Substituted benzofuran
