= Naphthylpropylaminopentane =

NPAP

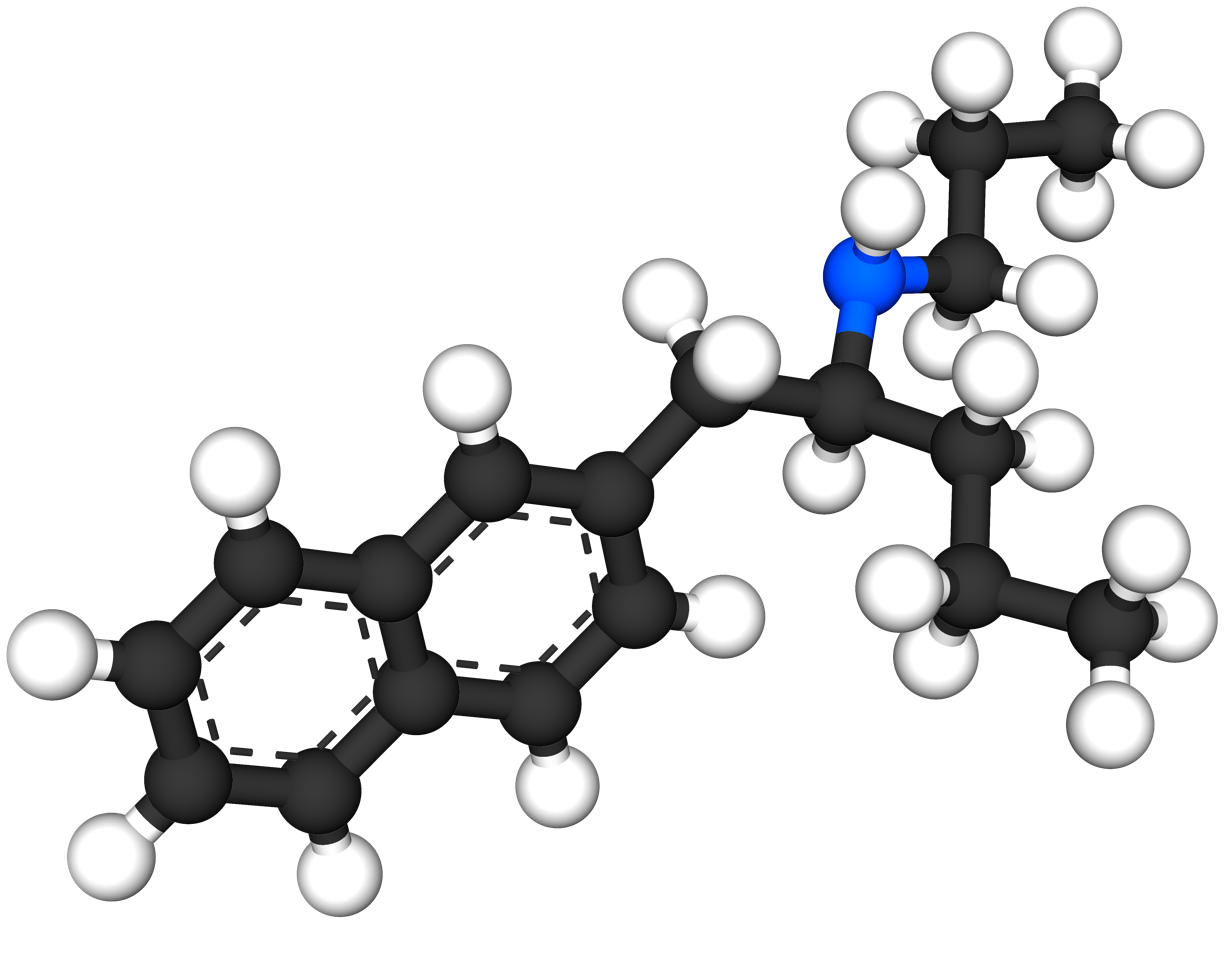

Clinical data
- Other names: 1-(2-Naphthyl)-2-propylaminopentane; NPAP; 2-Naphthyl-α,N-dipropylphenethylamine
- Drug class: Monoaminergic activity enhancer
- ATC code: None

Identifiers
- IUPAC name: 1-naphthalen-2-yl-N-propylpentan-2-amine
- PubChem CID: 9926059
- ChemSpider: 8101694

Chemical and physical data
- Formula: C_{18}H_{25}N
- Molar mass: 255.405 g·mol^{−1}
- 3D model (JSmol): Interactive image
- SMILES: CCCC(CC1=CC2=CC=CC=C2C=C1)NCCC
- InChI: InChI=1S/C18H25N/c1-3-7-18(19-12-4-2)14-15-10-11-16-8-5-6-9-17(16)13-15/h5-6,8-11,13,18-19H,3-4,7,12,14H2,1-2H3; Key:GKNKHAOHVXOYDS-UHFFFAOYSA-N

1-(2-Naphthyl)-2-propylaminopentane (NPAP), also known as 2-naphthyl-α,N-dipropylphenethylamine, is a monoaminergic activity enhancer (MAE) of the α-propylphenethylamine and naphthylaminopropane families related to phenylpropylaminopentane (PPAP). It is the analogue of PPAP in which the phenyl ring has been replaced with a naphthalene ring. MAEs are agents that enhance the action potential-mediated release of monoamine neurotransmitters. NPAP is a MAE of norepinephrine and dopamine but not of serotonin. Its potency is similar to that of PPAP. As with PPAP, the (–)-enantiomer of NPAP is more potent as a MAE. Like PPAP, it is inactive as a classical monoamine releasing agent. NPAP was developed by József Knoll and colleagues and was first described in 2001.

== See also ==
- Substituted naphthylethylamine
- Substituted α-propylphenethylamine
- Methylenedioxyphenylpropylaminopentane (MPAP)
- Benzofuranylpropylaminopentane (BPAP)
- Indolylpropylaminopentane (IPAP)
- Naphthylaminopropane
- Ethylnaphthylaminopropane
- Naphyrone (naphthylpyrovalerone)
- Ethylnaphthidate (HDEP-28)
- Methylnaphthidate (HDMP-28)
