= Benzofuranylpropylaminopentane =

Chemical compound

BPAP

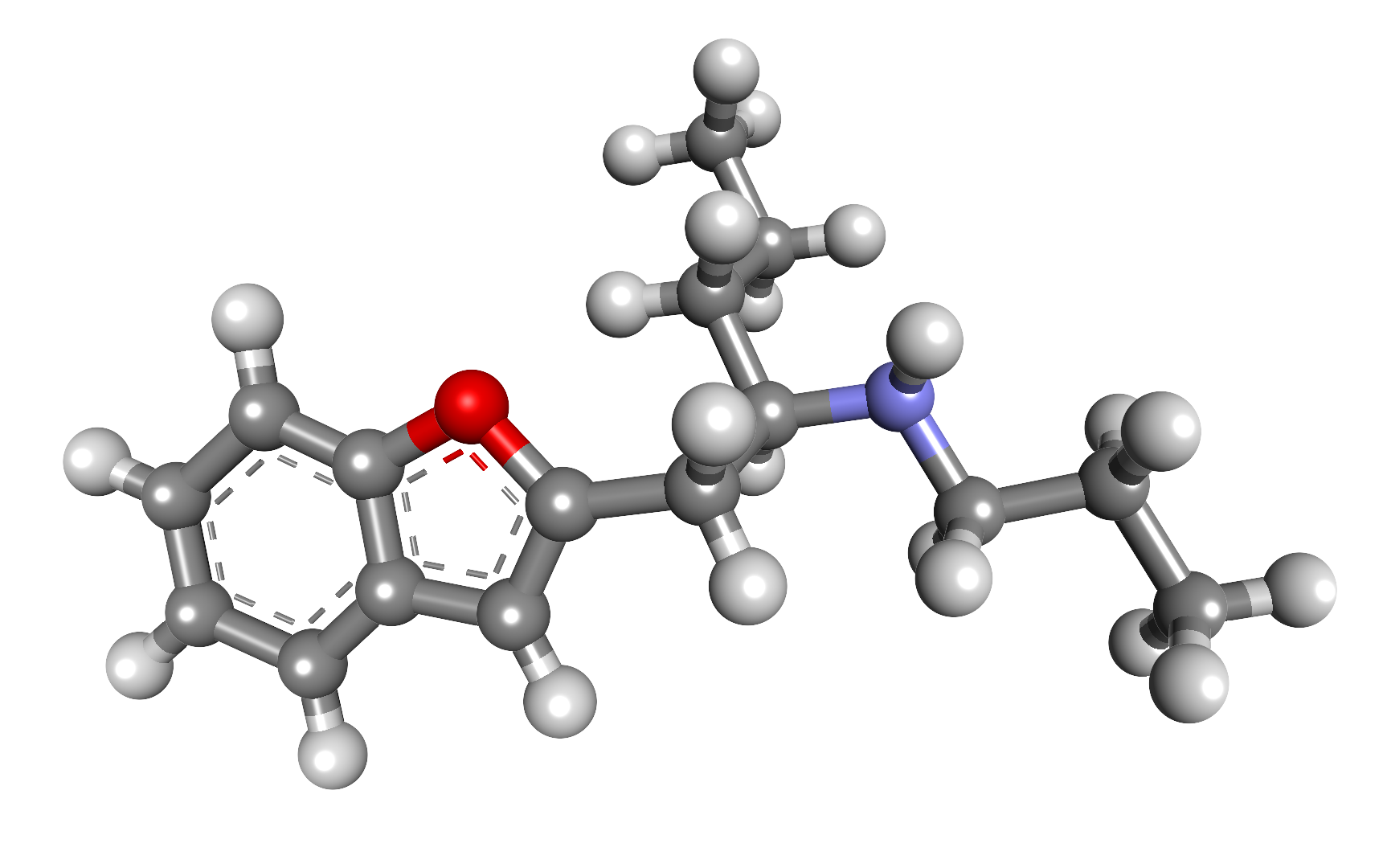

Clinical data
- Other names: (–)-1-(Benzofuran-2-yl)-2-propylaminopentane; (–)-BPAP; R-(–)-BPAP; BFPAPn; BFPAP; (αR)-N,α-Dipropyl-2-benzofuranethanamine; FPFS-1169
- Routes of administration: By mouth
- Drug class: Monoaminergic activity enhancer

Identifiers
- IUPAC name: (2R)-1-(1-Benzofuran-2-yl)-N-propylpentan-2-amine; (-)-BPAP; BFPAPn; BFPAP
- CAS Number: 260550-89-8
- PubChem CID: 9859674
- ChemSpider: 7992053
- UNII: 5XG5HU8U55

Chemical and physical data
- Formula: C_{16}H_{23}NO
- Molar mass: 245.366 g·mol^{−1}
- 3D model (JSmol): Interactive image
- SMILES: CCC[C@@H](NCCC)CC1=CC2=C(C=CC=C2)O1
- InChI: InChI=1S/C16H23NO/c1-3-7-14(17-10-4-2)12-15-11-13-8-5-6-9-16(13)18-15/h5-6,8-9,11,14,17H,3-4,7,10,12H2,1-2H3/t14-/m1/s1; Key:LJHIBIVAYHQPBT-CQSZACIVSA-N

(–)-Benzofuranylpropylaminopentane (BPAP; developmental code name FPFS-1169) is an experimental drug related to selegiline which acts as a monoaminergic activity enhancer (MAE). It is orally active in animals.

BPAP is a highly potent MAE and enhances the nerve impulse propagation-mediated release of serotonin, norepinephrine, and dopamine. At much higher concentrations, BPAP is also a monoamine reuptake inhibitor, specifically of dopamine and norepinephrine and to a much lesser extent of serotonin. BPAP produces psychostimulant-like effects in animals, with these effects mediated by its MAE actions. The drug is a substituted benzofuran derivative and tryptamine relative structurally related to phenylpropylaminopentane (PPAP).

BPAP was first described in 1999. There has been interest in BPAP for potential clinical use in humans, including in the treatment of Parkinson's disease, Alzheimer's disease, and depression. There has also been interest in BPAP to help slow aging.

== Pharmacology ==
=== Pharmacodynamics ===
==== Monoaminergic activity enhancer ====
BPAP is a monoaminergic activity enhancer (MAE). It stimulates the impulse propagation mediated release of the monoamine neurotransmitters serotonin, dopamine, and norepinephrine in the brain. However, whereas the related MAE phenylpropylaminopentane (PPAP) is only a catecholaminergic activity enhancer (CAE), BPAP enhances both serotonin and the catecholamines. In addition, BPAP is a more potent MAE than PPAP.

Unlike psychostimulants like amphetamine, which are monoamine releasing agents that induce release of a flood of monoamine neurotransmitters in an uncontrolled manner, BPAP instead only increases the amount of neurotransmitter that is released when a neuron is stimulated by receiving an impulse from a neighbouring neuron. As such, while both amphetamine and BPAP increase the amount of neurotransmitters that are released, amphetamine causes neurons to dump neurotransmitter stores into the synapse regardless of external input, while with BPAP the pattern of neurotransmitter release is not changed. Instead, when the neuron would normally release neurotransmitter, a larger amount than normal is released with BPAP.

In an in vivo rodent study, BPAP was found to maximally increase dopamine levels in the striatum by 44%, in the substantia nigra by 118%, and in the olfactory tubercle by 57%; norepinephrine levels in the locus coeruleus by 228%; and serotonin levels in the raphe nucleus by 166%. MAEs, including BPAP, have a peculiar and characteristic bimodal concentration–response relationship, with two bell-shaped curves of MAE activity across tested concentration ranges. Hence, there is a narrow concentration range for optimal pharmacodynamic activity.

The actions of BPAP and other MAEs are distinct from those of monoamine reuptake inhibitors and monoamine oxidase inhibitors. Whereas BPAP enhances the nerve stimulation-induced release of serotonin, norepinephrine, and dopamine in the rat brain stem in vitro, the selective norepinephrine reuptake inhibitor desipramine (desmethylimipramine), the selective serotonin reuptake inhibitor fluoxetine, the selective MAO-A inhibitor clorgyline, the selective MAO-B inhibitor lazabemide, and the potent dopamine receptor agonists bromocriptine and pergolide were all ineffective.

Findings in the early 2020s have suggested that known synthetic MAEs like BPAP may exert their effects via trace amine-associated receptor 1 (TAAR1) agonism. This was evidenced by the TAAR1 antagonist EPPTB reversing its MAE effects, among other findings. Another compound, rasagiline, has likewise been found to reverse the effects of MAEs, and has been proposed as a possible TAAR1 antagonist. The MAE effects of BPAP, for instance on dopamine, can be blocked by monoamine reuptake inhibitors like nomifensine. This is thought to be because BPAP uses monoamine transporters like the dopamine transporter to enter monoaminergic neurons and then mediates its MAE effects via intracellular TAAR1 activation whilst inside of pre-synaptic nerve terminals.

Other compounds which produce MAE effects are the endogenous trace amines phenethylamine and tryptamine, the MAO-B inhibitor selegiline (L-deprenyl), and phenylpropylaminopentane (PPAP). However, BPAP is the most potent MAE known, with 130 times the in vivo potency of selegiline, in vitro activity at concentrations in the femtomolar to picomolar range, and in vivo activity at microgram doses.

BPAP increases locomotor activity, a measure of psychostimulant-like effect, in normal rats, and reverses hypolocomotion in reserpine-treated rats. These effects are reversed by the dopamine D_{1} receptor antagonist SCH-23390 but not by the dopamine D_{2} receptor antagonist sulpiride, suggesting that they are mediated by the dopaminergic system. Unlike amphetamines, but similarly to selegiline, BPAP is not expected to have misuse potential. BPAP antagonizes tetrabenazine-induced inhibition of learning in the shuttle box. It has been found to have neuroprotective effects similar to those of selegiline in some animal models. Following a peak in adolescence, monoamine release in the brain declines with age in rodents and this is associated with reduced behavioral activity. Rodent studies have found that MAEs like BPAP and selegiline augment brain monoamine release, slow age-related monoaminergic neurodegeneration, help to preserve behavioral activity with age, and prolong lifespan.

==== Other actions ====
In addition to its MAE actions, BPAP is a monoamine reuptake inhibitor at higher concentrations. Its IC_{50} values in terms of binding affinity for the dopamine transporter, norepinephrine transporter, and serotonin transporter were 16 nM, 211 nM, and 638 nM, respectively. Conversely, its IC_{50} values for inhibition of dopamine, norepinephrine, and serotonin reuptake were 42 nM, 52 nM, and 640 nM, respectively. The drug has no classical monoamine releasing agent actions, in contrast to amphetamines. It has been said that the monoamine reuptake inhibition of BPAP is not of pharmacological significance at the much lower concentrations that have MAE activity.

While selegiline is a potent monoamine oxidase inhibitor (MAOI), BPAP is only a weak MAO-A inhibitor at high concentrations, and at low concentrations produces only MAE effects. It is 10,000-fold less potent than the potent MAO-A inhibitor clorgyline in terms of MAO-A inhibition. The weak MAO-A inhibition of BPAP is said to be without pharmacological significance. BPAP has relatively weak affinity for the α_{2}-adrenergic receptor. However, this occurs at concentrations well above its MAE actions. The drug is also a weak agonist of the sigma receptor likewise at high concentrations.

=== Pharmacokinetics ===
The pharmacokinetics of BPAP have been studied in rodents. It is well-absorbed with parenteral and oral routes and shows substantial oral bioavailability. Peak levels are reached within 30 to 60 minutes. There is a second peak after 4 hours due to enterohepatic circulation. It crosses the blood–brain barrier and distributes into various brain areas. The drug is not metabolized by monoamine oxidase. BPAP is preferentially eliminated in urine and to a lesser extent in feces. Its elimination half-life was 5.5 to 5.8 hours. The drug is recovered more than 90% in urine and feces 72 hours after administration.

== Chemistry ==
(R)-BPAP chemical structure.

BPAP (1-(benzofuran-2-yl)-2-propylaminopentane) is a substituted benzofuran derivative and tryptamine relative and was derived from structural modification of phenylpropylaminopentane (PPAP). It was developed by replacement of the benzene ring in PPAP with a benzofuran ring.

The compound is generally studied and used as the R(–)-enantiomer, R(–)-BPAP or simply (–)-BPAP (FPFS-1169). This enantiomer is more potent than the S(+)-enantiomer (FPFS-1170).

Indolylpropylaminopentane (IPAP), an analogue of BPAP, is a MAE for serotonin, norepinephrine, and dopamine that was derived from tryptamine. Unlike BPAP, it shows some selectivity for serotonin, with its maximal impact on this neurotransmitter occurring at 10-fold lower concentrations than for norepinephrine or dopamine.

A derivative of BPAP, 3-F-BPAP, has weak MAE activity and has been found to antagonize the MAE actions of BPAP. These findings suggest that 3-F-BPAP interacts with the same receptor or biological target as BPAP and acts as a MAE antagonist.

Enantioselective synthesis of (–)-BPAP has been described.

== History ==
BPAP was first described in the scientific literature in 1999. It was derived via structural modification of phenylpropylaminopentane (PPAP). It was discovered by the developers of selegiline, including József Knoll and colleagues like Ildikó Miklya. PPAP had previously been derived by modification of selegiline.

== Research ==
BPAP has been studied in preclinical research for potential treatment of Alzheimer's disease, Parkinson's disease, depression, and aging. It has been found to be active in multiple animal models of antidepressant action. It also attenuates reinstatement of methamphetamine-seeking behavior in rodents. The drug has been proposed for potential clinical development for use in humans. An effective dosage of BPAP of 0.1 mg/day, one-tenth of that of the less-potent compound selegiline (1 mg/day), has been suggested for study and use in humans.

== See also ==
- Substituted benzofuran
- Methylenedioxyphenylpropylaminopentane (MPAP)
- Naphthylpropylaminopentane (NPAP)
