= MPAP =

MPAP may refer to:

- Mean pulmonary artery pressure (mPAP)
- Methylenedioxypropylaminopentane (MPAP)
