= Indolylpropylaminopentane =

Synthetic monoaminergic activity enhancer drug

IPAP

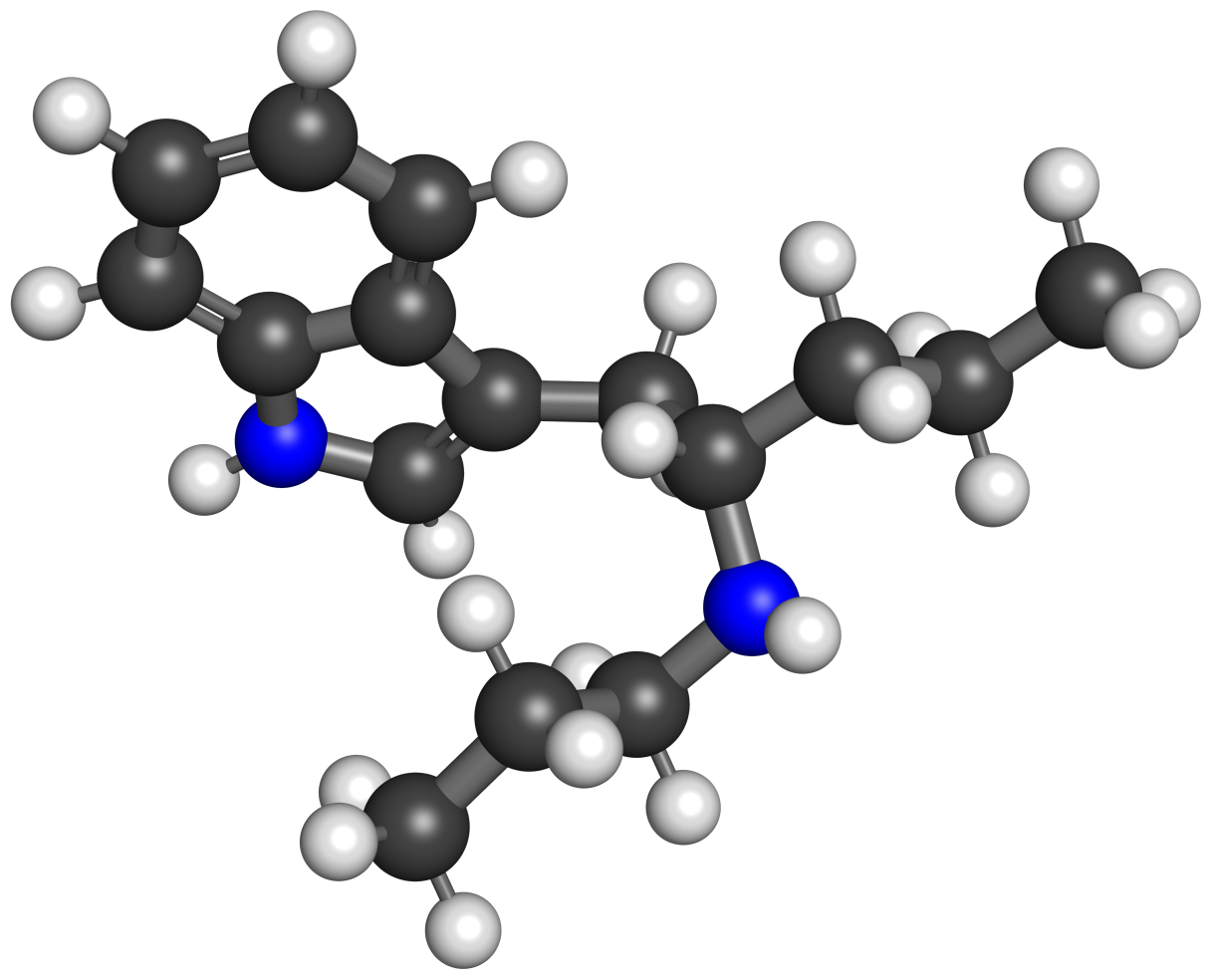

Clinical data
- Other names: IPAP; 1-(Indol-3-yl)-2-propylaminopentane; α,N-Dipropyltryptamine, α,N-DPT
- Drug class: Monoaminergic activity enhancer

Identifiers
- IUPAC name: 1-(1H-indol-3-yl)-N-propylpentan-2-amine
- CAS Number: 220491-98-5
- PubChem CID: 22007056

Chemical and physical data
- Formula: C_{16}H_{24}N_{2}
- Molar mass: 244.382 g·mol^{−1}
- 3D model (JSmol): Interactive image
- SMILES: CCCC(CC1=CNC2=CC=CC=C21)NCCC
- InChI: InChI=1S/C16H24N2/c1-3-7-14(17-10-4-2)11-13-12-18-16-9-6-5-8-15(13)16/h5-6,8-9,12,14,17-18H,3-4,7,10-11H2,1-2H3; Key:OQTWGSLVDILQOQ-UHFFFAOYSA-N

Indolylpropylaminopentane (IPAP), also known as α,N-dipropyltryptamine (α,N-DPT), is a monoaminergic activity enhancer (MAE) that is closely related to benzofuranylpropylaminopentane (BPAP) and phenylpropylaminopentane (PPAP). It is a tryptamine derivative and the corresponding analogue of PPAP and BPAP with an indole ring instead of a benzene ring or benzofuran ring, respectively. IPAP is also a positional isomer of N,N-dipropyltryptamine (N,N-DPT).

MAEs are agents that enhance the action potential-mediated release of monoamine neurotransmitters. IPAP is a MAE of serotonin, norepinephrine, and dopamine. However, IPAP acts preferentially as a MAE of serotonin and is about 10-fold more potent in enhancing serotonin than in enhancing norepinephrine or dopamine. This is in contrast to BPAP, which is of similar potency as a MAE of serotonin and the catecholamines. It is also in contrast to PPAP and selegiline, which act exclusively as catecholaminergic activity enhancers (CAEs) and do not enhance serotonin. Hence, IPAP is a representative selective serotonergic activity enhancer (SAE) at lower doses.

IPAP is more potent as a MAE than PPAP and selegiline but is less potent than BPAP. As with BPAP and PPAP, the negative enantiomer (i.e., R(–)-IPAP) is more biologically active as a MAE and is often the employed compound. The effects of MAEs appear to be mediated by intracellular TAAR1 agonism coupled with uptake by monoamine transporters into monoaminergic neurons.

In contrast to amphetamines, IPAP has no classical monoamine releasing agent actions. It is a weak MAO-A inhibitor similarly to BPAP at high doses.

IPAP was first described in the scientific literature in 2001, following BPAP in 1999. It was discovered by József Knoll and colleagues.

== See also ==
- Substituted α-alkyltryptamine
- Methylenedioxyphenylpropylaminopentane (MPAP)
- Naphthylpropylaminopentane (NPAP)
- α-Propyltryptamine (APT; αPT)
- α,N-Dimethyltryptamine (α,N-DMT)
