= Methylenedioxyphenylpropylaminopentane =

MPAP

Clinical data
- Other names: 1-(3,4-Methylenedioxyphenyl)-2-propylaminopentane; MPAP; 3,4-Methylenedioxy-α,N-dipropylphenethylamine; 3,4-Methylenedioxy-PPAP; MDPPAP; N-Propyl-1,3-benzodioxolylpentanamine; PBDP; Propyl-K
- Drug class: Monoaminergic activity enhancer

Chemical and physical data
- Formula: C_{15}H_{25}NO_{2}
- Molar mass: 251.370 g·mol^{−1}
- 3D model (JSmol): Interactive image
- SMILES: CCCNC(CCC)CC1=CC2OCOC2C=C1
- InChI: InChI=1S/C15H25NO2/c1-3-5-13(16-8-4-2)9-12-6-7-14-15(10-12)18-11-17-14/h6-7,10,13-16H,3-5,8-9,11H2,1-2H3; Key:MXDWJUBNNVFKKO-UHFFFAOYSA-N

1-(3,4-Methylenedioxyphenyl)-2-propylaminopentane (MPAP), also known as 3,4-methylenedioxy-α,N-dipropylphenethylamine, N-propyl-1,3-benzodioxolylpentanamine (PDBP), or propyl-K, is a monoaminergic activity enhancer (MAE) of the phenethylamine, amphetamine, and α-propylphenethylamine families that is closely related to phenylpropylaminopentane (PPAP). It is an analogue of PPAP and benzofuranylpropylaminopentane (BPAP) with a benzodioxole ring instead of a phenyl or benzofuran ring, respectively.

MAEs are agents that enhance the action potential-mediated release of monoamine neurotransmitters. MPAP is a MAE of serotonin, norepinephrine, and dopamine, all with similar potency. This is similar to BPAP, but is in contrast to PPAP and selegiline, which act exclusively as catecholaminergic activity enhancers (CAEs) and do not enhance serotonin. Like PPAP and BPAP, but in contrast to amphetamines, MPAP has no classical monoamine releasing agent actions.

MPAP has comparable potency to PPAP and selegiline as a MAE in terms of enhancing the monoamine neurotransmitters in the isolated rat brain stem ex vivo. However, it was 5-fold more potent than PPAP and selegiline as a MAE in rodents in vivo in terms of the minimum dose that significantly antagonized the behavioral depression induced by tetrabenazine in the shuttle box. On the other hand, MPAP was 20-fold less potent than the highly potent BPAP in the shuttle box. As with BPAP and PPAP, the negative enantiomer (i.e., (–)-MPAP) is more biologically active as a MAE. The effects of MAEs seem to be mediated by intracellular TAAR1 agonism coupled with uptake by monoamine transporters into monoaminergic neurons.

MPAP is closely structurally related to a number of other phenethylamine drugs. These include the entactogen-like drug 1,3-benzodioxolylpentanamine (BDP; K) and its derivatives 1,3-benzodioxolyl-N-methylpentanamine (MBDP; methyl-K) and 1,3-benzodioxolyl-N-ethylpentanamine (EBDP; ethyl-K); the entactogen-like drug 3,4-methylenedioxy-N-propylamphetamine (MDPR); and the cathinone stimulants pentylone (βk-MBDP), ephylone (βk-EBDP), and methylenedioxypyrovalerone (MDPV).

MPAP was first described in the scientific literature in 2001, following BPAP in 1999. It was discovered by József Knoll and colleagues.

== See also ==
- Substituted methylenedioxyphenethylamine
- Substituted α-propylphenethylamine
- Indolylpropylaminopentane (IPAP)
- Naphthylpropylaminopentane (NPAP)
