= Lazabemide =

Chemical compound

Clinical data
- Routes of administration: Oral
- ATC code: none

Legal status
- Legal status: Development terminated

Identifiers
- IUPAC name: N-(2-aminoethyl)-5-chloro-pyridine-2-carboxamide
- CAS Number: 103878-84-8
- PubChem CID: 71307
- IUPHAR/BPS: 6640
- ChemSpider: 64426
- UNII: 420HD787N9
- KEGG: D04681
- CompTox Dashboard (EPA): DTXSID2048294

Chemical and physical data
- Formula: C_{8}H_{10}ClN_{3}O
- Molar mass: 199.64 g·mol^{−1}

Lazabemide (proposed trade names Pakio, Tempium) is a reversible and selective inhibitor of monoamine oxidase B (MAO-B) that was under development as an antiparkinsonian agent but was never marketed.
