= Clorgiline =

Chemical compound

Clinical data
- Other names: Clargyline
- Drug class: Monoamine oxidase inhibitor; MAO-A inhibitor
- ATC code: None

Legal status
- Legal status: In general: uncontrolled

Identifiers
- IUPAC name: N-[3-(2,4-dichlorophenoxy)propyl]-N-methyl-prop-2-yn-1-amine
- CAS Number: 17780-72-2
- PubChem CID: 4380
- IUPHAR/BPS: 6636
- DrugBank: DB04017
- ChemSpider: 4227
- UNII: LYJ16FZU9Q
- KEGG: D03248
- ChEBI: CHEBI:3763
- ChEMBL: ChEMBL8706
- CompTox Dashboard (EPA): DTXSID3048445

Chemical and physical data
- Formula: C_{13}H_{15}Cl_{2}NO
- Molar mass: 272.17 g·mol^{−1}
- 3D model (JSmol): Interactive image
- SMILES: Clc1cc(Cl)ccc1OCCCN(CC#C)C
- InChI: InChI=1S/C13H15Cl2NO/c1-3-7-16(2)8-4-9-17-13-6-5-11(14)10-12(13)15/h1,5-6,10H,4,7-9H2,2H3; Key:BTFHLQRNAMSNLC-UHFFFAOYSA-N

Clorgiline (INN), or clorgyline (BAN), is a monoamine oxidase inhibitor (MAOI) and investigational antidepressant related to pargyline. Specifically, it is an irreversible and selective inhibitor of monoamine oxidase A (MAO-A). Clorgiline was never marketed, but it has found use in scientific research.

In addition to its MAOI activity, it has been found to bind with high affinity to the σ_{1} receptor (K_{i} = 3.2–510 nM) and with very high affinity to the imidazoline I_{2} receptor (K_{i} = 40 pM). Unlike selegiline, clorgiline does not appear to be a monoaminergic activity enhancer (MAE).

Clorgiline is also a multidrug efflux pump inhibitor. Holmes et al., 2012 reverse azole fungicide resistance using clorgiline, showing promise for its use in multiple fungicide resistance.
