= Monoaminergic activity enhancer =

Class of compounds in the nervous system

- Drug class
- Selegiline, the prototypical MAE.

Class identifiers
- Synonyms: MAE; Monoamine activity enhancer; Catecholaminergic activity enhancer; Catecholamine activity enhancer; CAE; Dopaminergic activity enhancer; Dopamine activity enhancer; DAE; Serotonergic activity enhancer; Serotonin activity enhancer; SAE; Catecholaminergic/serotonergic activity enhancer; CAE/SAE
- Use: Depression, Parkinson's disease, other conditions
- Mode of action: Enhancement of the action potential-mediated release of monoamine neurotransmitters
- Mechanism of action: Possibly TAAR1 agonism
- Chemical class: Phenethylamines, tryptamines, benzofurans, others

Legal status

Monoaminergic activity enhancers (MAE), also known as catecholaminergic/serotonergic activity enhancers (CAE/SAE), are a class of drugs that enhance the action potential-evoked release of monoamine neurotransmitters in the nervous system. MAEs are distinct from monoamine releasing agents (MRAs) like amphetamine and fenfluramine in that they do not induce the release of monoamines from synaptic vesicles but rather potentiate only nerve impulse propagation-mediated monoamine release. That is, MAEs increase the amounts of monoamine neurotransmitters released by neurons per electrical impulse.

MAEs have been shown to significantly enhance nerve impulse-mediated dopamine release in the striatum, substantia nigra, and olfactory tubercle; norepinephrine release from the locus coeruleus; and/or serotonin release from the raphe nucleus in rodent studies. Some MAEs are selective for effects on some of these neurotransmitters but not on others. The maximal impacts of MAEs on brain monoamine levels are more modest than with monoamine releasing agents like amphetamine and monoamine reuptake inhibitors like methylphenidate. MAEs have a peculiar and characteristic bimodal concentration–response relationship, with two bell-shaped curves of MAE activity across tested concentration ranges. Hence, there is a restricted concentration range for optimal pharmacodynamic activity.

Endogenous MAEs include certain trace amines like β-phenylethylamine and tryptamine, while synthetic MAEs include certain phenethylamine and tryptamine derivatives like selegiline, phenylpropylaminopentane (PPAP), benzofuranylpropylaminopentane (BPAP), and indolylpropylaminopentane (IPAP). Although this was originally not known, the actions of MAEs may be mediated by agonism of the trace amine-associated receptor 1 (TAAR1). Antagonists of MAEs, like EPPTB (a known TAAR1 antagonist), 3-F-BPAP, and rasagiline, have been identified. In 2025, it was discovered that PPAP is a potent catecholamine reuptake inhibitor, including of dopamine and to a lesser extent of norepinephrine.

== Endogenous monoaminergic activity enhancers ==
A few endogenous MAEs have been identified, including the trace amines β-phenylethylamine (PEA), tyramine, and tryptamine. At a concentration of 16 μM (1.6 × 10^{−5} M), β-phenylethylamine has been shown to act as a MAE for norepinephrine (2.6-fold increase), dopamine (1.3-fold increase), and serotonin (2.3-fold increase) in the rat brainstem in vitro. Conversely, tryptamine has been found to act as a MAE for serotonin (3.6-fold increase) at a concentration of 1.3 μM (1.3 × 10^{−6} M) and as a MAE for norepinephrine (1.9-fold increase) and dopamine (1.3-fold increase) at a concentration of 13 μΜ (1.3 × 10^{−5} M) in the rat brainstem in vitro. It is apparent that tryptamine at a concentration of 1.3 μΜ is a much more effective MAE of serotonin than is β-phenylethylamine at a concentration of 16 μM. Hence, tryptamine is a substantially more potent MAE of serotonin than β-phenylethylamine, whereas β-phenylethylamine is a slightly more potent MAE of norepinephrine than tryptamine. It has been suggested that these selectivities may indicate the existence of multiple MAE receptors for these compounds. Tyramine has been shown to act as a MAE of norepinephrine, dopamine, and serotonin in the rat brainstem in vitro similarly to β-phenylethylamine. β-Phenylethylamine and tyramine additionally act as potent monoamine releasing agents of norepinephrine and dopamine at higher concentrations. The MAE and monoamine releasing agent actions of these compounds are mechanistically distinct and they have been referred to as "mixed-acting" monoaminergic potentiators.

The synthetic MAE benzofuranylpropylaminopentane (BPAP) has been found to be far more potent as a MAE and to exert MAE and related effects at much lower concentrations than known endogenous MAEs like β-phenylethylamine and tryptamine. For example, BPAP has been found to have peak effects at a concentration of 10^{−14} M (femtomolar to picomolar range). It has been hypothesized that the very high potency of BPAP may foreshadow the existence of much more potent endogenous MAEs than currently known compounds like β-phenylethylamine and tryptamine that have yet to be identified and may be the true key endogenous mediators for this system.

== Monoaminergic activity enhancing drugs ==
β-Phenylethylamine, tryptamine, and tyramine when administered to animals are ineffective as MAEs in vivo due to very rapid breakdown by monoamine oxidase (MAO). However, monoamine oxidase inhibitors (MAOIs), specifically MAO-B inhibitors like selegiline, can dramatically potentiate β-phenylethylamine by inhibiting its metabolism and thereby allow for it to produce significant pharmacodynamic effects. Tyramine, unlike β-phenylethylamine and tryptamine, is unable to cross the blood–brain barrier, which additionally limits its capacity for centrally mediated effects.

Selegiline (L-deprenyl) (a phenylethylamine derivative) is used as an antiparkinsonian agent and antidepressant and exhibits CAE effects independent of its monoamine oxidase inhibition. It has been shown to enhance both impulse-evoked norepinephrine and dopamine release. Selegiline shows a bimodal concentration–response relationship in terms of its CAE actions for dopamine activity in the striatum. Besides enhancing catecholaminergic activity, it has additionally been found to decrease serotonergic activity. Selegiline's metabolite desmethylselegiline has also been found to be active as a CAE. Aside from selegiline and its metabolites, D-deprenyl is a CAE, with slightly lower potency than selegiline. By extension to selegiline and D-deprenyl, the racemic form, deprenyl, is a CAE. A halogenated analogue of deprenyl, 4-fluorodeprenyl, has been found to act as a CAE as well.

The psychostimulants amphetamine (both levoamphetamine and dextroamphetamine) and methamphetamine (both levomethamphetamine and dextromethamphetamine) are CAEs like selegiline, but these drugs are also potent monoamine releasing agents and these actions overshadow the former activities. Levomethamphetamine, levoamphetamine, and dextroamphetamine are all similarly potent as CAEs and compared to selegiline, but are substantially more potent as CAEs than dextromethamphetamine. Besides acting as CAEs, levomethamphetamine and dextromethamphetamine diminish serotonergic activity, similarly to selegiline, whereas levoamphetamine and dextroamphetamine do not do so.

Phenylpropylaminopentane (PPAP) is a CAE for norepinephrine and dopamine that was derived from selegiline and is a phenethylamine derivative. In contrast to selegiline, it lacks monoamine oxidase inhibition and hence is much more selective in its actions. Indolylpropylaminopentane (IPAP) is a MAE for serotonin, norepinephrine, and dopamine that was derived from PPAP and is a tryptamine derivative. It shows some selectivity for serotonin, with its maximal impact on this neurotransmitter occurring at 10-fold lower concentrations than for norepinephrine or dopamine. Benzofuranylpropylaminopentane (BPAP) is a MAE for serotonin, norepinephrine, and dopamine that was derived from PPAP and is related to tryptamine. It is about 130 times more potent in its MAE actions than selegiline. Similarly to selegiline, BPAP shows a bimodal concentration–response relationship in its MAE effects.

In contrast to selegiline, rasagiline and its metabolite (R)-1-aminoindan do not have MAE actions. Similarly, SU-11739 (AGN-1133; J-508), the N-methylated analogue of rasagiline and a closer analogue of selegiline, does not have MAE actions.

== Mechanism of action ==
The mechanism of action of MAEs, for instance the trace amines, may be explained by their shared affinities for the trace amine-associated receptor 1 (TAAR1). Trace amines like β-phenylethylamine and tyramine bind to the TAAR1 with high affinity, whereas the affinities of other monoamines like octopamine, dopamine, and serotonin for this receptor are much lower. In addition, recent findings have suggested that known synthetic MAEs like BPAP and selegiline may exert their effects via TAAR1 activation. This was evidenced by the TAAR1 antagonist EPPTB reversing their MAE effects, among other findings. However, in an older study of MAO-B knockout mice, no non-MAO binding of radiolabeled selegiline was detected in the brain, suggesting that this agent might not act directly via a macromolecular target in terms of its MAE effects.

MAEs require transport into monoaminergic neurons by monoamine transporters (MATs) like the dopamine transporter (DAT). Hence, they must be substrates of these transporters in order to exert their MAE effects. This may be due to the fact that the TAAR1 is located intracellularly within neurons. Transport by MATs into monoaminergic neurons is similarly required for the releasing effects of monoamine releasing agents (MRAs) like amphetamine. The TAAR1 may also be involved in the releasing effects of MRAs as with MAEs. It has been proposed that there may be two distinct binding sites on the TAAR1, one for MAEs and one for MRAs. MAEs are thought to induce action potential-dependent vesicular monoamine release via TAAR1 activation, whereas MRAs are thought to induce impulse-independent non-vesicular monoamine release via TAAR1 activation. However, there are conflicting findings with regard to the involvement of TAAR1 activation in the monoamine-releasing actions of MRAs, such as TAAR1 activation and signaling inhibiting the psychostimulant and reinforcing effects of MRAs, MRAs continuing to induce monoamine release in TAAR1 knockout mice, and many MRAs, including most cathinones, being inactive as agonists of the human TAAR1.

As with MRAs like amphetamine and monoamine reuptake inhibitors like methylphenidate, single acute doses of MAEs rapidly increase brain monoamine levels. However, MAEs have more limited impacts on brain monoamine levels compared to MRAs and monoamine reuptake inhibitors. In an in vivo rodent study, BPAP was found to maximally increase dopamine levels in the striatum by 44%, in the substantia nigra by 118%, and in the olfactory tubercle by 57%; norepinephrine levels in the locus coeruleus by 228%; and serotonin levels in the raphe nucleus by 166%. The maximal impacts of other MAEs like selegiline on brain monoamine levels are similar. For comparison, the norepinephrine–dopamine releasing agent amphetamine increases dopamine levels in the striatum by 700 to 1,500% of baseline and norepinephrine levels in the prefrontal cortex by 400 to 450% of baseline. However, there appears to be no dose–effect ceiling with this agent and it can maximally increase striatal dopamine levels by more than 5,000% of baseline at higher doses. Monoamine reuptake inhibitors including methylphenidate, atomoxetine, bupropion, and vanoxerine (GBR-12909) also robustly increase brain monoamine levels in rodents, though the maximal impacts of these agents are much smaller (e.g., 5- to 10-fold lower) than those of releasers like amphetamine.

MAEs like PPAP and BPAP have been found to increase locomotor activity, increase stereotyped behavior, facilitate learning and retention, and produce antidepressant-like effects in rodent studies. In relation to these effects, they have been described as having psychostimulant-like effects. The locomotor stimulant effect of BPAP has been shown to be dependent on enhancement of dopaminergic signaling. In contrast to PPAP and BPAP, as well as in contrast to amphetamines, selegiline does not appear to stimulate locomotor activity and lacks psychostimulant-like effects in rodents. Accordingly, selegiline has been reported to not activate the mesolimbic dopamine pathway in rodents.

== Antagonists ==
Antagonists of MAEs are known. For example, 3-F-BPAP, a derivative of BPAP, antagonizes the MAE actions of BPAP. However, it does not antagonize the MAE actions of selegiline or PPAP. EPPTB, a TAAR1 antagonist, has been found to reverse the MAE actions of both BPAP and selegiline. Likewise, rasagiline has been found to reverse the MAE actions of selegiline and has been proposed as a possible TAAR1 antagonist.

== Monoaminergic activity enhancers versus other monoaminergic drugs ==
József Knoll, the discoverer of MAE action, posited that MAEs like selegiline were well suited to the enhancement of monoaminergic function and could developed as agents to slow/delay the cognitive effects of aging. Until his passing in 2018, Knoll authored and supported research which investigated the effects of MAEs on lifespan and behavior in pre-clinical models. Knoll maintained that MAEs augment monoaminergic transmission in a manner that more effectively restores and maintains youthful monoaminergic dynamics as compared to other monoaminergic drugs, such as monoamine releasing agents, monoamine reuptake inhibitors, monoamine metabolism inhibitors, and direct monoamine receptor agonists. In contrast to MAEs, Knoll posited that these agents produce supraphysiological alterations in monoaminergic transmission that elicit compensatory homeostatic responses and unwanted side effects. On this basis, Knoll proposed that MAEs were theoretically less prone to tolerance, better tolerated, and associated with fewer adverse effects than other monoaminergic drugs.

== Enhancer regulation system and age-related changes ==
An endogenous enhancer regulation system for monoaminergic neurons has been proposed to exist in which so-called enhancer substances can potentiate the action potential-evoked release of monoamine neurotransmitters in a variety of brain areas. This has also been referred to as the "mesencephalic enhancer regulation" system to emphasize the key importance of dopaminergic neurons and their modulation of behavior in this system. However, enhancer-sensitive neurons are also present outside of the mesencephalon (midbrain) and activity enhancers can affect noradrenergic and serotonergic neurons as well. Enhancer effects have even been observed in the peripheral nervous system. The enhancer regulation system has been theorized to play an important role in dynamically controlling innate and acquired drives and mediating age-related changes in goal-directed behavioral activity. The concept of this system was created and advanced by the developers of selegiline, including József Knoll and Ildikó Miklya. Endogenous enhancer substances like phenethylamine and tryptamine are known, but are of relatively low potency. The key endogenous actors in the enhancer regulation system have been hypothesized to be much more potent but have not been identified.

Rodents are much more behaviorally and motivationally active in the late developmental phase of life (2 months) than in the early post-developmental phase (4 months). This has been specifically quantified with orienting-searching reflex activity induced by hunger. Male rats are weaned at about 3 weeks of age and complete sexual development by 2 months of age. Subsequent research found that brain monoamine release is much higher during the developmental phase (4 weeks of age) compared to prior to weaning (2 weeks of age) or following sexual maturity (16–32 weeks of age). This has included dopamine release in the striatum, substantia nigra, and olfactory tubercle; norepinephrine release in the locus coeruleus; and serotonin release in the raphe nucleus. Serotonin release was 6- to 7-fold higher at 4 weeks of age compared to 2 weeks of age, whereas dopamine and norepinephrine release in their respective areas was around 2-fold higher relative to pre-weaning and post-sexual maturity. In addition, monoamine release progressively declines with age going from 4 weeks to 32 weeks. The higher behavioral activity of rodents at 2 months of age compared to before or after this age has been attributed to greater activity of the brain catecholaminergic system at this time.

As previously described, brain monoamine release begins to rapidly decrease with sexual maturity in rodents. This suggests that sex hormones and the onset of their production may dampen brain monoamine release. Accordingly, brain monoamine release was found to be significantly higher in prepubertally castrated rats at 3 months of age compared to non-castrated controls. In addition, treatment of 3-week-old prepubertal rats for 2 weeks with exogenous sex hormones, including the androgen testosterone or the estrogen estrone, though not progesterone, significantly and rapidly reduced brain monoamine release relative to untreated controls. Similarly, sexual activity following sexual maturity substantially declines with age in both male rodents and humans. This is thought to be due to age-related decreased activity of the brain dopaminergic system.

It is known that brain levels of phenethylamine, a known endogenous enhancer substance, decline with age. This may be due to progressively increased levels of MAO-B with age. Decreased levels of phenethylamine may contribute to reduced activation of the enhancer regulation system and reduced brain catecholamine release with age. However, the key endogenous actors of the enhancer regulation system have been theorized to be more potent than phenethylamine but have yet to be identified. It has been hypothesized that highly potent enhancer substances may exist that may be able to rapidly modulate the activity of brain catecholaminergic neurons by as much as 5- to 10-fold to quickly control time-dependent motivational states. However, such mediators remain speculative and have not been discovered or substantiated as of present.

Rodent studies have found that exogenous MAEs like selegiline and BPAP augment brain monoamine release, slow monoaminergic neurodegeneration, and help to preserve behavioral activity with age. As an example, selegiline has been found to augment sexual performance and delay its age-related decline in rodents. It has been proposed that exogenous MAEs like selegiline might be able to modestly slow the age-related decay of brain monoamine release in humans, although such hypotheses have yet to be tested.

== Medical use ==
Selegiline is currently the only MAE without concomitant potent monoamine releasing agent actions that is available for medical use. It is also a selective MAO-B inhibitor and is used in the treatment of Parkinson's disease and depression. According to József Knoll, one of the original developers of selegiline, the CAE effects of selegiline may be more important than MAO-B inhibition in terms of its effectiveness for Parkinson's disease. This is consistent with clinical findings that selegiline may be more effective in the treatment of Parkinson's disease than rasagiline.

Selective MAEs have been proposed for potential medical use in the treatment of a variety of conditions. These include psychiatric disorders like depression and attention deficit hyperactivity disorder (ADHD) as well as neurodegenerative diseases like Parkinson's disease and Alzheimer's disease. There has also been theoretical interest in MAEs as potential antiaging agents that might help to oppose age-related catecholaminergic neurodegeneration and prolong lifespan, though such ideas have not been tested. Benzofuranylpropylaminopentane (BPAP) in particular has been proposed for potential clinical development. However, no other MAEs besides selegiline have been developed for medical use as of present.

Amphetamine, methamphetamine, and likely other substituted amphetamines are MAEs, but their MAE effects are overshadowed and complicated by their concomitant potent monoamine releasing agent activities.

== List of monoaminergic activity enhancers ==
=== Endogenous ===
- Phenylethylamine
- Tryptamine
- Tyramine

=== Synthetic ===
- BPAP
- PPAP
- IPAP
- MPAP
- NPAP
- Deprenyl
  - Selegiline (L-deprenyl)
  - D-Deprenyl
- Desmethylselegiline
- 4-Fluorodeprenyl
- Amphetamine
  - Dextroamphetamine
  - Levoamphetamine
- Methamphetamine
  - Dextromethamphetamine
  - Levomethamphetamine

=== Antagonists ===
- 3-F-BPAP
- EPPTB
- Rasagiline

== See also ==
- Pro-motivational agent
