= Α-Propylphenethylamine =

α-Propylphenethylamine

Clinical data
- Other names: 1-Phenyl-2-aminopentane; 1-Benzylbutylamine; α-Propylphenethylamine; α-Pr-PEA; APPEA; α-Phenyl-β-aminopentane; PAL-550; PAL550
- Drug class: Monoamine reuptake inhibitor; Stimulant
- ATC code: None

Identifiers
- IUPAC name: 1-phenylpentan-2-amine
- CAS Number: 63951-01-9
- PubChem CID: 115410
- ChemSpider: 103242
- ChEMBL: ChEMBL25435
- CompTox Dashboard (EPA): DTXSID80874246

Chemical and physical data
- Formula: C_{11}H_{17}N
- Molar mass: 163.264 g·mol^{−1}
- 3D model (JSmol): Interactive image
- SMILES: CCCC(CC1=CC=CC=C1)N
- InChI: InChI=1S/C11H17N/c1-2-6-11(12)9-10-7-4-3-5-8-10/h3-5,7-8,11H,2,6,9,12H2,1H3; Key:VXGQDFOHLMAZIV-UHFFFAOYSA-N

α-Propylphenethylamine (APPEA or α-Pr-PEA), also known as 1-phenyl-2-aminopentane, is a stimulant drug of the phenethylamine and amphetamine families. It is the analogue of the β-phenethylamine (PEA) derivatives amphetamine (α-methylphenethylamine; "AMPEA") and phenylisobutylamine (α-ethylphenethylamine; AEPEA) in which the α-alkyl chain has been further lengthened to be a propyl group.

== Pharmacology ==
=== Pharmacodynamics ===
APPEA is known to act as a low-potency dopamine reuptake inhibitor. Conversely, the drug was inactive as a serotonin reuptake inhibitor and was not assessed in terms of norepinephrine reuptake inhibition. It was similarly inactive as a releasing agent of either dopamine or serotonin, being predominantly a reuptake inhibitor. APPEA's IC_{50} values for inhibition of monoamine reuptake were 2,596 nM for dopamine and >10,000 nM for serotonin. Analogues of APPEA like phenylisobutylamine (AEPEA) are norepinephrine–dopamine releasing agents (NDRAs) and norepinephrine–dopamine reuptake inhibitors (NDRIs) and have been found to produce stimulant-like and reinforcing effects in rodents.

== Chemistry ==
=== Derivatives ===
Numerous derivatives of APPEA exist. These include 1,3-benzodioxolylpentanamine (BDP; K) and its derivatives like MBDP (methyl-K) and EBDP (ethyl-K); pentedrone (α-propyl-β-keto-N-methylphenethylamine) and its derivatives like ephylone (N-ethylpentedrone), 4-methylpentedrone, pentylone, and dipentylone; and prolintane and its derivatives like α-pyrrolidinopentiophenone (α-PVP), pyrovalerone, methylenedioxypyrovalerone (MDPV), and naphyrone, among others. Another notable analogue, instead with a thiophene ring, is α-pyrrolidinopentiothiophenone (α-PVT). 1-Phenyl-2-propylaminopentane (PPAP; α,N-dipropylphenethylamine) is the combined derivative of APPEA and propylamphetamine (N-propylamphetamine). Methylenedioxyphenylpropylaminopentane (MPAP) is the 3,4-methylenedioxy derivative of PPAP.

== See also ==
- Substituted phenethylamine
- N,α-Diethylphenethylamine (DEPEA)
- β-Methylphenethylamine (BMPEA)
- Phenacylamine (β-ketophenethylamine)
