= Drug accumulation ratio =

In pharmacokinetics, the drug accumulation ratio (R_{ac}) is the ratio of accumulation of a drug under steady state conditions (i.e., after repeated administration) as compared to a single dose. The higher the value, the more the drug accumulates in the body. An R_{ac} of 1 means no accumulation.

== Studies ==
The accumulation ratio of a specific drug in humans is determined by clinical studies. According to a 2013 analysis, such studies are typically done with 10 to 20 subjects who are given one single dose followed by a washout phase of seven days (median), and then seven to 14 repeated doses to reach steady state conditions. Blood samples are drawn 11 times (median) per subject to determine the blood concentration of the studied drug.

== Calculation ==
The drug accumulation ratio, according to one common definition, is the ratio of the green area to the blue area.

There are various competing calculation methods for the drug accumulation ratio, yielding somewhat different results. A commonly used formula defines R_{ac} as the ratio of the area under the curve (AUC) during a single dosing interval under steady state conditions to the AUC during a dosing interval after one single dose:

$$R_{ac} = \frac {\operatorname{AUC}(\tau,ss)} {\operatorname{AUC}(\tau,1)}$$

where $\tau$ is the dosing interval, ss means steady state and 1 stands for a single-dose application.

Another definition sets R_{ac} to the ratio of the average drug concentration during one day under steady state conditions to the concentration after a single dose.

== Examples ==
| Drug | Trade name | R_{ac} | Reference |
|---|---|---|---|
| Dabrafenib | Tafinlar | 0.73 | |
| Rosuvastatin | Crestor | 1.37 in hemodialysis patients | |
| Lisinopril | Prinivil and others | 1.38 | |
| Ivacaftor | Kalydeco | 2.2–2.9 | |
| Trametinib | Mekinist | 6.0 at 2 mg once daily | |
