= Phenylpropylaminopentane =

Stimulant drug of the substituted phenethylamine class

PPAP

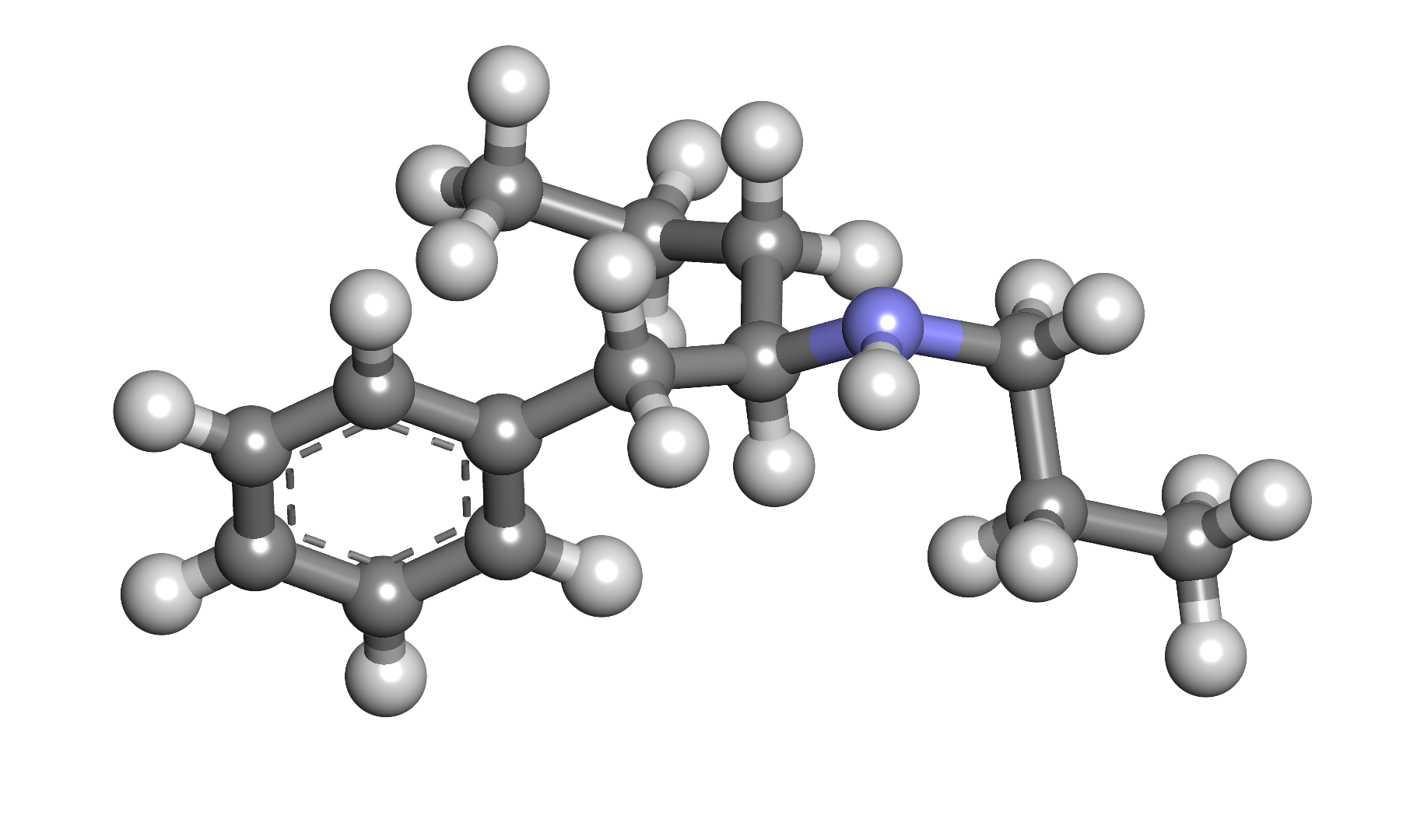

Clinical data
- Other names: PPAP; (–)-PPAP; (2R)-PPAP; MK-306; α,N-Dipropylphenethylamine; DPPEA; α-Desmethyl-α,N-dipropylamphetamine; 1-Phenyl-2-propylaminopentane; 1-Phenyl-2-propylamino-pentane; 1-Phenyl-2-propyl-aminopentane
- Drug class: Catecholaminergic activity enhancer; Norepinephrine–dopamine reuptake inhibitor; Stimulant

Legal status
- Legal status: CA: Schedule 1 due to being an amphetamine derivative; UK: Class A

Identifiers
- IUPAC name: (2R)-1-Phenyl-N-propylpentan-2-amine
- CAS Number: 784118-64-5
- PubChem CID: 51529346
- ChemSpider: 21106218
- UNII: UZ3Q3C2Z57
- CompTox Dashboard (EPA): DTXSID201027213

Chemical and physical data
- Formula: C_{14}H_{23}N
- Molar mass: 205.345 g·mol^{−1}
- 3D model (JSmol): Interactive image
- SMILES: CCCN[C@H](CCC)Cc1ccccc1
- InChI: InChI=1S/C14H23N/c1-3-8-14(15-11-4-2)12-13-9-6-5-7-10-13/h5-7,9-10,14-15H,3-4,8,11-12H2,1-2H3/t14-/m1/s1; Key:PBENSVGEGPJNFJ-CQSZACIVSA-N

1-Phenyl-2-propylaminopentane (PPAP), also known as α,N-dipropylphenethylamine (DPPEA) and by the developmental code name MK-306, is an experimental drug related to selegiline which acts as a catecholaminergic activity enhancer (CAE).

PPAP is a CAE and enhances the nerve impulse propagation-mediated release of norepinephrine and dopamine. It produces psychostimulant-like effects in animals. In 2025, it was discovered that PPAP is a potent catecholamine reuptake inhibitor, including of dopamine and to a lesser extent of norepinephrine. The drug is a phenethylamine and amphetamine derivative and was derived via structural modification of selegiline.

PPAP was first described in the literature in 1988 and in the first major paper in 1992. It led to the development of the improved monoaminergic activity enhancer (MAE) benzofuranylpropylaminopentane (BPAP) in 1999. PPAP was a reference compound for studying the MAE system for many years. However, it was superseded by BPAP, which is more potent, selective, and also enhances serotonin. There has been interest in PPAP for potential clinical use in humans, including in the treatment of depression, attention deficit hyperactivity disorder (ADHD), and Alzheimer's disease. It is a controlled substance in Sweden as of 2020.

== Pharmacology ==
=== Pharmacodynamics ===
==== Catecholaminergic activity enhancer ====
PPAP is classified as a catecholaminergic activity enhancer (CAE), a drug that stimulates the impulse propagation-mediated release of the catecholamine neurotransmitters norepinephrine and dopamine in the brain.

Unlike stimulants such as amphetamine, which release a flood of monoamine neurotransmitters in an uncontrolled manner, (–)-PPAP instead only increases the amount of neurotransmitters that get released when a neuron is stimulated by receiving an impulse from a neighboring neuron. Both amphetamine and (–)-PPAP promote the release of monoamines; however, while amphetamine causes neurons to release neurotransmitter stores into the synapse regardless of external input, (–)-PPAP does not influence the pattern of neurotransmitter release and instead releases a larger amount of neurotransmitters than normal.

Findings in the early 2020s have suggested that known synthetic monoaminergic activity enhancers (MAEs) like PPAP, BPAP, and selegiline may exert their effects via trace amine-associated receptor 1 (TAAR1) agonism. This was evidenced by the TAAR1 antagonist EPPTB reversing the MAE effects of BPAP and selegiline, among other findings. Another compound, rasagiline, has likewise been found to reverse the effects of MAEs, and has been proposed as a possible TAAR1 antagonist.

The therapeutic index for PPAP in animal models is greater than that of amphetamine while producing comparable improvements in learning, retention, and antidepressant effects. It has been found to reduce deficits induced by the dopamine depleting agent tetrabenazine in the shuttle box learning test in rats.

PPAP and selegiline are much less potent than BPAP as MAEs. Whereas PPAP and selegiline are active at doses of 1 to 5 mg/kg in vivo in rats, BPAP is active at doses of 0.05 to 10 mg/kg. BPAP is 130 times as potent as selegiline in the shuttle box test. In contrast to BPAP however, the MAE effects of PPAP and selegiline are not reversed by the BPAP antagonist 3-F-BPAP. In addition, whereas PPAP and selegiline are selective as MAEs of norepinephrine and dopamine, BPAP is a MAE of not only norepinephrine and dopamine but also of serotonin.

==== Catecholamine reuptake inhibitor ====
PPAP was reported in 2025 to act as a potent catecholamine reuptake inhibitor, with IC_{50} values of 57.5 nM at the dopamine transporter (DAT), 571 nM at the norepinephrine transporter (NET), and 19,000 nM at the serotonin transporter (SERT). In terms of dopamine reuptake inhibition, it was 41-fold less potent than MDPV but 7-fold more potent than mephedrone (4-MMC) and 1.3-fold more potent than amphetamine.

==== Other actions ====
Unlike the related CAE selegiline, (–)-PPAP has no activity as a monoamine oxidase inhibitor.

== Chemistry ==
(R)-PPAP chemical structure.

PPAP, also known as α,N-dipropylphenethylamine (DPPEA) or as α-desmethyl-α,N-dipropylamphetamine, is a substituted phenethylamine and amphetamine derivative. It was derived from structural modification of selegiline (L-deprenyl; (R)-(–)-N,α-dimethyl-N-2-propynylphenethylamine).

Both racemic PPAP and subsequently its more active (–)- or (2R)-enantiomer (–)-PPAP have been employed in the literature.

PPAP is similar in chemical structure to propylamphetamine (N-propylamphetamine; NPA; PAL-424), but has an α-propyl chain instead of an α-methyl group. It is also similar in structure to α-propylphenethylamine (APPEA; PAL-550), but has an N-propyl chain instead of no substitution. PPAP can be thought of as the combined derivative of NPA and APPEA. NPA and APPEA are known to be low-potency dopamine reuptake inhibitors (IC_{50} = 1,013 nM and 2,596 nM, respectively) and are inactive as dopamine releasing agents in vitro. Another similar analogue of PPAP is N,α-diethylphenethylamine (DEPEA), which is a norepinephrine–dopamine releasing agent and/or reuptake inhibitor. A more well-known derivative of APPEA related to PPAP is the cathinone pentedrone (α-propyl-β-keto-N-methylphenethylamine), which is a norepinephrine–dopamine reuptake inhibitor.

A related MAE, BPAP, is a substituted benzofuran derivative and tryptamine relative that was derived from structural modification of PPAP. It was developed by replacement of the benzene ring in PPAP with a benzofuran ring. Another related MAE, indolylpropylaminopentane (IPAP), is a tryptamine derivative that is the analogue of PPAP in which the benzene ring has been replaced with an indole ring.

PPAP (MK-306) and its (–)-enantiomer (–)-PPAP must not be confused with the sigma receptor ligand R(−)-N-(3-phenyl-n-propyl)-1-phenyl-2-aminopropane ((–)-PPAP—same acronym) or with the cephamycin antibiotic cefoxitin (MK-306—same developmental code name).

== History ==
Racemic PPAP (MK-306) was first described in the scientific literature in 1988 and a series of papers characterizing it were published in the early 1990s. The first major paper on the drug was published in 1992. It was synthesized by József Knoll and colleagues. The potencies of the different enantiomers of PPAP were assessed in 1994. Subsequent papers have employed (–)-PPAP.

Several patents of PPAP have been published.

The development of PPAP was critical in elucidating that the CAE effects of selegiline are unrelated to its monoamine oxidase inhibition. For many years, PPAP served as a reference compound in studying MAEs. However, it was eventually superseded by BPAP, which was discovered in 1999. This MAE is more potent and selective than PPAP and, in contrast to PPAP and selegiline, also enhances serotonin.

In 2025, PPAP was found to act as a potent catecholamine reuptake inhibitor.

== Society and culture ==
=== Legal status ===
==== Sweden ====
PPAP is a controlled substance in Sweden as of 2020.

== Research ==
PPAP has been proposed as a potential therapeutic agent for attention deficit hyperactivity disorder (ADHD), Alzheimer's disease, and depression based on preclinical findings. The developers of PPAP attempted to have it clinically studied, but were unsuccessful and it was never assessed in humans.

== See also ==
- Substituted α-propylphenethylamine
- Methylenedioxyphenylpropylaminopentane (MPAP)
- Naphthylpropylaminopentane (NPAP)
