= Tryptamine =

Trace amine

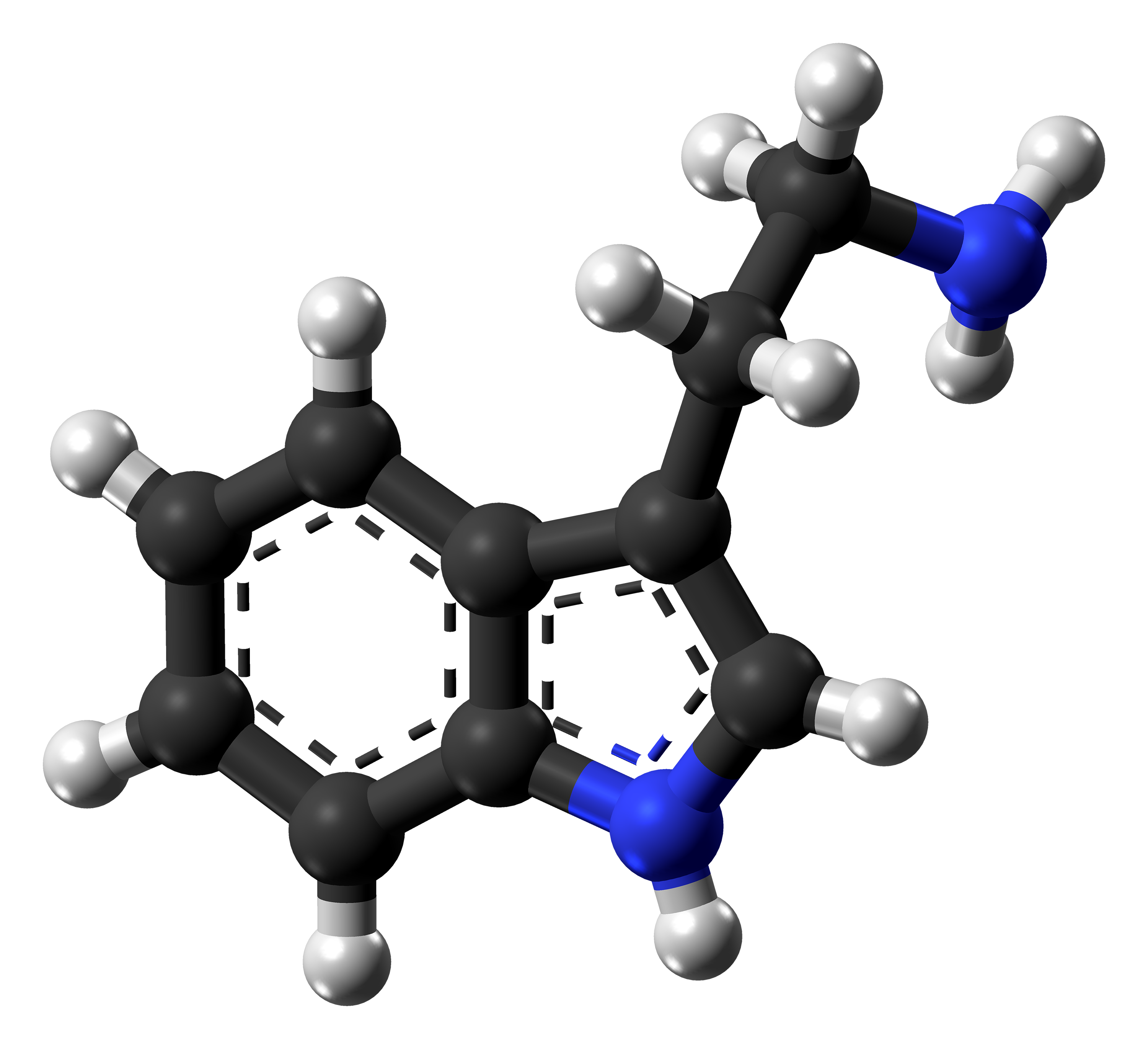

Clinical data
- Other names: T; TrpA; Triptamine; 3-(2-Aminoethyl)indole; 2-(3-Indolyl)ethylamine; Indolylethylamine; Indolethylamine; PAL-235; PAL235
- Routes of administration: Intravenous injection
- Drug class: Serotonin receptor agonist; Trace amine-associated receptor 1 (TAAR1) agonist; Serotonin–norepinephrine–dopamine releasing agent; Serotonergic psychedelic; Hallucinogen
- ATC code: None

Legal status
- Legal status: Legal or unregulated

Pharmacokinetic data
- Bioavailability: Oral: Very low
- Metabolism: Very rapid (oxidative deamination by MAO)
- Metabolites: Indole-3-acetic acid (IAA)
- Onset of action: IV: Very rapid
- Elimination half-life: Very short
- Duration of action: IV: Very short
- Excretion: Urine

Identifiers
- IUPAC name: 2-(1H-indol-3-yl)ethan-1-amine
- CAS Number: 61-54-1
- PubChem CID: 1150
- IUPHAR/BPS: 125
- DrugBank: DB08653
- ChemSpider: 1118
- UNII: 422ZU9N5TV
- KEGG: C00398
- ChEBI: CHEBI:16765
- ChEMBL: ChEMBL6640
- CompTox Dashboard (EPA): DTXSID2075340
- ECHA InfoCard: 100.000.464

Chemical and physical data
- Formula: C_{10}H_{12}N_{2}
- Molar mass: 160.220 g·mol^{−1}
- 3D model (JSmol): Interactive image
- Melting point: 118 °C (244 °F)
- Boiling point: 137 °C (279 °F) (0.15 mmHg)
- Solubility in water: Negligible mg/mL (20 °C)
- SMILES: c1ccc2c(c1)c(c[nH]2)CCN
- InChI: InChI=1S/C10H12N2/c11-6-5-8-7-12-10-4-2-1-3-9(8)10/h1-4,7,12H,5-6,11H2; Key:APJYDQYYACXCRM-UHFFFAOYSA-N

Tryptamine, also known as 2-(3-indolyl)ethylamine, is an indolamine metabolite of the essential amino acid tryptophan. The chemical structure is defined by an indole—a fused benzene and pyrrole ring, and a 2-aminoethyl group at the second carbon (third aromatic atom, with the first one being the heterocyclic nitrogen). The structure of tryptamine is a shared feature of certain aminergic neuromodulators including melatonin, serotonin, bufotenin and psychedelic derivatives such as dimethyltryptamine (DMT), psilocybin, psilocin and others.

Tryptamine has been shown to activate serotonin receptors and trace amine-associated receptors expressed in the mammalian brain, and regulates the activity of dopaminergic, serotonergic and glutamatergic systems. In the human gut, bacteria convert dietary tryptophan to tryptamine, which activates 5-HT_{4} receptors and regulates gastrointestinal motility.

Multiple tryptamine-derived drugs have been developed to treat migraines, while trace amine-associated receptors are being explored as a potential treatment target for neuropsychiatric disorders.

== Natural occurrences ==
For a list of plants, fungi and animals containing tryptamines, see List of psychoactive plants and List of naturally occurring tryptamines.

=== Mammalian brain ===
Endogenous levels of tryptamine in the mammalian brain are less than 100 ng per gram of tissue. However, elevated levels of trace amines have been observed in patients with certain neuropsychiatric disorders taking medications, such as bipolar depression and schizophrenia.

=== Mammalian gut microbiome ===
Tryptamine is relatively abundant in the gut and feces of humans and rodents. Commensal bacteria, including Ruminococcus gnavus and Clostridium sporogenes in the gastrointestinal tract, possess the enzyme tryptophan decarboxylase, which aids in the conversion of dietary tryptophan to tryptamine. Tryptamine is a ligand for gut epithelial serotonin type 4 (5-HT_{4}) receptors and regulates gastrointestinal electrolyte balance through colonic secretions.

== Metabolism ==
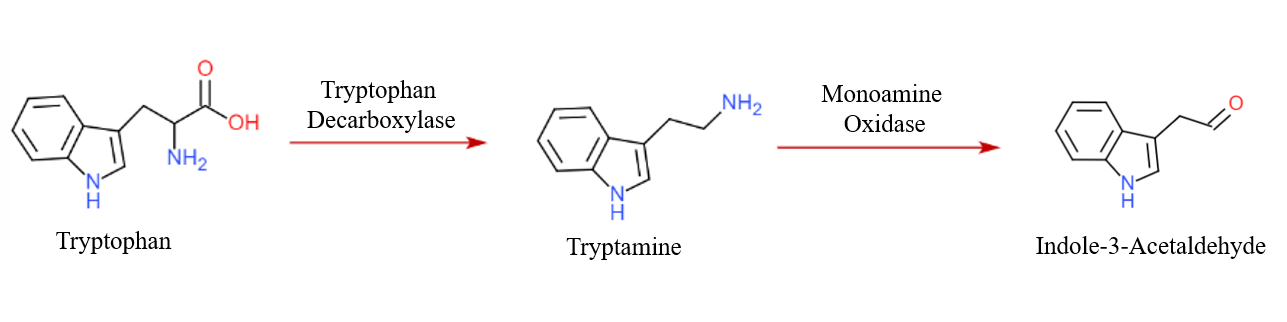

=== Biosynthesis ===
To yield tryptamine in vivo, tryptophan decarboxylase removes the carboxylic acid group on the α-carbon of tryptophan. Synthetic modifications to tryptamine can produce serotonin and melatonin; however, these pathways do not occur naturally as the main pathway for endogenous neurotransmitter synthesis.

=== Catabolism ===
Monoamine oxidases A and B are the primary enzymes involved in tryptamine metabolism to produce indole-3-acetaldehyde, however it is unclear which isoform is specific to tryptamine degradation.

== Biological activity ==
Tryptamine target activities
Target	Affinity (K_{i}, nM)	Species
5-HT_{1A}	32–685 (K_{i}); 899–>10,000 (EC_{50}); ND (E_{max})	Human; Human; Human
5-HT_{1B}	36–525	Human
5-HT_{1D}	23–521	Human
5-HT_{1E}	2,559	Human
5-HT_{1F}	2,409	Human
5-HT_{2A}	37–4,070 (K_{i}); 7.4–257 (EC_{50}); 71–104% (E_{max})	Human; Human; Human
5-HT_{2B}	25–113 (K_{i}); 29.5 (EC_{50}); 92% (E_{max})	Human; Human; Human
5-HT_{2C}	17–3,000 (K_{i}); 1.17–45.7 (EC_{50}); 85–108% (E_{max})	Human; Human; Human
5-HT_{3}	ND	ND
5-HT_{4}	>10,000; 13,500 (EC_{50}); 96% (E_{max})	Mouse; Pig; Pig
5-HT_{5A}	ND	ND
5-HT_{6}	70–1,130	Human
5-HT_{7}	148–596	Human
α_{2A}	19,000	Rat
D_{2}	>10,000	Human
TAAR1	1,400 (K_{i}); 2,700 (EC_{50}); 117% (E_{max}); 130 (K_{i}); 410 (EC_{50}); 91% (E_{max}); 1,084 (K_{i}); 2,210–21,000 (EC_{50}); 73% (E_{max})	Mouse; Mouse; Mouse; Rat; Rat; Rat; Human; Human; Human
SERT	32.6 (EC_{50}) ^{a}	Rat
NET	716 (EC_{50}) ^{a}	Rat
DAT	164 (EC_{50}) ^{a}	Rat
Note: The smaller the value, the more avidly the compound binds to or activates the site. Footnotes: ^{a} = Neurotransmitter release. Refs: Main: Additional:

=== Serotonin receptor agonist ===
Tryptamine is known to act as a serotonin receptor agonist, although its potency is limited by rapid inactivation by monoamine oxidases. It has specifically been found to act as a full agonist of the serotonin 5-HT_{2A} receptor (EC_{50} = 7.36 ± 0.56 nM; E_{max} = 104 ± 4%). Tryptamine was of much lower potency in stimulating the 5-HT_{2A} receptor β-arrestin pathway (EC_{50} = 3,485 ± 234 nM; E_{max} = 108 ± 16%). In contrast to the 5-HT_{2A} receptor, tryptamine was found to be inactive at the serotonin 5-HT_{1A} receptor.

==== Gastrointestinal motility ====
Tryptamine produced by mutualistic bacteria in the human gut activates serotonin GPCRs ubiquitously expressed along the colonic epithelium. Upon tryptamine binding, the activated 5-HT_{4} receptor undergoes a conformational change which allows its G_{s} alpha subunit to exchange GDP for GTP, and its liberation from the 5-HT_{4} receptor and βγ subunit. GTP-bound G_{s} activates adenylyl cyclase, which catalyzes the conversion of ATP into cyclic adenosine monophosphate (cAMP). cAMP opens chloride and potassium ion channels to drive colonic electrolyte secretion and promote intestinal motility.

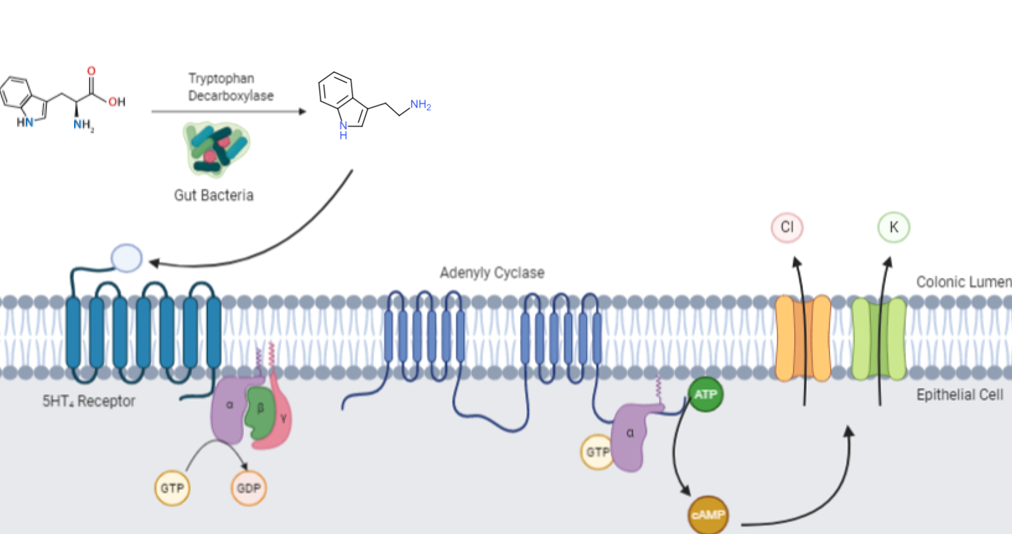
Tryptamine promotes intestinal motility by activating serotonin receptors in the gut to increase colonic secretions.

=== Monoamine releasing agent ===
Tryptamine has been found to act as a monoamine releasing agent (MRA). It is a releaser of serotonin, dopamine, and norepinephrine, in that order of potency (EC_{50} = 32.6 nM, 164 nM, and 716 nM, respectively). That is, it acts as a serotonin–norepinephrine–dopamine releasing agent (SNDRA).

Monoamine release of tryptamine and related agents (EC_{50}, nM)
Compound	5-HT	NE	DA	Ref
Tryptamine	32.6	716	164	
Serotonin	44.4	>10,000	≥1,960	
Phenethylamine	>10,000	10.9	39.5	
Tyramine	2,775	40.6	119	
5-Methoxytryptamine	2,169	>10,000	>10,000	
N-Methyltryptamine	22.4	733	321	
Dimethyltryptamine	114	4,166	>10,000	
Psilocin	561	>10,000	>10,000	
Bufotenin	30.5	>10,000	>10,000	
5-MeO-DMT	>10,000	>10,000	>10,000	
α-Methyltryptamine	21.7–68	79–112	78.6–180	
α-Ethyltryptamine	23.2	640	232	
D-Amphetamine	698–1,765	6.6–7.2	5.8–24.8	
Notes: The smaller the value, the more strongly the drug releases the neurotransmitter. The assays were done in rat brain synaptosomes and human potencies may be different. See also Monoamine releasing agent § Activity profiles for a larger table with more compounds. Refs:

=== Monoaminergic activity enhancer ===
Tryptamine is a monoaminergic activity enhancer (MAE) of serotonin, norepinephrine, and dopamine in addition to its serotonin receptor agonism. That is, it enhances the action potential-mediated release of these monoamine neurotransmitters. The MAE actions of tryptamine and other MAEs may be mediated by TAAR1 agonism. Synthetic and more potent MAEs like benzofuranylpropylaminopentane (BPAP) and indolylpropylaminopentane (IPAP) have been derived from tryptamine.

=== TAAR1 agonist ===
Tryptamine is an agonist of the trace amine-associated receptor 1 (TAAR1). It is a potent TAAR1 full agonist in rats, a weak TAAR1 full agonist in mice, and a very weak TAAR1 partial agonist in humans. Tryptamine may act as a trace neuromodulator in some species via activation of TAAR1 signaling.

The TAAR1 is a stimulatory G protein-coupled receptor (GPCR) that is weakly expressed in the intracellular compartment of both pre- and postsynaptic neurons. TAAR1 agonists have been implicated in regulating monoaminergic neurotransmission, for instance by activating G protein-coupled inwardly-rectifying potassium channels (GIRKs) and reducing neuronal firing via facilitation of membrane hyperpolarization through the efflux of potassium ions.

TAAR1 agonists are under investigation as a novel treatment for neuropsychiatric conditions like schizophrenia, drug addiction, and depression. The TAAR1 is expressed in brain structures associated with dopamine systems, such as the ventral tegmental area (VTA) and serotonin systems in the dorsal raphe nuclei (DRN). Additionally, the human TAAR1 gene is localized at 6q23.2 on the human chromosome, which is a susceptibility locus for mood disorders and schizophrenia. Activation of TAAR1 suggests a potential novel treatment for neuropsychiatric disorders, as TAAR1 agonists produce antipsychotic-like, anti-addictive, and antidepressant-like effects in animals.

TAAR1 affinities and activational potencies of tryptamines
Compound	Human TAAR1		Mouse TAAR1		Rat TAAR1	
Compound	EC_{50} (nM)	K_{i} (nM)	EC_{50} (nM)	K_{i} (nM)	EC_{50} (nM)	K_{i} (nM)
Tryptamine	21,000	N/A	2,700	1,400	410	130
Serotonin	>50,000	N/A	>50,000	N/A	5,200	N/A
Psilocin	>30,000	N/A	2,700	17,000	920	1,400
Dimethyltryptamine	>10,000	N/A	1,200	3,300	1,500	22,000
Notes: (1) EC_{50} and K_{i} values are in nanomolar (nM). (2) EC_{50} reflects the concentration required to elicit 50% of the maximum TAAR1 response. (3) The smaller the K_{i} value, the stronger the compound binds to the receptor.

=== Other actions ===
Tryptamine has been found to act as a potent agonist of the GPR139 and to be involved in sleep regulation.

=== Effects in animals and humans ===
In a published clinical study, tryptamine, at a total dose of 23 to 277 mg by intravenous infusion, produced hallucinogenic effects or perceptual disturbances similar to those of small doses of lysergic acid diethylamide (LSD). It also produced other LSD-like effects, including pupil dilation, increased blood pressure, and increased force of the patellar reflex. Tryptamine produced side effects including nausea, vomiting, dizziness, tingling sensations, sweating, and bodily heaviness among others as well. Conversely, there were no changes in heart rate or respiratory rate. The onset of the effects was rapid and the duration was very short. This can be attributed to the very rapid metabolism of tryptamine by monoamine oxidase (MAO) and its very short elimination half-life.

In animals, tryptamine, alone and/or in combination with a monoamine oxidase inhibitor (MAOI), produces behavioral changes such as hyperlocomotion and reversal of reserpine-induced behavioral depression. In addition, it produces effects like hyperthermia, tachycardia, myoclonus, and seizures or convulsions, among others. Findings on tryptamine and the head-twitch response in rodents have been mixed, with some studies reporting no effect, some studies reporting induction of head twitches by tryptamine, and others reporting that tryptamine actually antagonized 5-hydroxytryptophan (5-HTP)-induced head twitches. Another study found that combination of tryptamine with an MAOI dose-dependently produced head twitches. Head twitches in rodents are a behavioral proxy of psychedelic-like effects. Many of the effects of tryptamine can be reversed by serotonin receptor antagonists like metergoline, metitepine (methiothepin), and cyproheptadine. Conversely, the effects of tryptamine in animals are profoundly augmented by MAOIs due to inhibition of its metabolism.

Tryptamine seems to also elevate prolactin and cortisol levels in animals and/or humans.

The LD_{50} values of tryptamine in animals include 100 mg/kg i.p. in mice, 500 mg/kg s.c. in mice, and 223 mg/kg i.p. in rats.

== Pharmacokinetics ==
Tryptamine produced endogenously or administered peripherally is readily able to cross the blood–brain barrier and enter the central nervous system. This is in contrast to serotonin, which is peripherally selective. However, it has been reported that tryptamine also shows partial peripheral selectivity.

Tryptamine is metabolized by monoamine oxidase (MAO) to form indole-3-acetic acid (IAA). Its metabolism is described as extremely rapid and its elimination half-life and duration as very short. In addition, its duration is described as shorter than that of dimethyltryptamine (DMT). Brain tryptamine levels are increased up to 300-fold by MAOIs in animals. In addition, the effects of exogenous tryptamine are strongly augmented by monoamine oxidase inhibitors (MAOIs).

Tryptamine is excreted in urine and its rate of urinary excretion has been reported to be pH-dependent.

== Chemistry ==
Tryptamine is a substituted tryptamine derivative and trace amine and is structurally related to the amino acid tryptophan.

=== Properties ===
The experimental log P of tryptamine is 1.55.

=== Synthesis ===
The chemical synthesis of tryptamine has been described.

=== Analogues and derivatives ===
The endogenous monoamine neurotransmitters serotonin (5-hydroxytryptamine or 5-HT) and melatonin (5-methoxy-N-acetyltryptamine), as well as trace amines like N-methyltryptamine (NMT), dimethyltryptamine (DMT), and bufotenin (N,N-dimethylserotonin), are derivatives of tryptamine.

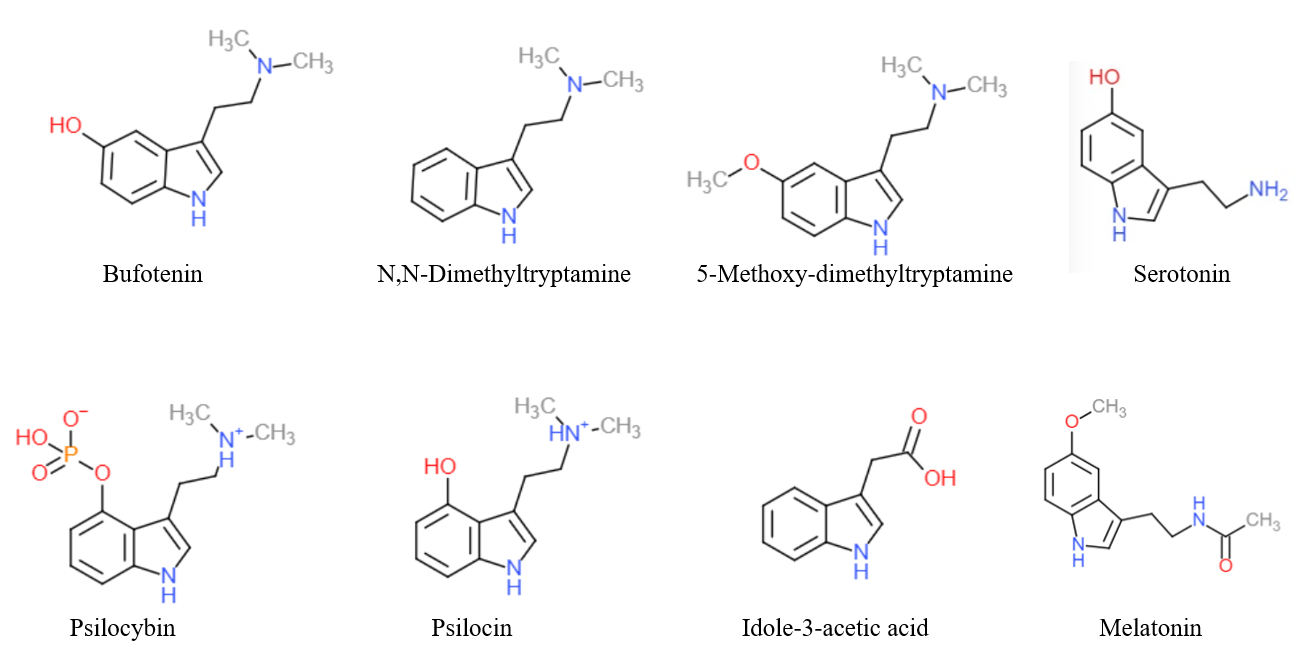
All tryptamine derivatives possess a modified 2-aminoethyl group and/or the addition of a substituent on the indole.

A variety of drugs, including both naturally occurring and pharmaceutical substances, are derivatives of tryptamine. These include the tryptamine psychedelics like psilocybin, psilocin, DMT, and 5-MeO-DMT; tryptamine stimulants, entactogens, psychedelics, and/or antidepressants like α-methyltryptamine (αMT) and α-ethyltryptamine (αET); triptan antimigraine agents like sumatriptan; certain antipsychotics like oxypertine; and the sleep aid melatonin.

Various other drugs, including ergolines and lysergamides like the psychedelic lysergic acid diethylamide (LSD), the antimigraine agents ergotamine, dihydroergotamine, and methysergide, and the antiparkinsonian agents bromocriptine, cabergoline, lisuride, and pergolide; β-carbolines like harmine (some of which are monoamine oxidase inhibitors (MAOIs)); Iboga alkaloids like the hallucinogen ibogaine; yohimbans like the α_{2} blocker yohimbine; antipsychotics like ciclindole and flucindole; and the MAOI antidepressant metralindole, can all be thought of as cyclized tryptamine derivatives.

Deuterated isotopologues of tryptamine include α,α-dideuterotryptamine and β,β-dideuterotryptamine, among others.

A notable prodrug of tryptamine with sustained effects is N-(2-cyanoethyl)tryptamine (CE-T).

Drugs very closely related to tryptamines, but technically not tryptamines themselves, include certain triptans like avitriptan and naratriptan; the antipsychotics sertindole and tepirindole; and the MAOI antidepressants pirlindole and tetrindole.

== History ==
Tryptamine, referred to by the name 3-β-aminoethylindole, was first synthesized by Arthur James Ewins and Patrick Laidlaw in 1910. Subsequently, they referred to it by the name indolethylamine in 1912 and 1913. The name tryptamine first emerged by at least 1918.

Following tryptamine's synthesis, N-methylated tryptamines like N-methyltryptamine (NMT) and dimethyltryptamine (DMT) were synthesized by Richard Manske in 1931. Subsequently, the chemical structure of serotonin (5-hydroxytryptamine; 5-HT) was identified—and hence serotonin was first "truly" discovered (having been isolated earlier in the 1930s)—by Maurice M. Rapport in 1949. The structural similarity between serotonin and the psychedelic drug LSD, a lysergamide and cyclized tryptamine that contains tryptamine within its structure, was noticed and described by Dilworth Wayne Woolley and Elliott Shaw in 1954. The hallucinogenic effects of simple tryptamines themselves were not discovered until those of bufotenin and DMT were elucidated in 1955 and 1956, for instance by Stephen Szára, soon after their first isolation from hallucinogenic snuffs.

The psychedelic effects of tryptamine itself in humans were first reported by W. R. Martin and J. W. Sloan in 1970.

== See also ==
- Substituted tryptamine
- Phenethylamine
