= József Knoll =

Hungarian psychopharmacologist who developed selegiline

- Born: May 30, 1925; Kassa, Hungary (now Košice, Slovakia)
- Died: April 17, 2018 (aged 92)
- Other names: Joseph Knoll; Jozsef Knoll
- Occupation: Psychopharmacologist

József Knoll (May 30, 1925 – April 17, 2018), or Joseph Knoll, was a Hungarian psychopharmacologist known for developing the antiparkinsonian and antidepressant drug selegiline (L-deprenyl).

He developed selegiline in the 1960s and subsequently studied the drug and related agents for many decades. Knoll also developed the concepts of monoaminergic activity enhancers (MAEs) and the mesencephalic enhancer regulation system, among other contributions. MAEs developed by Knoll and colleagues include selegiline, benzofuranylpropylaminopentane (BPAP), and phenylpropylaminopentane (PPAP), among others.

During his scientific career, Knoll published 894 papers and was the originator of 55 patents. As of 2018, his papers had been cited more than 10,000 times. He is described as one of the best-known Hungarian pharmacologists.

Knoll is known for having extensively researched and promoted selegiline for claimed drive- and longevity-enhancing effects related to its MAE activity. He published a book expounding his views on the topic in 2012. Knoll himself began taking a low 1 mg daily dose of selegiline on January 1, 1989 at the age of 64. He reported in 2012 that this had continued for 22 years uninterrupted. Knoll stated that he had become so fascinated with the possible longevity-promoting effects of selegiline he was studying that he had decided to start taking it as a self-experiment. Knoll later died in 2018 at the age of 92.

== Selected publications ==
=== Books ===
- Knoll J (2005). The Brain and Its Self: A Neurochemical Concept of the Innate and Acquired Drives. Berlin/Heidelberg: Springer-Verlag. ISBN 978-3-540-23969-7.
- Knoll J (2012). How Selegiline ((-)-Deprenyl) Slows Brain Aging. Bentham Science Publishers. ISBN 978-1-60805-470-1.

=== Reviews ===
- Knoll J (2001). "Antiaging compounds: (-)deprenyl (selegeline) and (-)1-(benzofuran-2-yl)-2-propylaminopentane, [(-)BPAP], a selective highly potent enhancer of the impulse propagation mediated release of catecholamine and serotonin in the brain". CNS Drug Rev. 7 (3): 317–45. doi:10.1111/j.1527-3458.2001.tb00202.x. PMC 6494119. PMID 11607046.
- Knoll J (August 2003). "Enhancer regulation/endogenous and synthetic enhancer compounds: a neurochemical concept of the innate and acquired drives". Neurochem Res. 28 (8): 1275–1297. doi:10.1023/a:1024224311289. PMID 12834268.
