= (S)-MK-26 =

Atypical dopamine reuptake inhibitor

Clinical data
- Drug class: Atypical dopamine reuptake inhibitor

Identifiers
- CAS Number: 2407547-18-4

Chemical and physical data
- Formula: C_{17}H_{13}Cl_{2}NOS_{2}
- Molar mass: 382.32 g·mol^{−1}
- 3D model (JSmol): Interactive image
- SMILES: C1=CC=C(Cl)C=C1C([S@@](=O)CC1SC=NC=1)C1=CC(Cl)=CC=C1
- InChI: InChI=1S/C17H13Cl2NOS2/c18-14-5-1-3-12(7-14)17(13-4-2-6-15(19)8-13)23(21)10-16-9-20-11-22-16/h1-9,11,17H,10H2/t23-/m0/s1; Key:WOJHQJWZRIRCQE-QHCPKHFHSA-N

(S)-MK-26 is an atypical dopamine reuptake inhibitor (DRI) that was derived from modafinil. It is closely related to two other modafinil analogues, (S,S)-CE-158 and (S)-CE-123.

(S)-MK-26 has markedly improved potency and selectivity as a blocker of the dopamine transporter (DAT) compared to modafinil (IC_{50} = 49 nM vs. 6,400 nΜ; 130-fold difference).

It has pro-motivational effects in animals and reverses tetrabenazine-induced motivational deficits and depression-like behavior. The drug dose-dependently increases extracellular dopamine levels in the nucleus accumbens and prefrontal cortex, does not modify locomotor activity (a measure of psychostimulant-like effect), and slightly enhances spatial memory in animals.

There has been interest in (S)-MK-26 as a potential treatment for depression, psychostimulant use disorder (PSUD), Alzheimer's disease, and aging-related disorders. It was first described by 2022.

== See also ==
- List of modafinil analogues and derivatives
- MRZ-9547
- PRX-14040
