= List of modafinil analogues and derivatives =

Chemical structure of modafinil.

This page lists chemical compounds similar to modafinil, known as modafinil analogues and derivatives. These are structural analogues and derivatives of modafinil, a drug that affects dopamine levels in the brain in an unusual way (atypical dopamine reuptake inhibitor or DRI). Modafinil is a drug that helps keep people awake and alert (wakefulness-promoting agent or "eugeroic").

Most of the listed modafinil analogues are drugs that specifically target dopamine reuptake (reabsorption of a neurotransmitter by a neurotransmitter transporter) with stronger effects (selective DRIs with improved potency) compared to modafinil. The modafinil analogues are of interest in the potential treatment of a condition involving the misuse of stimulant drugs (psychostimulant use disorder or PSUD), as drugs that help increase motivation (pro-motivational agents) to treat motivational disorders, and for treatment of neurodegenerative diseases such as Alzheimer's disease.

Modafinil analogues acting as DRIs include both drugs similar to modafinil that affect dopamine without causing stimulant effects (atypical modafinil-like non-psychostimulant DRIs) such as flmodafinil and JJC8-016 and drugs that affect dopamine in a way similar to cocaine (classical or typical cocaine-like DRIs) such as JJC8-088. Besides their potential medical use, modafinil analogues, including adrafinil, flmodafinil, fladrafinil, and modafiendz, are also sold online as substances that are believed to improve cognitive functions such as memory and focus (nootropics or "cognitive enhancers").

A limitation of some modafinil analogues such as JJC8-016 is blocking a specific protein (hERG) that can lead to heart problems (potent inhibition of the hERG antitarget and predicted cardiotoxicity).

== List of modafinil analogues and derivatives ==
- Adrafinil (Olmifon, CRL-40028, N-hydroxymodafinil) – prodrug of modafinil
- CE-103 – DRI
- CE-111 – DRI
- CE-123 (or as (S)-CE-123) – DRI
- CE-125 – DRI
- CE-158 (or as (S,S)-CE-158) – DRI
- Cinfenine – abandoned antidepressant and coronary vasodilator (similar in structure to JJC8-016)
- CT-005094 (CT-0050904) – atypical DRI
- CT-005404 (CT-5404) – atypical DRI
- Fladrafinil (CRL-40941, fluorafinil, bisfluoroadrafinil) – modafinil-like agent, little-characterized (but possible prodrug of flmodafinil)
- Flmodafinil (CRL-40940, NLS-4, JBG01-41, bisfluoromodafinil, lauflumide) – atypical DRI
  - (S)-(+)-Flmodafinil (JBG1-048) – atypical DRI
  - (R)-(–)-Flmodafinil (JBG1-049) – atypical DRI
- GC03-04 – DRI
- GC04-38 – DRI
- JJC8-016 – poorly selective atypical DRI
- JJC8-087 – DRI
- JJC8-088 – classical/typical or cocaine-like DRI
- JJC8-089 – DRI
- JJC8-091 – atypical DRI
- (S)-MK-26 – atypical DRI
- Modafiendz (methylbisfluoromodafinil) – modafinil-like agent, little-characterized
- Modafinil (Provigil, Alertec, Modavigil, CRL-40476) – atypical DRI, other actions
  - Armodafinil (Nuvigil, CRL-40982, CEP-10952, (R)-modafinil) – atypical DRI
  - Esmodafinil (CRL-40983, (S)-modafinil) – atypical DRI
- Modafinil acid (modafinilic acid, CRL-40467) – inactive metabolite of modafinil
- Modafinil sulfone (CRL-41056) – metabolite of modafinil with anticonvulsant effects but otherwise inactive
- PR-000608 (PR-608) – typical DRI
- RDS03-94 (RDS3-094) – atypical DRI
- RDS04-010 (RDS04-10, RDS4-010) – DRI

In addition to the above, further modafinil analogues have also been described.
