= CE-158 =

Chemical compound

Clinical data
- Other names: (S,S)-CE-158; S,S-CE-158
- Drug class: Atypical dopamine reuptake inhibitor

Identifiers
- IUPAC name: 5-(3-bromophenyl)-phenylmethyl sulfinylmethyl-1,3-thiazole
- CAS Number: 2621388-55-2
- PubChem CID: 156150588

Chemical and physical data
- Formula: C_{17}H_{14}BrNOS_{2}
- Molar mass: 392.33 g·mol^{−1}
- 3D model (JSmol): Interactive image
- SMILES: C1=CC=C(C=C1)C(C2=CC(=CC=C2)Br)S(=O)CC3=CN=CS3
- InChI: InChI=1S/C17H14BrNOS2/c18-15-8-4-7-14(9-15)17(13-5-2-1-3-6-13)22(20)11-16-10-19-12-21-16/h1-10,12,17H,11H2; Key:KWWHBBCVAQTAFQ-UHFFFAOYSA-N

CE-158 is an atypical dopamine reuptake inhibitor (DRI) that was derived from modafinil. It is often but not always referred to as the enantiopure enantiomer (S,S)-CE-158 instead.

CE-158 is a highly selective DRI with much greater potency than modafinil. As (S,S)-CE-158, its inhibitory potencies (IC_{50}) at the monoamine transporters are 227 nM at the dopamine transporter (DAT), 11,970 nM at the norepinephrine transporter (NET) (53-fold lower), and inactive at the serotonin transporter (SERT).

The drug shows pro-motivational effects in animals and reverses tetrabenazine-induced motivational deficits. It increases dopamine levels in the nucleus accumbens, blocks amphetamine-induced dopamine release in vitro, shows no effect on locomotor activity with acute or repeated administration except at a high dose, and enhances learning in animals.

CE-158 was first described by 2020. It is closely related to CE-123, an earlier modafinil analogue. CE-158 and related agents are of interest in the potential treatment of motivational disorders, psychostimulant use disorder (PSUD), and Alzheimer's disease.

== See also ==
- List of modafinil analogues and derivatives
- MRZ-9547
- PRX-14040
