= JJC8-089 =

Dopamine reuptake inhibitor related to modafinil

Clinical data
- Drug class: Dopamine reuptake inhibitor

Identifiers
- IUPAC name: 1-[4-[2-[bis(4-fluorophenyl)methylsulfanyl]ethyl]piperazin-1-yl]propan-2-ol
- CAS Number: 1627576-64-0
- PubChem CID: 90389439
- ChemSpider: 76721417
- ChEMBL: ChEMBL3916231

Chemical and physical data
- Formula: C_{22}H_{28}F_{2}N_{2}OS
- Molar mass: 406.54 g·mol^{−1}
- 3D model (JSmol): Interactive image
- SMILES: CC(CN1CCN(CC1)CCSC(C2=CC=C(C=C2)F)C3=CC=C(C=C3)F)O
- InChI: InChI=1S/C22H28F2N2OS/c1-17(27)16-26-12-10-25(11-13-26)14-15-28-22(18-2-6-20(23)7-3-18)19-4-8-21(24)9-5-19/h2-9,17,22,27H,10-16H2,1H3; Key:MQDDJWTVOBHYHX-UHFFFAOYSA-N

JJC8-089 is a dopamine reuptake inhibitor (DRI) that was derived from modafinil and is related to JJC8-016, JJC8-088, and JJC8-091. Its affinity (K_{i}) for the dopamine transporter (DAT) is 37.8 nM, for the norepinephrine transporter (NET) is 11,820 nM (313-fold lower than for the DAT), for the serotonin transporter (SERT) is 6,800 nM (180-fold lower than for the DAT), and for the sigma σ_{1} receptor is 2.24 nM (17-fold higher than for the DAT). It also has significant affinity for several dopamine receptors. JJC8-089 has substantially higher affinity for the DAT than modafinil. The drug shows pro-motivational effects in animals. It was first described in the scientific literature by 2016.

== See also ==
- List of modafinil analogues and derivatives
