= JJC8-091 =

Active component of a pharmaceutical drug

Clinical data
- Drug class: Atypical dopamine reuptake inhibitor

Identifiers
- IUPAC name: 1-[4-[2-[bis(4-fluorophenyl)methylsulfinyl]ethyl]piperazin-1-yl]propan-2-ol
- CAS Number: 1627576-76-4
- PubChem CID: 90389592
- ChemSpider: 76716308
- ChEMBL: ChEMBL3931765

Chemical and physical data
- Formula: C_{22}H_{28}F_{2}N_{2}O_{2}S
- Molar mass: 422.53 g·mol^{−1}
- 3D model (JSmol): Interactive image
- SMILES: CC(CN1CCN(CC1)CCS(=O)C(C2=CC=C(C=C2)F)C3=CC=C(C=C3)F)O
- InChI: InChI=1S/C22H28F2N2O2S/c1-17(27)16-26-12-10-25(11-13-26)14-15-29(28)22(18-2-6-20(23)7-3-18)19-4-8-21(24)9-5-19/h2-9,17,22,27H,10-16H2,1H3; Key:PHGOEMMHIGVMIN-UHFFFAOYSA-N

JJC8-091 is an atypical dopamine reuptake inhibitor (DRI) that was derived from modafinil. It is a lead compound for potential treatment of psychostimulant use disorder (PSUD) and is under development by Encepheal Therapeutics for use as a pharmaceutical drug.

The affinity (K_{i}) of JJC8-091 for the dopamine transporter (DAT) is 230 to 289 nM. In another study however, its affinities for the monoamine transporters were 16.7 nM for the DAT, 17,800 nM for the norepinephrine transporter (NET) (1,066-fold lower than for the DAT), and 1,770 nM for the serotonin transporter (SERT) (106-fold lower than for the DAT). It has substantially higher affinity for the DAT than modafinil (K_{i} = 2,600–8,160 nM). Besides the DAT, JJC8-091 is a sigma σ_{1} receptor ligand (K_{i} = 454–1,010 nM; 2.0–3.5-fold lower than for the DAT). It also has high affinity for the dopamine D_{2} and D_{3} receptors and lower affinity for the dopamine D_{4} receptor (K_{i} = 298 nM, 480 nM, and 3,820 nM, respectively).

JJC8-091 results in a mild, slow-onset, long-duration increase in dopamine levels in the nucleus accumbens in animals. The increases in nucleus accumbens dopamine levels with JJC8-091 are blunted relative to those with cocaine and JJC8-088 (a cocaine-like DRI) but are greater than those of JJC8-016 (an atypical DRI). JJC8-091 does not increase locomotor activity in animals, is not self-administered, and does not substitute for cocaine, suggesting very low addictive potential. Additionally, it reduces cocaine and methamphetamine self-administration, decreases escalation of methamphetamine intake, and blocks cocaine-induced reinstatement of drug-seeking behaviors. Unlike analogues including JJC8-088, JJC8-089, and RDS03-94, JJC8-091 did not show pro-motivational effects in animals.

JJC8-091 was first described in the scientific literature by 2016. It shows a favorable predicted drug-like profile in terms of metabolism and pharmacokinetics. However, JJC8-091, similarly to analogues like JJC8-016, has been found to exert hERG inhibition. In any case, modafinil and novel analogues like JJC8-091 are of interest in the potential treatment of PSUD.

== See also ==
- List of modafinil analogues and derivatives
