= JJC8-016 =

Abandoned drug

Clinical data
- Drug class: Atypical dopamine reuptake inhibitor

Identifiers
- IUPAC name: N-[2-[bis(4-fluorophenyl)methylsulfanyl]ethyl]-3-phenylpropan-1-amine
- CAS Number: 140890-64-8
- PubChem CID: 10430935
- ChemSpider: 8606362
- ChEMBL: ChEMBL3126735

Chemical and physical data
- Formula: C_{24}H_{25}F_{2}NS
- Molar mass: 397.53 g·mol^{−1}
- 3D model (JSmol): Interactive image
- SMILES: C1=CC=C(C=C1)CCCNCCSC(C2=CC=C(C=C2)F)C3=CC=C(C=C3)F
- InChI: InChI=1S/C24H25F2NS/c25-22-12-8-20(9-13-22)24(21-10-14-23(26)15-11-21)28-18-17-27-16-4-7-19-5-2-1-3-6-19/h1-3,5-6,8-15,24,27H,4,7,16-18H2; Key:IWZNOFWARONDLD-UHFFFAOYSA-N

JJC8-016 is an atypical dopamine reuptake inhibitor (DRI) derived from modafinil. It was an early lead in the development of novel modafinil analogues with improved properties for potential use in the treatment of psychostimulant use disorder (PSUD).

== Pharmacology ==
The affinities of JJC8-016 for the monoamine transporters are 114 nM for the dopamine transporter (DAT), 3850 nM for the norepinephrine transporter (NET) (34-fold lower than for the DAT), and 354 nM for the serotonin transporter (SERT) (3.1-fold lower than for the DAT). JJC8-016 also has high affinity for the dopamine D_{2} receptor (K_{i} = 228 nM), the dopamine D_{3} receptor (K_{i} = 65.9 nM), the dopamine D_{4} receptor (K_{i} = 28.1 nM), and the sigma σ_{1} receptor (K_{i} = 159 nM). It has much higher affinity for the DAT than modafinil (K_{i} = 2600 nM; 23-fold difference), but is also much less selective in comparison.

== Animal studies ==
JJC8-016 does significantly modify dopamine levels in the nucleus accumbens, does not produce cocaine- or psychostimulant-like effects, and is not self-administered in animals. As such, it shows a profile of low misuse liability. Its actions are in contrast to modafinil and other analogues, which do significantly increase nucleus accumbens dopamine levels, albeit much less robustly than cocaine. JJC8-016 has been found to blunt cocaine-mediated increases in dopamine levels in the nucleus accumbens, to dose-dependently block the psychostimulant-like effects of cocaine, to block self-administration of cocaine, and to prevent cocaine-induced reinstatement of drug-seeking behavior in animals. It has also been found to reduce methamphetamine self-administration and escalation of its intake.

== Preclinical development ==
JJC8-016 was under investigation for the potential treatment of PSUD. However, it was abandoned following findings that it interacts with high affinity at the hERG antitarget (IC_{50} = 60 nM) and thereby would be predicted to produce cardiotoxicity. This was also the reason for the abandonment of vanoxerine (GBR-12909), a structurally distinct atypical DRI that was in clinical trials for PSUD. In addition to its hERG affinity, JJC8-016 was described as having poor metabolic and pharmacokinetic characteristics. Subsequently, more selective modafinil-derived DAT blockers, like JJC8-088 and JJC8-091, were developed. JJC8-088 has ~90-fold higher affinity for the DAT than JJC8-016 and ~2-fold lower affinity for the hERG. Newer related modafinil analogues and DRIs with further reduced affinity for the hERG were also subsequently developed.

JJC8-016 was first described in the scientific literature by 2014. However, the actual compound itself was first mentioned in a patent that dates back to 1992.

== See also ==
- List of modafinil analogues and derivatives
