= C17H15NOS2 =

The molecular formula C_{17}H_{15}NOS_{2} (molar mass : 313.43 g/mol) may refer to:

- CE-103
- CE-123
