= RDS03-94 =

Experimental drug for stimulant use disorder

Clinical data
- Other names: RDS3-094

Identifiers
- IUPAC name: 1-[(2S,6R)-4-[2-[bis(4-fluorophenyl)methylsulfanyl]ethyl]-2,6-dimethylpiperazin-1-yl]propan-2-ol
- CAS Number: 2324108-96-3
- PubChem CID: 150357965
- ChEMBL: ChEMBL4636778

Chemical and physical data
- Formula: C_{24}H_{32}F_{2}N_{2}OS
- Molar mass: 434.59 g·mol^{−1}
- 3D model (JSmol): Interactive image
- SMILES: C[C@@H]1CN(C[C@@H](N1CC(C)O)C)CCSC(C2=CC=C(C=C2)F)C3=CC=C(C=C3)F
- InChI: InChI=1S/C24H32F2N2OS/c1-17-14-27(15-18(2)28(17)16-19(3)29)12-13-30-24(20-4-8-22(25)9-5-20)21-6-10-23(26)11-7-21/h4-11,17-19,24,29H,12-16H2,1-3H3/t17-,18+,19?; Key:GVCYHQGCEQPNRF-DFNIBXOVSA-N

RDS03-94, or RDS3-094, is an atypical dopamine reuptake inhibitor that was derived from the wakefulness-promoting agent modafinil.

It has substantially higher affinity and potency in terms of dopamine transporter (DAT) inhibition than modafinil (K_{i} = 39.4 nM vs. 8,160 nM) whilst retaining the atypical DAT blocker profile of modafinil. However, RDS03-94 also has high affinity for the sigma σ_{1} receptor (K_{i} = 2.19 nM).

RDS03-94 shows some reversal of tetrabenazine-induced motivational deficits in animals and hence may have the capacity to produce pro-motivational effects. However, it appears to be less effective than certain other related agents, like JJC8-088.

RDS03-94 is under development for the treatment of psychostimulant use disorder. The drug was first described in the scientific literature in 2020.

== See also ==
- List of modafinil analogues and derivatives
