= Motivation-enhancing drug =

Drug increasing motivation in humans

- Drug class
- Dextroamphetamine, one of the most widely used motivation-enhancing drugs.

Class identifiers
- Synonyms: Motivation-enhancing agent; Motivation-enhancing medication; Pro-motivational drug; Pro-motivational agent; Pro-motivational medication
- Use: To increase motivation and treat disorders of diminished motivation

Legal status

A motivation-enhancing drug, also known as a pro-motivational drug, is a drug which increases motivation. Drugs enhancing motivation can be used in the treatment of motivational deficits, for instance in depression, schizophrenia, and attention deficit hyperactivity disorder (ADHD). They can also be used in the treatment of disorders of diminished motivation (DDMs), including apathy, abulia, and akinetic mutism, disorders that can be caused by conditions like stroke, traumatic brain injury (TBI), and neurodegenerative diseases. Motivation-enhancing drugs are used non-medically by healthy people to increase motivation and productivity as well, for instance in educational contexts.

There is limited clinical data about medications for treating motivational deficits and disorders. In any case, drugs used for pro-motivational purposes are generally dopaminergic agents, for instance dopamine reuptake inhibitors (DRIs) like methylphenidate and modafinil, dopamine releasing agents (DRAs) like amphetamine, and other dopaminergic medications. Adenosine receptor antagonists, like caffeine and istradefylline, can also produce pro-motivational effects. Acetylcholinesterase inhibitors, like donepezil, have been used as well.

Some drugs do not appear to increase motivation and can actually have anti-motivational effects. Examples of these drugs include selective serotonin reuptake inhibitors (SSRIs), selective norepinephrine reuptake inhibitors (NRIs), and antipsychotics (which are dopamine receptor antagonists or partial agonists). Cannabinoids, for instance those found in cannabis, have also been associated with motivational deficits.

== Dopaminergic agents ==
Dopaminergic agents that have been found to produce pro-motivational effects in animals and/or humans include the following:

- Dopamine reuptake inhibitors (DRIs) like bupropion, CE-123, CE-158, CT-005404, JJC8-088, JJC8-089, methylphenidate, (S)-MK-26, modafinil, MRZ-9547 ((R)-phenylpiracetam), nomifensine, PRX-14040, pyrovalerone, RDS03-94, and vanoxerine (GBR-12909)
- Dopamine releasing agents (DRAs) like amphetamine, methamphetamine, and lisdexamfetamine
- Dopamine D_{1} receptor agonists like SKF-81297 and PF-06412562 (CVL-562)
- Dopamine precursors like levodopa (L-DOPA)
- Catecholaminergic activity enhancers (CAEs) like selegiline (L-deprenyl), PPAP, and BPAP

=== Other dopaminergic agents ===
Dopamine D_{2}-like receptor agonists, including pramipexole, ropinirole, rotigotine, piribedil, bromocriptine, cabergoline, pergolide, and lisuride, have also been used to treat disorders of diminished motivation in humans. The clinical data on these agents for this use is very limited, but therapeutic successes have been reported. D_{2}-like receptor agonists are known to have sedative-like and non-rewarding effects in humans. In any case, dopamine D_{2}-like receptor antagonists, like haloperidol and other antipsychotics, are known to produce anti-motivational effects in animals and humans. Bromocriptine has been reported to improve anergia and motivation in humans in very limited clinical reports. On the other hand, pergolide failed to show pro-motivational effects in animals.

Other dopaminergic drugs that have been used or suggested in the treatment of disorders of diminished motivation include rasagiline (a selective monoamine oxidase B (MAO-B) inhibitor; but see more below), tolcapone (a centrally-acting catechol-O-methyltransferase (COMT) inhibitor), and amantadine (an indirectly acting dopaminergic agent that acts via unknown mechanisms). Tolcapone, the only marketed COMT inhibitor that is centrally acting (as opposed to peripherally selective), shows antidepressant- and anti-anhedonia-like effects, stimulates exploratory behavior, and enhances the locomotor hyperactivity induced by psychostimulants like amphetamine and nomifensine in animals. Amantadine is widely used to treat multiple sclerosis-related fatigue, among other fatigue- and motivation-related disorders, and is recommended by the United Kingdom National Institute for Health and Care Excellence (NICE) guidelines for this use, though clinical data are limited.

Although typical doses of dopamine D_{2} and D_{3} receptor antagonists reduce dopaminergic neurotransmission and produce anti-motivational effects, low doses of some of these drugs can preferentially block presynaptic dopamine D_{2} and D_{3} autoreceptors and thereby increase dopamine levels and enhance dopaminergic signaling. Examples of dopamine D_{2} and D_{3} receptor antagonists which have been used in this way include amisulpride, sulpiride, and ENX-104. At low doses resulting in dopamine D_{2} and D_{3} receptor occupancy levels of 10 to 50%, ENX-104 produced enhanced reward responsiveness, an anti-anhedonia-like effect, in rodents, whereas high doses achieving 65 to 80% occupancy resulted in antipsychotic-like effects, and further higher doses producing greater than 80% occupancy induced catalepsy. In addition to the preceding effects, ENX-104 has been found to augment amphetamine-induced dopamine release in rodents.

=== Mechanistic aspects of specific dopaminergic agents ===
Dopamine levels and signaling in the nucleus accumbens, part of the ventral striatum and the mesolimbic reward pathway, are thought to play a key role in mediating behavioral activation and motivation. Dopamine releasing agents like dextroamphetamine are able to rapidly increase striatal dopamine levels by 700 to 1,500% of baseline in rodents. These drugs show greater magnitudes of impact on dopamine levels than do dopamine reuptake inhibitors like methylphenidate. In addition, whereas dopamine reuptake inhibitors show a clear dose–effect ceiling in their effects on dopamine levels, dopamine releasing agents do not and have been found to maximally increase dopamine levels by more than 5,000%. Atypical dopamine reuptake inhibitors like modafinil can also increase dopamine levels in the striatum and nucleus accumbens in animals, but have further reduced impacts on dopamine levels compared to psychostimulants like amphetamine and methylphenidate.

=== Limitations of specific dopaminergic agents ===
A limitation of certain dopaminergic medications used to improve motivation, like psychostimulants, is development of tolerance to their effects. Rapid acute tolerance to amphetamines is believed to be responsible for the dissociation between their relatively short durations of action (~4 hours for main desired effects) and their much longer elimination half-lives (~10 hours) and durations in the body (~2 days). It appears that continually increasing or ascending concentration–time curves are beneficial for prolonging effects, which has resulted in administration multiple times per day and development of delayed- and extended-release formulations. Drug holidays and breaks can be helpful in resetting tolerance.

Another possible limitation of amphetamine specifically is dopaminergic neurotoxicity, which might occur even at therapeutic doses.

A limitation of bupropion as a dopaminergic agent is that it achieves very limited clinical occupancy of the dopamine transporter (DAT).

== Adenosinergic agents ==
Adenosine receptor antagonists, including caffeine, istradefylline (KW-6002), Lu AA47070, MSX-3, MSX-4, preladenant (SCH-420814), and theophylline, have shown pro-motivational effects in animals and humans. Caffeine and theophylline act as non-selective antagonists of the adenosine receptors (including A_{1}, A_{2A}, A_{2B}, and A_{3}). Conversely, agents like istradefylline and preladenant are selective adenosine A_{2A} receptor antagonists. Adenosine A_{2A} receptor antagonists, including the non-selective antagonists like caffeine, show pro-motivational effects in animals, whereas selective adenosine A_{1} receptor antagonists, like DPCPX and CPX, do not. Adenosine A_{2A} receptor antagonists appear to exert their pro-motivational effects in the nucleus accumbens core and can reverse the anti-motivational effects of dopamine D_{2} receptor antagonists like haloperidol in animals. Istradefylline is approved in the treatment of Parkinson's disease and has been found to improve symptoms of apathy, anhedonia, and depression in people with the condition.

== Cholinergic agents ==
Acetylcholinesterase inhibitors, like donepezil, rivastigmine, and galantamine, have been used in the treatment of disorders of diminished motivation. These drugs inhibit acetylcholinesterase, which metabolizes the neurotransmitter acetylcholine, thereby increasing acetylcholine levels in the brain and augmenting activation of the muscarinic acetylcholine and nicotinic acetylcholine receptors. They are approved and used in the treatment of Alzheimer's disease and provide modest cognitive improvements in people with the disease. Although acetylcholinesterase inhibitors have been used to treat disorders of diminished motivation, the muscarinic acetylcholine receptor agonist pilocarpine has actually shown anti-motivational effects in animals that can be reversed by the muscarinic acetylcholine receptor antagonist scopolamine. In addition, xanomeline, a muscarinic acetylcholine M_{1} and M_{4} receptor agonist, shows indirect antidopaminergic effects in the mesolimbic pathway in animals and, in combination with trospium, is approved as an antipsychotic in the treatment of schizophrenia. Furthermore, scopolamine has been found to reverse the anti-motivational effects of the dopamine D_{2} receptor antagonist haloperidol in animals. In any case, in spite of the preceding findings, acetylcholinesterase inhibitors have been found to be clinically effective, albeit modestly, for apathy in dementia and Parkinson's disease.

== Other agents ==
=== Serotonin 5-HT_{2A} receptor agonists ===
The DOx serotonergic psychedelic 2,5-dimethoxy-4-propylamphetamine (DOPR), which acts as an agonist of the serotonin 5-HT_{2A}, 5-HT_{2B}, and 5-HT_{2C} receptors, has shown pro-motivational effects in rodents at sub-hallucinogenic doses or so-called "microdoses". DOPR's close analogue 2,5-dimethoxy-4-ethylamphetamine (DOET) has also been clinically studied at sub-hallucinogenic doses as a "psychic energizer". The non-hallucinogenic 4C analogue Ariadne (4C-DOM) has indirect dopaminergic effects in rodents and pro-motivational effects in monkeys as well. ASR-2001 (2CB-5PrO), a non-hallucinogenic TWEETIO analogue of the related 2C serotonergic psychedelic 2C-B, is under development for use as a stimulant-like medication for the treatment of psychiatric disorders. AB-300, another non-hallucinogenic serotonin 5-HT_{2A} receptor agonist and Ariadne-related drug, has also been reported to produce pro-motivational effects in rodents and is under development for potential medical use to treat apathy in Parkinson's disease. In addition to the preceding, certain psychedelics like 2C-B, 2C-D, DOM, DOET, 5-MeO-DiPT, 5-MeO-MiPT, and LSD, among others, have mild stimulant-like effects in humans.

=== Serotonin 5-HT_{2C} receptor antagonists ===
Serotonin 5-HT_{2C} receptor antagonists, such as SB-242084, show pro-motivational effects in animals. In addition, SB-242084 has shown modest stimulant-like and reinforcing effects in monkeys. In accordance with the preceding, serotonin 5-HT_{2C} receptor antagonists like SB-242084 and SB-206553 have been found to increase dopamine levels in the nucleus accumbens.

Agomelatine is a potent melatonin MT_{1} and MT_{2} receptor agonist and weak serotonin 5-HT_{2B} and 5-HT_{2C} receptor antagonist that is marketed as an antidepressant. It has been found to increase norepinephrine and dopamine levels in the frontal cortex in rodents, though notably not in the striatum or nucleus accumbens (in contrast to other serotonin 5-HT_{2C} receptor antagonists), and for this reason has sometimes been described as a "norepinephrine–dopamine disinhibitor" ("NDDI"). Due to its indirect dopaminergic effects, the drug has been suggested as a possible treatment for disorders of diminished motivation like anhedonia and abulia. It has been found to be effective in the treatment of apathy in people with dementia and was reported to reverse escitalopram-associated apathy in a case report. However, the serotonin 5-HT_{2C} receptor antagonism of typical clinical doses of agomelatine in humans has been questioned and is controversial.

=== GPR139 agonists ===
The GPR139 agonist zelatriazin (TAK-041; NBI-1065846) has shown pro-motivational effects in animals. On the basis of these findings, it has been speculated that the drug might be useful in the treatment of apathy in humans. Zelatriazin was under development for the treatment of anhedonia in major depressive disorder and the negative symptoms of schizophrenia and reached phase 3 clinical trials. However, its development was discontinued due to lack of clinical effectiveness.

=== Anti-inflammatory drugs ===
The tumor necrosis factor α (TNF-α) monoclonal antibody infliximab has been found to increase motivation in people with depression with high inflammation (as measured by high C-reactive protein levels). It has also been found to reduce symptoms of depression and anhedonia, for instance in people with high inflammation.

=== Miscellaneous ===
Pirepemat (IRL752) and linepemat (possibly IRL757) are under study for potential pro-motivational effects and/or treatment of apathy.

== Ineffective agents ==
=== Serotonergic and noradrenergic agents ===
Selective serotonin reuptake inhibitors (SSRIs) like escitalopram and norepinephrine reuptake inhibitors (NRIs) like atomoxetine have been used and recommended in the treatment of disorders of diminished motivation. However, SSRIs like fluoxetine and citalopram, NRIs like desipramine and atomoxetine, and MAO-A-inhibiting monoamine oxidase inhibitors (MAOIs) like moclobemide and pargyline, have all not shown pro-motivational effects in animals. In fact, these drugs can produce further motivational deficits in animals. Serotonergic antidepressants like SSRIs and serotonin–norepinephrine reuptake inhibitors (SNRIs) have also been implicated in inducing apathy and emotional blunting in humans. Activation of the serotonin 5-HT_{2C} receptor by serotonergic agents like SSRIs may contribute to or mediate their anti-motivational effects, whereas co-administration of serotonin 5-HT_{2C} receptor antagonists may reverse the effects.

=== Selective MAO-B inhibitors ===
In contrast to selegiline, selective MAO-B inhibitors without concomitant catecholaminergic activity enhancer (CAE) actions, like rasagiline, SU-11739, and lazabemide, are poorly effective in reversing behavioral deficits induced by the dopamine depleting agent tetrabenazine in animals.

=== Dopamine receptor antagonists and partial agonists ===
Antipsychotics, which classically act as dopamine receptor antagonists (mostly of the D_{2}-like receptors), are well-known as having robust and dose-dependent anti-motivational effects. In fact, these effects may play a key role in their effectiveness against the positive and psychotic symptoms of schizophrenia by blunting emotions including those underlying delusions.

A more recent class of antipsychotics, sometimes referred to as third-generation antipsychotics, act as dopamine D_{2}-like receptor partial agonists instead of as pure antagonists, and hence have mixed agonistic and antagonistic effects. These drugs include aripiprazole, brexpiprazole, and cariprazine. Low doses of aripiprazole have been suggested by some authors as a possible treatment for disorders of diminished motivation. However, similarly to dopamine D_{2} receptor antagonists, aripiprazole and cariprazine showed anti-motivational effects in animals and failed to reverse the motivational deficits induced by the dopamine depleting agent tetrabenazine. In fact, aripiprazole further worsened the motivational impairments caused by tetrabenazine. In other animal studies, aripiprazole also showed other anti-motivational-like effects such as antagonism of amphetamine- and apomorphine-induced hyperlocomotion and stereotypy and induction of catalepsy. In accordance with the preceding findings, aripiprazole reduced activation of the mesolimbic motivational pathway in humans similarly to but less robustly than haloperidol.

Different dopamine receptor partial agonists that are used in the treatment of schizophrenia are known to vary in their intrinsic activities at the dopamine receptors, so each drug of this class may be expected to have a different profile of effects.

=== Certain atypical dopamine reuptake inhibitors ===
Some atypical DRIs, like JJC8-091, in contrast to other DRIs, are not effective in producing pro-motivational effects in animals. This has been attributed to binding to an occluded conformation of the dopamine transporter (DAT) that results in a diminished increase in dopamine levels.

== Researchers ==
John D. Salamone is a major researcher studying motivation, dopamine, and motivation-enhancing drugs.

== See also ==
- Disorders of diminished motivation § Treatment
- Tetrabenazine § Animal model of motivational dysfunction
- Locomotor activity § Drugs affecting locomotor activity
- Conditioned avoidance response test § Test of other drug effects
- List of investigational fatigue drugs
