= Eugeroic =

Drug for wakefulness and alertness

- Drug class
- The chemical structure of modafinil, the prototypical drug of this class

Class identifiers
- Synonyms: Eugrégorique; Eugregorique; Eugregoric; Vigilance-promoting agent
- Use: To increase wakefulness and arousal, to reduce sleepiness and sedation
- ATC code: N06B

Legal status

A eugeroic, or eugregoric, is a type of drug that increases wakefulness. The term has been used inconsistently and in multiple ways in the scientific literature, either to refer specifically to modafinil-type wakefulness-promoting agents or to refer to wakefulness-promoting agents generally. It was first introduced in the French literature in 1987 as a descriptor for modafinil-like wakefulness-promoting drugs and for purposes of distinguishing such drugs from psychostimulants. However, the term "eugeroic" has not been widely adopted in the literature, and instead the term "wakefulness-promoting agent" (and variations thereof) has been more widely used, both for modafinil-type drugs and other agents.

Eugeroics, in the sense of modafinil-type wakefulness promoting agents, include modafinil itself, armodafinil, and adrafinil, among others. They are medically indicated for the treatment of certain sleep disorders, including excessive daytime sleepiness (EDS) in narcolepsy or obstructive sleep apnea (OSA). Eugeroics are also often prescribed off-label for the treatment of EDS in idiopathic hypersomnia. In contrast to classical psychostimulants, such as amphetamine and methylphenidate, which are also used in the treatment of these disorders, eugeroics typically do not produce euphoria, and, consequently, have lower misuse potential.

Modafinil and armodafinil are thought to act as selective, weak, atypical dopamine reuptake inhibitors (DRIs). However, additional actions are also possible and have not been ruled out. Adrafinil acts as a prodrug of modafinil and hence shares its mechanism of action. Certain other drugs acting as atypical DRIs with known or potential wakefulness-promoting effects include solriamfetol (also a norepinephrine reuptake inhibitor), vanoxerine, phenylpiracetam, and mesocarb. Other wakefulness-promoting agents act in a variety of other ways.

== List of eugeroics ==
=== Marketed ===
- Armodafinil (Nuvigil, CRL-40982, CEP-10952, (R)-modafinil) – the (R)-enantiomer of modafinil
- Modafinil (Provigil, Alertec, Modavigil, CRL-40476) – a racemic mixture of armodafinil and esmodafinil
- Solriamfetol (Sunosi).
- Pitolisant (Wakix).
- Oveporexton (Orzeyful)

=== Discontinued ===
- Adrafinil (Olmifon, CRL-40028, N-hydroxymodafinil) – a hydroxy-substituted derivative and prodrug of modafinil

=== Never marketed ===
- Esmodafinil (CRL-40983, (S)-modafinil) – the (S)-enantiomer of modafinil
- Fladrafinil (CRL-40941, fluorafinil, bisfluoroadrafinil) – a bisfluoro-substituted derivative of adrafinil
- Flmodafinil (CRL-40940, NLS-4, JBG01-41, bisfluoromodafinil, lauflumide) – a bisfluoro-substituted derivative of modafinil
- Fluorenol ("hydrafinil") – a novel eugeroic structurally unrelated to modafinil and its analogues
- Modafiendz (methylbisfluoromodafinil) – a methyl and bisfluoro-substituted derivative of modafinil

== Novel eugeroics ==
The pharmaceutical company Cephalon, the original United States market rights holder of modafinil, has demonstrated initiative in the development of a successor to the prototypical eugeroic. Of the more than twenty compounds preclinically tested in Cephalon's three-part drug discovery series, the compound fluorenol was selected as a lead. Fluorenol was found to induce wakefulness to a greater degree than modafinil, despite possessing a lower affinity for the dopamine transporter (DAT). Many other modafinil analogues have also subsequently been developed, not specifically as wakefulness-promoting agents but for treatment of conditions like psychostimulant use disorder and motivational disorders.
