= CE-103 =

Dopamine reuptake inhibitor, modafinil analogue

- CE-103

Legal status
- Legal status: UK: Under Psychoactive Substances Act

Identifiers
- IUPAC name: 2-(benzhydrylsulfinylmethyl)-1,3-thiazole
- PubChem CID: 118871454
- ChemSpider: 70673926
- ChEMBL: ChEMBL4453674

Chemical and physical data
- Formula: C_{17}H_{15}NOS_{2}
- Molar mass: 313.43 g·mol^{−1}
- 3D model (JSmol): Interactive image
- SMILES: O=S(CC1=NC=CS1)C(C2=CC=CC=C2)C3=CC=CC=C3
- InChI: InChI=InChI=1S/C17H15NOS2/c19-21(13-16-18-11-12-20-16)17(14-7-3-1-4-8-14)15-9-5-2-6-10-15/h1-12,17H,13H2; Key:MMCRZMXHSNGINW-UHFFFAOYSA-N

CE-103 is an analog of modafinil, a member of a series of structurally related heterocyclic derivatives.

CE-103 inhibits dopamine reuptake with an IC50 of 14.73 μM, an IC50 of 420.1 μM at the norepinephrine transporter (NET), while its effect on serotonin transporter (SERT) is negligible, therefore it is a modestly selective dopamine reuptake inhibitor. Sprague Dawley rats given CE-103 at doses 1 and 10 mg/kg showed an increased working memory index in a radial arm maze. Administration of the compound also decreased levels of complexes containing phosphorylated dopamine transporter (pDAT) and D1 receptor, while significantly increasing levels of complexes containing D2 receptor and D3 receptor.

It is closely related to CE-123, being a positional isomer.

== See also ==
- List of modafinil analogues and derivatives
- CE-125
