= JHW-007 =

Atypical dopamine reuptake inhibitor

Identifiers
- IUPAC name: (1R,5S)-3-[bis(4-fluorophenyl)methoxy]-8-butyl-8-azabicyclo[3.2.1]octane
- CAS Number: 264869-07-0
- PubChem CID: 10091491
- ChemSpider: 1125316
- ChEMBL: ChEMBL3084652

Chemical and physical data
- Formula: C_{24}H_{29}F_{2}NO
- Molar mass: 385.499 g·mol^{−1}
- 3D model (JSmol): Interactive image
- SMILES: CCCCN1[C@@H]2CC[C@H]1CC(C2)OC(C3=CC=C(C=C3)F)C4=CC=C(C=C4)F
- InChI: InChI=1S/C24H29F2NO/c1-2-3-14-27-21-12-13-22(27)16-23(15-21)28-24(17-4-8-19(25)9-5-17)18-6-10-20(26)11-7-18/h4-11,21-24H,2-3,12-16H2,1H3/t21-,22+,23?; Key:HZEVDVGPBUFIAW-AIZNXBIQSA-N

JHW-007 is a cocaine analogue and a high affinity atypical dopamine reuptake inhibitor that is being researched for the treatment of cocaine addiction. JHW-007 has been found to blunt the psychostimulant effects of cocaine and reduce self-administration in rodents. JHW-007 exposure has been shown to block the conditioned place preference effects of cocaine. JHW-007 may directly antagonize the autoregulatory dopamine D_{2} receptor, a hypothesis that was developed following the observation of JHW-007's ability to inhibit D_{2} receptor-mediated currents in the midbrain.

== Atypical dopamine reuptake inhibition ==
In contrast to cocaine and other cocaine-like dopamine reuptake inhibitors, JHW-007 binds to the dopamine transporter (DAT) in an occluded (closed) conformation, similar to (R)-modafinil. This type of receptor binding to the DAT has been observed to result in a gradual and sustained increase in extracellular dopamine in the nucleus accumbens. Peak levels of extracellular dopamine are also markedly reduced. Both modafinil and JHW-007 have been investigated for the treatment of cocaine addiction.
