= C25H27NO =

The molecular formula C_{25}H_{27}NO (molar mass: 343.47 g/mol) may refer to:

- JWH-185
- Cinfenine
- N-Desmethyltamoxifen
