= CT-005404 =

Chemical compound

Clinical data
- Other names: CT-5404
- Drug class: Atypical dopamine reuptake inhibitor; Pro-motivational agent

CT-005404, or CT-5404, is an atypical dopamine reuptake inhibitor (DRI) that was derived from modafinil. It shows pro-motivational effects in animals and reverses motivational deficits induced by tetrabenazine and interleukin-1β. CT-005404 is described as being orally active in animals and having a long duration of action. It is under development by Chronos Therapeutics for treatment of motivational disorders. The drug was first described by 2018.

== See also ==
- List of modafinil analogues and derivatives
- MRZ-9547
- PRX-14040
