= Rs28363170 =

Genetic variation in the SLC6A3 gene

SNP: rs28363170
- Gene: SLC6A3
- Chromosome: 5

External databases
- Ensembl: Human SNPView
- dbSNP: 28363170
- HapMap: 28363170
- SNPedia: 28363170

In genetics, rs28363170 (DAT1-VNTR) is a genetic variation at SLC6A3, the gene that encodes the dopamine transporter. It is polymorphism as a 40 base pairs VNTR in the 3' untranslated region. It is a deletion/insertion polymorphism (DIP).

The 9-repeat and the 10-repeat are the most common alleles.
