= CE-125 =

Dopamine reuptake inhibitor, modafinil analogue

- CE-125

Legal status
- Legal status: UK: Under Psychoactive Substances Act

Identifiers
- IUPAC name: 4-((benzhydrylsulfinyl)methyl)-2-cyclopropylthiazole
- PubChem CID: 118871456

Chemical and physical data
- Formula: C_{20}H_{19}NOS_{2}
- Molar mass: 353.50 g·mol^{−1}
- 3D model (JSmol): Interactive image
- SMILES: O=S(CC1=CSC(C2CC2)=N1)C(C3=CC=CC=C3)C4=CC=CC=C4
- InChI: InChI=1S/C20H19NOS2/c22-24(14-18-13-23-20(21-18)17-11-12-17)19(15-7-3-1-4-8-15)16-9-5-2-6-10-16/h1-10,13,17,19H,11-12,14H2; Key:USSBQUDPPUTTQY-UHFFFAOYSA-N

CE-125 is an analog of modafinil, a member of a series of structurally related heterocyclic derivatives.

CE-125 is a selective dopamine reuptake inhibitor, with IC50 of the monoamine transporters being 4.1 ± 0.8 μM at the dopamine transporter (DAT), 687.2 ± 152.8 μM at the norepinephrine transporter (NET), and 436.1 ± 129 μM at the serotonin transporter (SERT). Rats given CE-125 at doses 1 and 10 mg/kg increased the working memory index in a radial arm maze. The compound also altered dopaminergic signaling in rat frontal cortex. D1 receptor protein levels were significantly reduced in trained and treated animals, while D2 receptor levels remained unchanged.

CE-125 and related compounds are studied as potential treatment of motivational disorders and Alzheimer's disease.

== See also ==
- List of modafinil analogues and derivatives
