= Cinfenine =

Abandoned antidepressant

Clinical data
- Drug class: Antidepressant; Coronary vasodilator

Identifiers
- IUPAC name: (E)-N-(2-benzhydryloxyethyl)-N-methyl-3-phenylprop-2-en-1-amine
- CAS Number: 54141-87-6
- PubChem CID: 6443800
- ChemSpider: 4947762
- UNII: P26FL0O04P
- ChEMBL: ChEMBL2104102
- CompTox Dashboard (EPA): DTXSID101023894

Chemical and physical data
- Formula: C_{25}H_{27}NO
- Molar mass: 357.497 g·mol^{−1}
- 3D model (JSmol): Interactive image
- SMILES: CN(CCOC(C1=CC=CC=C1)C2=CC=CC=C2)C/C=C/C3=CC=CC=C3
- InChI: InChI=1S/C25H27NO/c1-26(19-11-14-22-12-5-2-6-13-22)20-21-27-25(23-15-7-3-8-16-23)24-17-9-4-10-18-24/h2-18,25H,19-21H2,1H3/b14-11+; Key:QTKQVDXGCWKEHE-SDNWHVSQSA-N

Cinfenine (INN) is a drug described as an antidepressant and coronary vasodilator which was never marketed. It was first described in the literature by 1970. The drug is similar in chemical structure to the modafinil derivative and atypical dopamine reuptake inhibitor JJC8-016, as well as to the antihistamine and anticholinergic diphenhydramine and derivatives of diphenhydramine like ebastine. Other notable analogues acting as dopamine reuptake inhibitors have been synthesized as well.

== See also ==
- List of modafinil analogues and derivatives
