= Off-target activity =

Drug biological activity

Off-target activity is biological activity of a drug that is different from and not directed at that of its intended biological target. It most commonly contributes to side effects. However, in some cases, off-target activity can be taken advantage of for therapeutic purposes.

An example of this is the repurposing of the antimineralocorticoid and diuretic spironolactone, which was found to produce feminization and gynecomastia as side effects, for use as an antiandrogen in the treatment of androgen-dependent conditions like acne and hirsutism in women.

Metformin also causes off-target activity.

== See also ==
- Antitarget
