= SoRI-20041 =

Chemical compound

Identifiers
- IUPAC name: N-(3,3-diphenylpropyl)-2-phenyl-4-quinazolinamine
- CAS Number: 488082-05-9
- PubChem CID: 44310972
- ChemSpider: 23162486
- ChEMBL: ChEMBL72735
- CompTox Dashboard (EPA): DTXSID301030073

Chemical and physical data
- Formula: C_{29}H_{25}N_{3}
- Molar mass: 415.540 g·mol^{−1}
- 3D model (JSmol): Interactive image
- SMILES: c2ccccc2C(c3ccccc3)CCNc(nc4-c5ccccc5)c1ccccc1n4
- InChI: InChI=1S/C29H25N3/c1-4-12-22(13-5-1)25(23-14-6-2-7-15-23)20-21-30-29-26-18-10-11-19-27(26)31-28(32-29)24-16-8-3-9-17-24/h1-19,25H,20-21H2,(H,30,31,32); Key:HQPGYRVHOIKOIE-UHFFFAOYSA-N

SoRI-20041 is an "antagonist-like" allosteric modulator of amphetamine-induced dopamine release (in contrast to the related research chemicals SoRI-9804 and SoRI-20040, which are "agonist-like"). SoRI-20041 is believed to be the first example of a drug that separately modulates uptake versus release in the dopamine transporter (possibly showing how inward and outward transport represent distinct operational modes of DAT); it produces the same effects as SoRI-20040 and SoRI-9804 in uptake assays and binding assays, inhibiting the re-uptake of dopamine, but does not modulate d-amphetamine-induced DA release by inhibiting that as well, like 'agonists' of the series do.

This suggests the possibility of simultaneous action and increase of indirect-agonism through the dual action of DRA and DRI efficacy existing together. This increases the inhibition of re-uptake at synaptic dopamine concentrations without interfering in the flow of release of dopamine from amphetaminergic phosphorylation at the affected transporter. This overcomes the obstacle of a compromised binding site that would be rendered unusable through the action of amphetamine. Conventional dopamine re-uptake inhibitors (such as cocaine or methylphenidate) would otherwise ineffectively target such a site on each specific transporter so affected by amphetamine, making this an example of a DRI that does not have a mutually exclusive functionality against DRA action at individual instances of DAT.
