= SoRI-9804 =

Names
- Preferred IUPAC name N-(Diphenylmethyl)-2-phenylquinazolin-4-amine
- Other names Benzhydryl-(2-phenyl-quinazolin-4-yl)-amine; 4-((Diphenylmethyl)amino)-2-phenylquinazoline

Identifiers
CAS Number	434326-29-1
3D model (JSmol)	Interactive image
ChEMBL	ChEMBL305876
ChemSpider	8105784
PubChem CID	9930153
CompTox Dashboard (EPA)	DTXSID401045758
- InChI: InChI=1S/C27H21N3/c1-4-12-20(13-5-1)25(21-14-6-2-7-15-21)29-27-23-18-10-11-19-24(23)28-26(30-27)22-16-8-3-9-17-22/h1-19,25H,(H,28,29,30) Key: LJIQXEUCYVPWRY-UHFFFAOYSA-N
- SMILES: C1=CC=C(C=C1)C2=NC3=CC=CC=C3C(=N2)NC(C4=CC=CC=C4)C5=CC=CC=C5

Properties
Chemical formula	C_{27}H_{21}N_{3}
Molar mass	387.486 g·mol^{−1}
- Except where otherwise noted, data are given for materials in their standard state (at 25 °C [77 °F], 100 kPa). Infobox references

SoRI-9804 is a positive allosteric modulator of dopamine transporters. Unlike others in its series & traditional DRI ligands, it inhibits the release of dopamine in addition to inhibiting the reuptake of released dopamine back into the transporter.

== See also ==
- SoRI-20041
