= Modafiendz =

Wakefulness-promoting drug related to modafinil

Clinical data
- Other names: N-Methyl-4,4-difluoromodafinil; Methyldifluoromodafinil; N-Methylbisfluoromodafinil; Bisfluoro-N-methylmodafinil; Methylflmodafinil

Identifiers
- IUPAC name: 2-[bis(4-fluorophenyl)methylsulfinyl]-N-methylacetamide
- CAS Number: 1613222-54-0
- PubChem CID: 132989661
- ChemSpider: 58951582
- UNII: 223VWC34TA
- CompTox Dashboard (EPA): DTXSID501342547

Chemical and physical data
- Formula: C_{16}H_{15}F_{2}NO_{2}S
- Molar mass: 323.36 g·mol^{−1}
- 3D model (JSmol): Interactive image
- SMILES: CNC(=O)CS(=O)C(C1=CC=C(C=C1)F)C2=CC=C(C=C2)F
- InChI: InChI=1S/C16H15F2NO2S/c1-19-15(20)10-22(21)16(11-2-6-13(17)7-3-11)12-4-8-14(18)9-5-12/h2-9,16H,10H2,1H3,(H,19,20); Key:MQZWTCIUDSDFCQ-UHFFFAOYSA-N

Modafiendz, also known as N-methyl-4,4-difluoromodafinil or as N-methylbisfluoromodafinil, is a wakefulness-promoting agent related to modafinil that was never marketed. It is sold online and used non-medically as a nootropic (cognitive enhancer).

Modafiendz is the bis-fluoro and N-methylated derivative of modafinil as well as the N-methyl analogue of flmodafinil (CRL-40,940; bisfluoromodafinil) and fladrafinil (CRL-40,941; bisfluoroadrafinil).

Modafinil and its analogues have been found to act as selective dopamine reuptake inhibitors and this is thought to be involved in their wakefulness-promoting effects.

== See also ==
- List of modafinil analogues and derivatives
