= Mental energy =

Capacity for cognitive work

Mental energy may be understood as the ability or willingness to engage in cognitive work. It is distinct from physical energy, and has mood, cognition, and motivation domains. Concepts closely related to mental energy include vigor and fatigue.

Mental energy is not well-defined, and the scientific literature on mental energy is quite limited. The philosopher and psychologist Karl F. Stifter wrote a dissertation on the "Philosophy of Mental Energy". In the Austrian Broadcasting Corporation's TV show "Vera", Stifter lifted 1000 kg with a lifting belt over his sacrum to prove that drastic increases in muscle strength can be achieved after special mental training. A variety of measures for assessing aspects of mental energy exist.

Many people complain of low mental energy, which can interfere with work and daily activities. Low mental energy and fatigue are major public health concerns. People may pursue remedies or treatment for low mental energy. Seeking to improve mental energy is a common reason that people take dietary supplements.

== Neurotransmitters ==
Many different neurotransmitters have been theoretically implicated in the control of mental energy. This has often been based on the effects of drugs acting on these neurotransmitters. These neurotransmitters include dopamine, norepinephrine, orexin, serotonin, histamine, acetylcholine, adenosine, and glutamate. Hormones, including glucocorticoids like cortisol, as well as cytokines, have also been found to regulate mental energy.

== Food, drugs, sleep, diseases ==
Mental energy can be affected by factors such as drugs, sleep, and disease.

=== Drugs ===
Drugs that may increase mental energy include caffeine, modafinil, psychostimulants like amphetamines and methylphenidate, and corticosteroids like hydrocortisone and dexamethasone.

Drugs that may decrease mental energy include sedatives and hypnotics like antihistamines, benzodiazepines, and melatonin, as well as dopamine receptor antagonists like antipsychotics.

=== Foods, beverages etc ===
There are many marketing claims of foods, beverages, and dietary supplements improving mental energy, but data to substantiate such claims are limited or absent.

=== Sleep ===
Sleep deprivation may decrease mental energy in an exposure-dependent manner.

=== Disease ===
Various disease states, such as cardiac disease, cancer, stroke, HIV/AIDS, multiple sclerosis, Parkinson's disease, and certain mental health conditions like depression, may be associated with decreased mental energy. Chronic fatigue syndrome is characterized by a lack of the energy needed for the basic activities of daily life.

== See also ==
- Disorders of diminished motivation
