= PRX-14040 =

Dopamine reuptake inhibitor

Clinical data
- Other names: PRX14040
- Drug class: Dopamine reuptake inhibitor; Pro-motivational agent

Identifiers
- IUPAC name: 5-(2-(1-(3,4-dichlorophenyl)cyclobutyl)-2-hydroxyethyl)-2-oxa-5-azoniabicyclo[2.2.1]heptane chloride
- CAS Number: 1664382-90-4
- PubChem CID: 117903522

Chemical and physical data
- Formula: C_{17}H_{22}Cl_{3}NO_{2}
- Molar mass: 378.72 g·mol^{−1}
- 3D model (JSmol): Interactive image
- SMILES: C1CC(C1)(C2=CC(=C(C=C2)Cl)Cl)C(C[NH+]3CC4CC3CO4)O.[Cl-]
- InChI: InChI=1S/C17H21Cl2NO2.ClH/c18-14-3-2-11(6-15(14)19)17(4-1-5-17)16(21)9-20-8-13-7-12(20)10-22-13;/h2-3,6,12-13,16,21H,1,4-5,7-10H2;1H; Key:QAHXUHUHCQYFHC-UHFFFAOYSA-N

PRX-14040 is a selective dopamine reuptake inhibitor that was developed by Prexa Pharmaceuticals. It has 28-fold selectivity for the dopamine transporter over the norepinephrine transporter. Similarly to various other dopamine reuptake inhibitors, the drug has been found to reverse motivational deficits induced by the dopamine depleting agent tetrabenazine in animals.

== See also ==
- CT-005404
- MRZ-9547
