= CE-123 =

Designer drug, analog of modafinil

- (S)-CE-123

Clinical data
- Other names: (S)-CE-123; S-CE-123

Legal status
- Legal status: UK: Under Psychoactive Substances Act

Identifiers
- IUPAC name: (S)-5-(benzhydrylsulfinylmethyl)-1,3-thiazole
- CAS Number: 1879038-73-9 (S)-CE-123: 2378384-49-5
- PubChem CID: 118871455
- ChemSpider: 110407278
- UNII: 2P6T8SD99L
- ChEMBL: ChEMBL4456176
- CompTox Dashboard (EPA): DTXSID201337030

Chemical and physical data
- Formula: C_{17}H_{15}NOS_{2}
- Molar mass: 313.43 g·mol^{−1}
- 3D model (JSmol): Interactive image
- SMILES: O=S(Cc1cncs1)C(c2ccccc2)c3ccccc3
- InChI: InChI=1S/C17H15NOS2/c19-21(12-16-11-18-13-20-16)17(14-7-3-1-4-8-14)15-9-5-2-6-10-15/h1-11,13,17H,12H2; Key:VBBBWHDWYLUSEL-UHFFFAOYSA-N

CE-123, or as the active enantiomer (S)-CE-123, is an analog of modafinil, the most researched of a series of structurally related heterocyclic derivatives. In animal studies, CE-123 was found to improve performance on tests of learning and memory in a manner consistent with a nootropic effect profile. (S)-CE-123 has pro-motivational effects in animals, reverses tetrabenazine-induced motivational deficits, and could be useful in the treatment of motivational disorders in humans.

== See also ==
- List of modafinil analogues and derivatives
- JZ-IV-10
