= JJC8-088 =

Cocaine-like dopamine reuptake inhibitor derived from modafinil

Clinical data
- Drug class: Typical dopamine reuptake inhibitor; Psychostimulant
- ATC code: None

Identifiers
- IUPAC name: 1-[4-[2-[bis(4-fluorophenyl)methylsulfinyl]ethyl]piperazin-1-yl]-3-phenylpropan-2-ol
- CAS Number: 1627576-82-2
- PubChem CID: 118643968
- ChemSpider: 76717749
- ChEMBL: ChEMBL3918282

Chemical and physical data
- Formula: C_{28}H_{32}F_{2}N_{2}O_{2}S
- Molar mass: 498.63 g·mol^{−1}
- 3D model (JSmol): Interactive image
- SMILES: C1CN(CCN1CCS(=O)C(C2=CC=C(C=C2)F)C3=CC=C(C=C3)F)CC(CC4=CC=CC=C4)O
- InChI: InChI=1S/C28H32F2N2O2S/c29-25-10-6-23(7-11-25)28(24-8-12-26(30)13-9-24)35(34)19-18-31-14-16-32(17-15-31)21-27(33)20-22-4-2-1-3-5-22/h1-13,27-28,33H,14-21H2; Key:MACFTPBZAOCTFN-UHFFFAOYSA-N

JJC8-088 is a dopamine reuptake inhibitor (DRI) and psychostimulant that was derived from the wakefulness-promoting agent modafinil.

It has substantially higher affinity for the dopamine transporter (DAT) than modafinil (K_{i} = 6.72 nM vs. 2,600 nM; 387-fold). In contrast to modafinil and other analogues, which are atypical DRIs, JJC8-088 is a typical or cocaine-like DRI. It has potent cocaine-like psychostimulant effects, produces robust and dose-dependent increases in dopamine levels in the nucleus accumbens, is readily self-administered, and substitutes for cocaine in animals.

Similarly to cocaine, but unlike modafinil and other analogues, JJC8-088 stabilizes the DAT in an outward-facing open conformation. It has been theorized that cocaine-like DRIs may actually act as dopamine releasing agent-like DAT "inverse agonists" rather than as simple transporter blockers.

In addition to its affinity for the DAT, JJC8-088 has low affinity for the serotonin transporter (SERT) (K_{i} = 213 nM; 32-fold less than for the DAT) and for the norepinephrine transporter (NET) (K_{i} = 1,950 nM; 290-fold less than for the DAT). It also binds with high affinity to the sigma σ_{1} receptor (K_{i} = 41.6 nM).

The drug has high affinity for the hERG antitarget (IC_{50} = 130 nM) and hence has the potential to be highly cardiotoxic, which could cause serious cardiovascular complications such as heart attack if JJC8-088 were to be used recreationally. Despite this, JJC8-088 emerged as a "nootropic" and novel designer drug online in July 2026. However, anecdotal user reports have suggested that the drug produces no significant effects across several routes of administration, possibly due to poor bioavailability.

== See also ==
- List of modafinil analogues and derivatives
- JZ-IV-10
- PR-000608
