= Antitarget =

Concept in pharmacology

In pharmacology, an antitarget (or off-target) is a receptor, enzyme, or other biological target that, when affected by a drug, causes undesirable side-effects. During drug design and development, it is important for pharmaceutical companies to ensure that new drugs do not show significant activity at any of a range of antitargets, most of which are discovered largely by chance.

Among the best-known and most significant antitargets are the hERG channel and the 5-HT_{2B} receptor, both of which cause long-term problems with heart function that can prove fatal (long QT syndrome and cardiac fibrosis, respectively), in a small but unpredictable proportion of users. Both of these targets were discovered as a result of high levels of distinctive side-effects during the marketing of certain medicines, and, while some older drugs with significant hERG activity are still used with caution, most drugs that have been found to be strong 5-HT_{2B} agonists were withdrawn from the market, and any new compound will almost always be discontinued from further development if initial screening shows high affinity for these targets.

Agonism of the 5-HT_{2A} receptor is an antitarget because 5-HT_{2A} receptor agonists are associated with hallucinogenic effects. According to David E. Nichols, "Discussions over the years with many colleagues working in the pharmaceutical industry have informed me that if upon screening a potential new drug is found to have serotonin 5-HT_{2A} agonist activity, it nearly always signals the end to any further development of that molecule." There are some exceptions however, for instance efavirenz and lorcaserin, which can activate the 5-HT_{2A} receptor and cause psychedelic effects at high doses.

The growth of the field of chemoproteomics has offered a variety of strategies to identify off-targets on a proteome wide scale.

== See also ==
- Off-target activity
