= MRZ-9547 =

Pharmaceutical drug

Clinical data
- Other names: (R)-Phenylpiracetam; (R)-Phenotropil; (R)-Fenotropil; (R)-Fonturacetam; Arfonturacetam; N-Carbamoylmethyl-4(R)-phenyl-2-pyrrolidinone
- Drug class: Atypical dopamine reuptake inhibitor; Pro-motivational agent

Identifiers
- IUPAC name: 2-[(4R)-2-oxo-4-phenylpyrrolidin-1-yl]acetamide
- CAS Number: 949925-07-9
- PubChem CID: 781883
- ChemSpider: 683574
- UNII: X4X99EKB3S

Chemical and physical data
- Formula: C_{12}H_{14}N_{2}O_{2}
- Molar mass: 218.256 g·mol^{−1}
- 3D model (JSmol): Interactive image
- SMILES: C1[C@@H](CN(C1=O)CC(=O)N)C2=CC=CC=C2
- InChI: InChI=1S/C12H14N2O2/c13-11(15)8-14-7-10(6-12(14)16)9-4-2-1-3-5-9/h1-5,10H,6-8H2,(H2,13,15)/t10-/m0/s1; Key:LYONXVJRBWWGQO-JTQLQIEISA-N

MRZ-9547, also known as (R)-phenylpiracetam, (R)-phenotropil, or (R)-fonturacetam, is a selective dopamine reuptake inhibitor (IC_{50} = 14.5 μM) that was developed by Merz Pharma. It is the (R)-enantiomer of the racetam and nootropic phenylpiracetam (phenotropil; fonturacetam).

The drug was under development for the treatment of fatigue associated with Parkinson's disease and was in phase 1 clinical trials for this indication in June 2014. However, no recent development has been reported as of November 2017. There was also interest in MRZ-9547 for treatment of fatigue in people with depression and other conditions, but this was not pursued.

Similarly to other dopamine reuptake inhibitors and related agents, MRZ-9547 has been found to have pro-motivational effects in animals and to reverse motivational deficits induced by the dopamine depleting agent tetrabenazine.

The drug, as the enantiopure (R)-enantiomer of phenylpiracetam, was first described in the scientific literature by 2014.

== See also ==
- Armesocarb
- CT-005404
- PRX-14040
- List of Russian drugs
