= Stimulant =

Drug that increases alertness

- Drug class
- Chemical structure of amphetamine, one of the most well-known and widely used stimulants.

Class identifiers
- Synonyms: Psychostimulant; Central nervous system stimulant; CNS stimulant; Upper
- Use: Recreational, medical
- Mechanism of action: Various
- Biological target: Various
- Chemical class: Various

Legal status
- Legal status: Variable

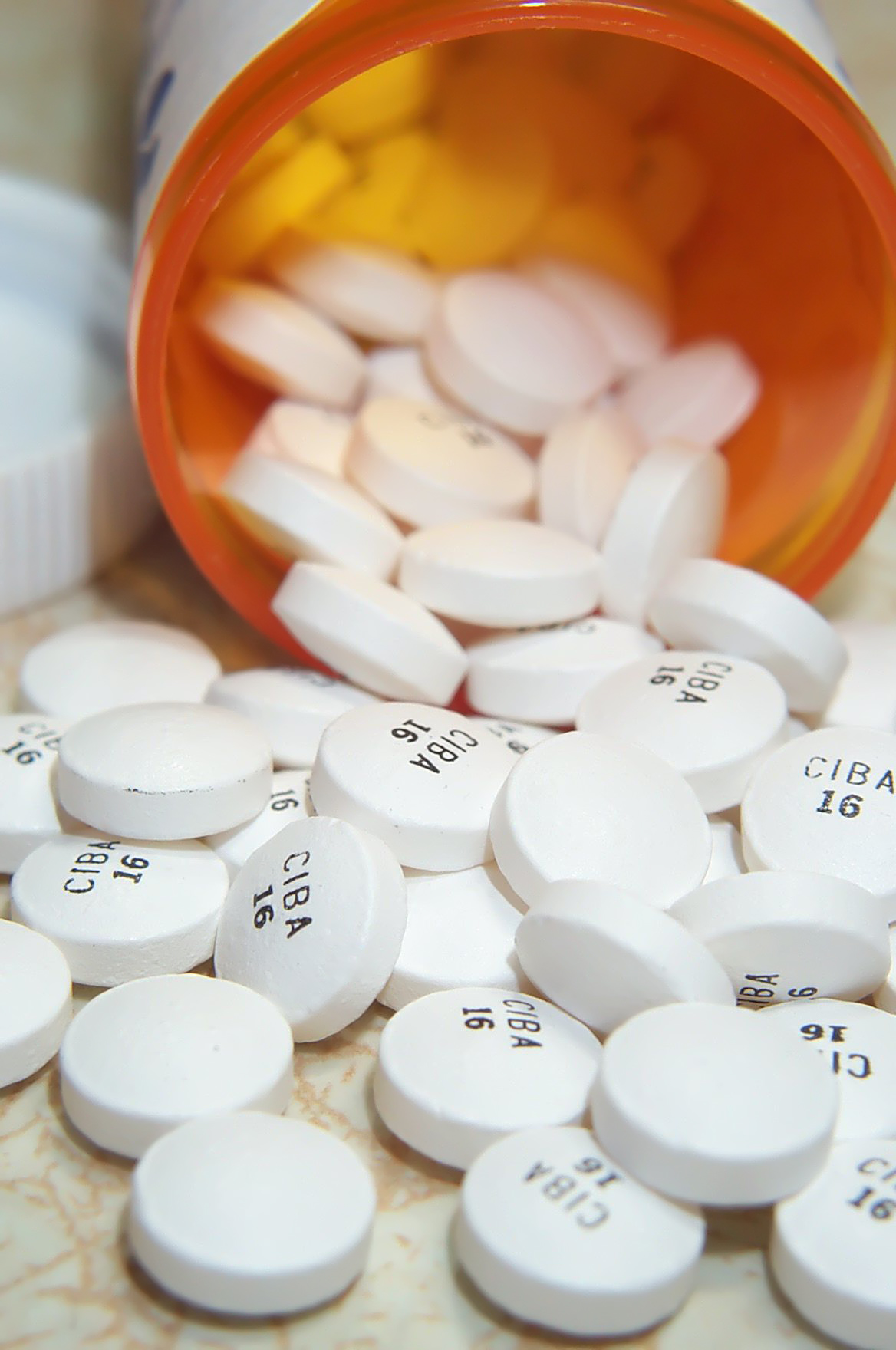
Ritalin SR (methylphenidate): 20 mg sustained-release tablets

Stimulants (also called as central nervous system stimulant, psychostimulant, or colloquially an upper) are a class of psychoactive drugs that increase alertness. They are used for various purposes, such as enhancing attention, motivation, cognition, mood, and physical activity. Some stimulants occur in nature while others are synthetic. Common stimulants include caffeine, nicotine, cocaine, amphetamine, methamphetamine, methylphenidate, and modafinil. Some stimulants are subject to governmental regulation or prohibition because they can have adverse side effects including addiction, drug tolerance, drug withdrawal, psychosis, anxiety, insomnia, cardiovascular disease, and neurotoxicity. The misuse or abuse of stimulants can have serious adverse health and social consequences, such as overdose, substance dependence, crime, and violent behavior.

Stimulants increase activity in the sympathetic nervous system. They often increase synaptic concentrations of excitatory neurotransmitters, particularly norepinephrine and dopamine. Other stimulants work by binding to the receptors of excitatory neurotransmitters (e.g., nicotine) or by blocking the activity of endogenous agents that promote sleep (e.g., caffeine). Stimulants can affect various functions, including arousal, attention, the reward system, learning, memory, and emotion. Effects range from mild stimulation to euphoria, depending on the specific drug, dose, route of administration, and inter-individual characteristics.

Stimulants have a long history of use, both for medical and non-medical purposes. Archeological evidence from Peru shows that cocaine use dates back as far as 8000 B.C.E. Stimulants have been used to treat various conditions, such as narcolepsy, attention deficit hyperactivity disorder (ADHD), obesity, depression, and fatigue. They have also been used as recreational drugs, performance-enhancing substances, cognitive enhancers, and to promote aggression of combatants in wartime.

== Definition ==
Stimulant is an overarching term that covers many drugs including those that increase the activity of the central nervous system and the body, drugs that are pleasurable and invigorating, or drugs that have sympathomimetic effects. Sympathomimetic effects are those effects that mimic or copy the actions of the sympathetic nervous system. The sympathetic nervous system is a part of the nervous system that prepares the body for action, such as increasing the heart rate, blood pressure, and breathing rate. Stimulants can activate the same receptors as the natural chemicals released by the sympathetic nervous system (namely epinephrine and norepinephrine) and cause similar effects.

Psychostimulant refers to a subset of substances within the stimulant drug class that act at the dopamine transporter (DAT), a protein that normally clears dopamine from the synaptic cleft. Amphetamine, methylphenidate, cocaine, and modafinil are examples of psychostimulants that promote arousal and affect task performance in a dose-dependent manner. Psychostimulants act at DAT by inhibiting dopamine reuptake or by initiating transporter-mediated dopamine efflux (i.e., reverse transport), thereby producing indirect dopamine agonist effects in the central nervous system. The DAT-mediated actions of psychostimulants contrast with other central nervous system stimulants that can overlap in behavioural effects, such as caffeine, a drug that promotes wakefulness primarily through antagonism of adenosine receptors.

== Effects ==
=== Acute ===
Stimulants in low doses, such as those prescribed to treat attention deficit hyperactivity disorder (ADHD), increase ability to focus, vigor, sociability, wakefulness, libido and may elevate mood or cause euphoria. However, in higher doses, stimulants may actually decrease the ability to focus, a principle of the Yerkes–Dodson law.

Many, but not all, stimulants have ergogenic effects; that is, they enhance physical performance. Drugs such as ephedrine, pseudoephedrine, amphetamine, and methylphenidate have well documented ergogenic effects, while cocaine has the opposite effect.

Neurocognitive enhancing effects of stimulants, specifically modafinil, amphetamine, and methylphenidate have been reported in healthy adolescents by some studies, and is a commonly cited reason among illicit drug users for use, particularly among college students in the context of studying. Still, results of these studies is inconclusive: assessing the potential overall neurocognitive benefits of stimulants among healthy youth is challenging due to the diversity within the population, the variability in cognitive task characteristics, and the absence of replication of studies. Research on the cognitive enhancement effects of modafinil in healthy non-sleep-deprived individuals has yielded mixed results, with some studies suggesting modest improvements in attention and executive functions while others show no significant benefits or even a decline in cognitive functions.

In some cases, psychiatric phenomena may emerge such as stimulant psychosis, paranoia, and suicidal ideation. Acute toxicity has been reportedly associated with hyperhidrosis, panic attacks, severe anxiety, mydriasis, paranoia, aggressive behavior, psychosis, rhabdomyolysis, and punding. The violent and aggressive behavior associated with acute stimulant toxicity may partially be driven by paranoia. Most drugs classified as stimulants are sympathomimetic, meaning that they stimulate the sympathetic branch of the autonomic nervous system. This stimulation leads to effects such as mydriasis (dilation of the pupils), increased heart rate, blood pressure, respiratory rate and body temperature. When these changes become pathological, they are called arrhythmia, hypertension, and hyperthermia, and may lead to rhabdomyolysis, stroke, cardiac arrest, or seizures. However, given the complexity of the mechanisms that underlie these potentially fatal outcomes of acute stimulant toxicity, it is impossible to determine what dose may be lethal.

=== Chronic ===
Assessment of the effects of stimulants is relevant given the large population currently taking stimulants. A 2022 meta-analysis with a sample size of just under four million people found no association between the use of prescription stimulants and the development of cardiovascular disease in any age group. A review of a year long period of prescription stimulant use in those with attention deficit hyperactivity disorder (ADHD) found that cardiovascular side effects were limited to transient increases in blood pressure only. However, a 2024 systematic review of the evidence found that stimulants overall improve ADHD symptoms and broadband behavioral measures in children and adolescents, though they carry risks of side effects like appetite suppression and other adverse events. Initiation of stimulant treatment in those with ADHD in early childhood appears to carry benefits into adulthood in social and cognitive functioning, and appears to be relatively safe.

Abuse of prescription stimulants (not following physician instruction) or of illicit stimulants carries many negative health risks. Abuse of cocaine, depending upon route of administration, increases risk of cardiorespiratory disease, stroke, and sepsis. Some effects are dependent upon the route of administration, with intravenous use associated with the transmission of many disease such as hepatitis C, HIV/AIDS, and potential medical emergencies such as infection, thrombosis, or pseudoaneurysm, while inhalation may be associated with increased lower respiratory tract infection, lung cancer, and pathological restricting of lung tissue. Cocaine may also increase risk for autoimmune disease and damage nasal cartilage. Abuse of methamphetamine produces similar effects as well as marked degeneration of dopaminergic neurons, resulting in an increased risk for Parkinson's disease.

== Medical uses ==
Stimulants are widely used throughout the world as prescription medicines as well as without a prescription (either legally or illicitly) as performance-enhancing or recreational drugs. Stimulants produce a noticeable crash or comedown at the end of their effects. In the US, the most frequently prescribed stimulants as of 2013 were lisdexamfetamine (Vyvanse), methylphenidate (Ritalin), and amphetamine (Adderall). It was estimated in 2015 that the percentage of the world population that had used cocaine during a year was 0.4%. For the category "amphetamines and prescription stimulants" (with "amphetamines" including amphetamine and methamphetamine) the value was 0.7%, and for MDMA 0.4%.

Stimulants have been used in medicine for many conditions including obesity, sleep disorders, mood disorders, impulse-control disorders, asthma, nasal congestion and, in case of cocaine, as local anesthetics. Drugs used to treat obesity are called anorectics and generally include drugs that follow the general definition of a stimulant, but other drugs such as cannabinoid receptor antagonists also belong to this group. Eugeroics are used in management of sleep disorders characterized by excessive daytime sleepiness, such as narcolepsy, and include stimulants such as modafinil and pitolisant. Stimulants are used in impulse control disorders such as ADHD and off-label in mood disorders such as major depressive disorder to increase energy, focus, and elevate mood. Stimulants such as epinephrine, theophylline, and salbutamol orally have been used to treat asthma, but inhaled adrenergic drugs are now preferred due to less systemic side effects. Pseudoephedrine is used to relieve nasal or sinus congestion caused by the common cold, sinusitis, allergic rhinitis, and other respiratory allergies; it is also used to relieve ear congestion caused by ear inflammation or infection.

=== Depression ===
Stimulants were one of the first classes of drugs to be used in the treatment of major depressive disorder, beginning after the introduction of the amphetamines in the 1930s. However, they were largely abandoned for treatment of depression following the introduction of conventional antidepressants in the 1950s. Subsequent to this, there has been a resurgence in interest in stimulants for depression in recent years.

Stimulants produce a fast-acting and pronounced but transient and short-lived mood lift. In relation to this, they are minimally effective in the treatment of depression when administered continuously. In addition, tolerance to the mood-lifting effects of amphetamine has led to dose escalation and dependence. Although the efficacy for depression with continuous administration is modest, it may still reach statistical significance over placebo and provide benefits similar in magnitude to those of conventional antidepressants. The reasons for the short-term mood-improving effects of stimulants are unclear, but may relate to rapid tolerance. Tolerance to the effects of stimulants has been studied and characterized both in animals and humans. Stimulant withdrawal is remarkably similar in its symptoms to those of major depressive disorder.

== Chemistry ==
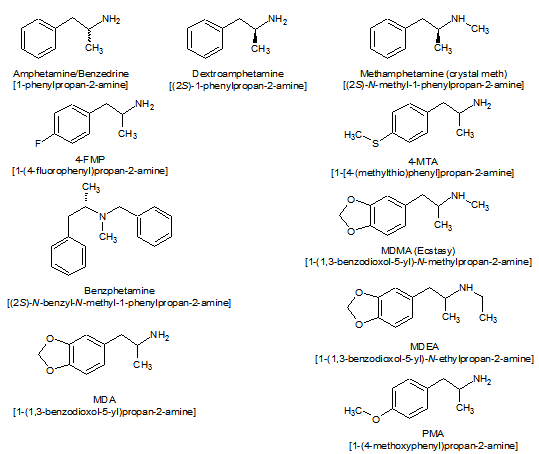
A chart comparing the chemical structures of different amphetamine derivatives

Classifying stimulants is difficult, because of the large number of classes the drugs occupy, and the fact that they may belong to multiple classes; for example, ecstasy can be classified as a substituted methylenedioxyphenethylamine, a substituted amphetamine and consequently, a substituted phenethylamine.

Major stimulant classes include phenethylamines and their daughter class substituted amphetamines.

=== Amphetamines (class) ===
Substituted amphetamines are a class of compounds based upon the amphetamine structure; it includes all derivative compounds which are formed by replacing, or substituting, one or more hydrogen atoms in the amphetamine core structure with substituents. Examples of substituted amphetamines are amphetamine (itself), methamphetamine, ephedrine, cathinone, phentermine, mephentermine, bupropion, methoxyphenamine, selegiline, amfepramone, pyrovalerone, MDMA (ecstasy), and DOM (STP). Many drugs in this class work primarily by activating trace amine-associated receptor 1 (TAAR1); in turn, this causes reuptake inhibition and effluxion, or release, of dopamine, norepinephrine, and serotonin. An additional mechanism of some substituted amphetamines is the release of vesicular stores of monoamine neurotransmitters through VMAT2, thereby increasing the concentration of these neurotransmitters in the cytosol, or intracellular fluid, of the presynaptic neuron.

Amphetamine-type stimulants are often used for their therapeutic effects. Physicians sometimes prescribe amphetamine to treat major depressive disorder, where subjects do not respond well to traditional selective serotonin reuptake inhibitor (SSRI) medications, but evidence supporting this use is mixed. Two large phase III studies of lisdexamfetamine (a prodrug to amphetamine) as an adjunct to an SSRI or serotonin–norepinephrine reuptake inhibitor (SNRI) in the treatment of major depressive disorder showed no further benefit relative to placebo in effectiveness. Numerous studies have demonstrated the effectiveness of drugs like Adderall (a mixture of salts of amphetamine and dextroamphetamine) in controlling symptoms associated with ADHD. Non-stimulants such as atomoxetine have also found to be effective. Due to their availability and fast-acting effects, substituted amphetamines are prime candidates for abuse.

=== Cocaine analogs ===
Hundreds of cocaine analogs have been created, all of them usually maintaining a benzyloxy connected to the 3 carbon of a tropane. Various modifications include substitutions on the benzene ring, as well as additions or substitutions in place of the normal carboxylate on the tropane 2 carbon. Various compound with similar structure activity relationships to cocaine that aren't technically analogs have been developed as well.

== Mechanisms of action ==
Most stimulants exert their activating effects by enhancing catecholamine neurotransmission. Catecholamine neurotransmitters are employed in regulatory pathways implicated in attention, arousal, motivation, task salience and reward anticipation. Classical stimulants either block the reuptake or stimulate the efflux of these catecholamines, resulting in increased activity of their circuits. Some stimulants, specifically those with entactogenic and hallucinogenic effects, also affect serotonergic transmission. Some stimulants, such as some amphetamine derivatives and yohimbine, can decrease negative feedback by antagonizing regulatory autoreceptors. Adrenergic agonists, such as, in part, ephedrine, act by directly binding to and activating adrenergic receptors, producing sympathomimetic effects.

There are also more indirect mechanisms of action by which a drug can elicit activating effects. Caffeine is an adenosine receptor antagonist, and only indirectly increases catecholamine transmission in the brain. Pitolisant is an histamine 3 (H_{3})-receptor inverse agonist. As histamine 3 (H_{3}) receptors mainly act as autoreceptors, pitolisant decreases negative feedback to histaminergic neurons, enhancing histaminergic transmission.

The precise mechanism of action of some stimulants, such as modafinil, for treating symptoms of narcolepsy and other sleep disorders, remains unknown.

== Notable stimulants ==
=== Amphetamine ===
Amphetamine is a potent psychostimulant of the phenethylamine class that is approved for the treatment of attention deficit hyperactivity disorder (ADHD) and narcolepsy. Amphetamine is also used off-label as a performance and cognitive enhancer, and recreationally as an aphrodisiac and euphoriant. Although it is a prescription medication in many countries, unauthorized possession and distribution of amphetamine is often tightly controlled due to the significant health risks associated with uncontrolled or heavy use. As a consequence, amphetamine is illegally manufactured in clandestine labs to be trafficked and sold to users. Based upon drug and drug precursor seizures worldwide, illicit amphetamine production and trafficking is much less prevalent than that of methamphetamine.

The first pharmaceutical amphetamine was Benzedrine, a brand of inhalers used to treat a variety of conditions. Because the dextrorotary isomer has greater stimulant properties, Benzedrine was gradually discontinued in favor of formulations containing all or mostly dextroamphetamine. Presently, it is typically prescribed as mixed amphetamine salts, dextroamphetamine, and lisdexamfetamine.

Amphetamine is a norepinephrine–dopamine releasing agent (NDRA). It enters neurons through dopamine and norepinephrine transporters and facilitates neurotransmitter efflux by activating TAAR1 and inhibiting VMAT2. At therapeutic doses, this causes emotional and cognitive effects such as euphoria, change in libido, increased arousal, and improved cognitive control. Likewise, it induces physical effects such as decreased reaction time, fatigue resistance, and increased muscle strength. In contrast, supratherapeutic doses of amphetamine are likely to impair cognitive function and induce rapid muscle breakdown. Very high doses can result in psychosis (e.g., delusions and paranoia), which very rarely occurs at therapeutic doses even during long-term use. As recreational doses are generally much larger than prescribed therapeutic doses, recreational use carries a far greater risk of serious side effects, such as dependence, which only rarely arises with therapeutic amphetamine use.

=== Caffeine ===
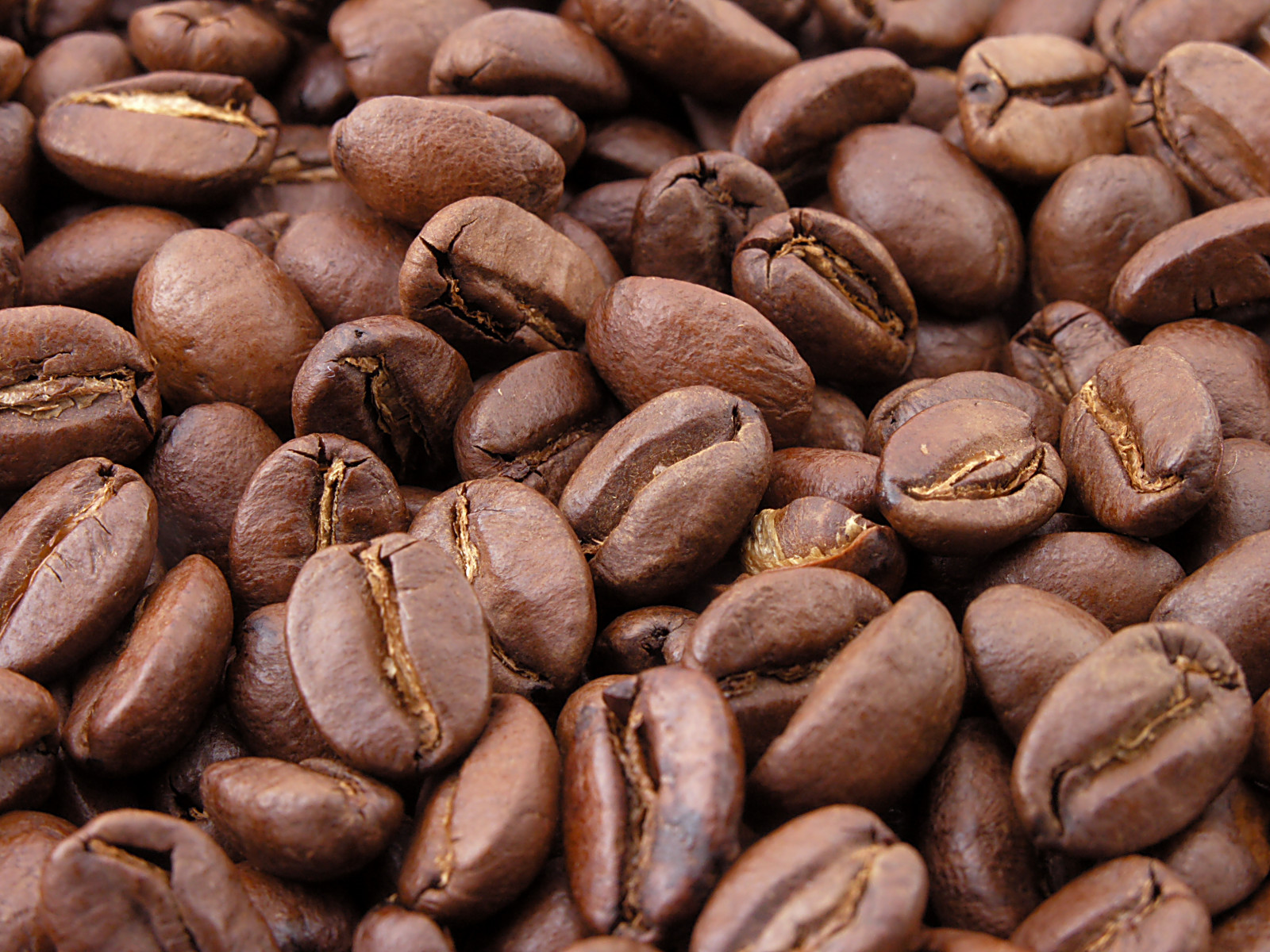
Roasted coffee beans, a common source of caffeine.

Caffeine is a stimulant compound belonging to the xanthine class of chemicals naturally found in coffee, tea, and (to a lesser degree) cocoa or chocolate. Caffeine is included in many soft drinks, as well as a larger amount in energy drinks. It is the world's most widely used psychoactive drug and by far the most common stimulant. In North America, 90% of adults consume caffeine daily.

A few jurisdictions restrict the sale and use of caffeine. In the United States, the Food and Drug Administration has banned the sale of pure and highly concentrated caffeine products for personal consumption, due to the risk of overdose and death. The Australian Government has announced a ban on the sale of pure and highly concentrated caffeine food products for personal consumption, following the death of a young man from acute caffeine toxicity. In Canada, Health Canada has proposed to limit the amount of caffeine in energy drinks to 180 mg per serving, and to require warning labels and other safety measures on these products.

Caffeine is also included in some medications, usually for the purpose of enhancing the effect of the primary ingredient, or reducing one of its side effects (especially drowsiness). Tablets containing standardized doses of caffeine are also widely available.

Caffeine's mechanism of action differs from many stimulants, as it produces stimulant effects by inhibiting adenosine receptors. Adenosine receptors are thought to be a large driver of drowsiness and sleep, and their action increases with extended wakefulness. Caffeine has been found to increase striatal dopamine in animal models, as well as inhibit the inhibitory effect of adenosine receptors on dopamine receptors, however the implications for humans are unknown. Unlike most stimulants, caffeine has no addictive potential. Caffeine does not appear to be a reinforcing stimulus, and some degree of aversion may actually occur, per a study on drug abuse liability published in a NIDA research monograph that described a group preferring placebo over caffeine. In large telephone surveys only 11% reported dependence symptoms. However, when people were tested in labs, only half of those who claim dependence actually experienced it, casting doubt on caffeine's ability to produce dependence and putting societal pressures in the spotlight.

Coffee consumption is associated with a lower overall risk of cancer. This is primarily due to a decrease in the risks of hepatocellular and endometrial cancer, but it may also have a modest effect on colorectal cancer. There does not appear to be a significant protective effect against other types of cancers, and heavy coffee consumption may increase the risk of bladder cancer. A protective effect of caffeine against Alzheimer's disease is possible, but the evidence is inconclusive. Moderate coffee consumption may decrease the risk of cardiovascular disease, and it may somewhat reduce the risk of type 2 diabetes. Drinking 1–3 cups of coffee per day does not affect the risk of hypertension compared to drinking little or no coffee. However those who drink 2–4 cups per day may be at a slightly increased risk. Caffeine increases intraocular pressure in those with glaucoma but does not appear to affect normal individuals. It may protect people from liver cirrhosis. There is no evidence that coffee stunts a child's growth. Caffeine may increase the effectiveness of some medications including ones used to treat headaches. Caffeine may lessen the severity of acute mountain sickness if taken a few hours prior to attaining a high altitude.

=== Ephedrine ===
Ephedrine is a sympathomimetic amine similar in molecular structure to the well-known drugs phenylpropanolamine and methamphetamine, as well as to the important neurotransmitter epinephrine (adrenaline). Ephedrine is commonly used as a stimulant, appetite suppressant, concentration aid, and decongestant, and to treat hypotension associated with anesthesia.

In chemical terms, it is an alkaloid with a phenethylamine skeleton found in various plants in the genus Ephedra (family Ephedraceae). Ephedrine works mainly by increasing the activity of norepinephrine (noradrenaline) on adrenergic receptors. It is most usually marketed as the hydrochloride or sulfate salt.

The herb má huáng (Ephedra sinica), used in traditional Chinese medicine (TCM), contains ephedrine and pseudoephedrine as its principal active constituents. The same may be true of other herbal products containing extracts from other Ephedra species.

=== MDMA ===
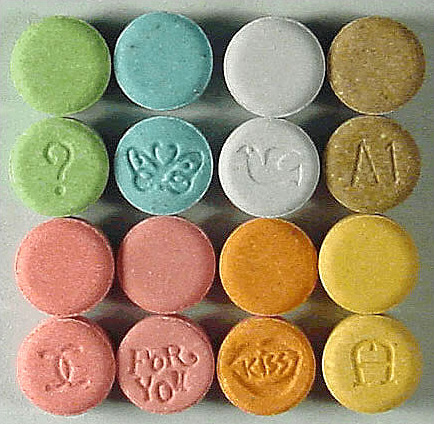
Tablets containing MDMA

3,4-Methylenedioxymethamphetamine (MDMA, ecstasy, or molly) is an entactogen, euphoriant, and psychostimulant of the amphetamine class. Briefly used by some psychotherapists as an adjunct to therapy, the drug became popular recreationally and, in the United States, the DEA listed MDMA as a Schedule I controlled substance, prohibiting most medical studies and applications. MDMA is known for its entactogenic properties. The stimulant effects of MDMA include hypertension, anorexia (appetite loss), euphoria, social disinhibition, insomnia (enhanced wakefulness/inability to sleep), improved energy, increased arousal, and increased perspiration, among others. Relative to catecholaminergic transmission, MDMA enhances serotonergic transmission significantly more, when compared to similar psychostimulants like amphetamine.

Due to the relative safety of MDMA, some researchers such as David Nutt have criticized the scheduling level, writing a satirical article finding MDMA to be 28 times less dangerous than horseriding, a condition he termed "equasy" or "Equine Addiction Syndrome".

=== MDPV ===
Methylenedioxypyrovalerone (MDPV) is a psychoactive drug with stimulant properties that acts as a norepinephrine–dopamine reuptake inhibitor (NDRI). It was first developed in the 1960s by a team at Boehringer Ingelheim. MDPV remained an obscure stimulant until around 2004, when it was reported to be sold as a designer drug. Products labeled as bath salts containing MDPV were previously sold as recreational drugs in gas stations and convenience stores in the United States, similar to the marketing for spice and K2 as incense.

Incidents of psychological and physical harm have been attributed to MDPV use.

=== Mephedrone ===
Mephedrone is a synthetic stimulant drug of the amphetamine and cathinone classes. Slang names include drone and MCAT. It is reported to be manufactured in China and is chemically similar to the cathinone compounds found in the khat plant of eastern Africa. Mephedrone comes in the form of tablets or a powder, which users can swallow, snort, or inject, producing similar effects to MDMA, amphetamines, and cocaine.

Mephedrone was first synthesized in 1929, but did not become widely known until it was rediscovered in 2003. By 2007, mephedrone was reported to be available for sale on the Internet; by 2008 law enforcement agencies had become aware of the compound; and, by 2010, it had been reported in most of Europe, becoming particularly prevalent in the United Kingdom. Mephedrone was first made illegal in Israel in 2008, followed by Sweden later that year. In 2010, it was made illegal in many European countries, and, in December 2010, the EU ruled it illegal. Australia, New Zealand, and the US treat it as an analog of other illegal drugs, so it can be controlled by laws similar to the Federal Analog Act. In September 2011, the US temporarily classified mephedrone as illegal, in effect from October 2011.

Mephedrone is neurotoxic and has abuse potential, predominantly exerted on serotonin terminals, mimicking that of MDMA with which it shares the same subjective sensations on abusers.

=== Methamphetamine ===
Methamphetamine (contracted from N-methyl-alpha-methylphenethylamine) is a potent stimulant of the phenethylamine and amphetamine classes that is used to treat attention deficit hyperactivity disorder (ADHD) and obesity. Methamphetamine exists as two enantiomers, dextrorotary and levorotary. Dextromethamphetamine is a stronger CNS stimulant than levomethamphetamine; however, both are addictive and produce the same toxicity symptoms at high doses. Although rarely prescribed due to the potential risks, methamphetamine hydrochloride is approved by the US Food and Drug Administration (FDA) under the trade name Desoxyn. Recreationally, methamphetamine is used to increase sexual desire, lift the mood, and increase energy, allowing some users to engage in sexual activity continuously for several days straight.

Methamphetamine may be sold illicitly, either as pure dextromethamphetamine or in an equal parts mixture of the right- and left-handed molecules (i.e., 50% levomethamphetamine and 50% dextromethamphetamine). Both dextromethamphetamine and racemic methamphetamine are Schedule II controlled substances in the United States. Also, the production, distribution, sale, and possession of methamphetamine is restricted or illegal in many other countries due to its placement in Schedule II of the United Nations Convention on Psychotropic Substances treaty. In contrast, levomethamphetamine is an over-the-counter drug in the United States. (Note: The active ingredient in some OTC inhalers in the United States is listed as levmetamfetamine, the INN and USAN of levomethamphetamine.)

In low doses, methamphetamine can cause an elevated mood and increase alertness, concentration, and energy in fatigued individuals. At higher doses, it can induce psychosis, rhabdomyolysis, and cerebral hemorrhage. Methamphetamine is known to have a high potential for abuse and addiction. Recreational use of methamphetamine may result in psychosis or lead to post-acute-withdrawal syndrome, a withdrawal syndrome that can persist for months beyond the typical withdrawal period. Unlike amphetamine and cocaine, methamphetamine is neurotoxic to humans, damaging both dopamine and serotonin neurons in the central nervous system (CNS). Unlike the long-term use of amphetamine in prescription doses, which may improve certain brain regions in individuals with ADHD, there is evidence that methamphetamine causes brain damage from long-term use in humans; this damage includes adverse changes in brain structure and function, such as reductions in gray matter volume in several brain regions and adverse changes in markers of metabolic integrity.

=== Methylphenidate ===
Methylphenidate is a psychostimulant drug that is often used in the treatment of ADHD and narcolepsy and occasionally to treat obesity in combination with diet restraints and exercise. Its effects at therapeutic doses include increased focus, increased alertness, decreased appetite, decreased need for sleep and decreased impulsivity. Methylphenidate is not usually used recreationally, but when it is used, its effects are similar to those of amphetamines.

Methylphenidate acts as a norepinephrine–dopamine reuptake inhibitor (NDRI), by blocking the norepinephrine transporter (NET) and the dopamine transporter (DAT). Methylphenidate has a higher affinity for the dopamine transporter than for the norepinephrine transporter, and so its effects are mainly due to elevated dopamine levels caused by the inhibited reuptake of dopamine, however increased norepinephrine levels also contribute to various of the effects caused by the drug.

Methylphenidate is sold under a number of brand names including Ritalin. Other versions include the long lasting tablet Concerta and the long lasting transdermal patch Daytrana.

=== Cocaine ===
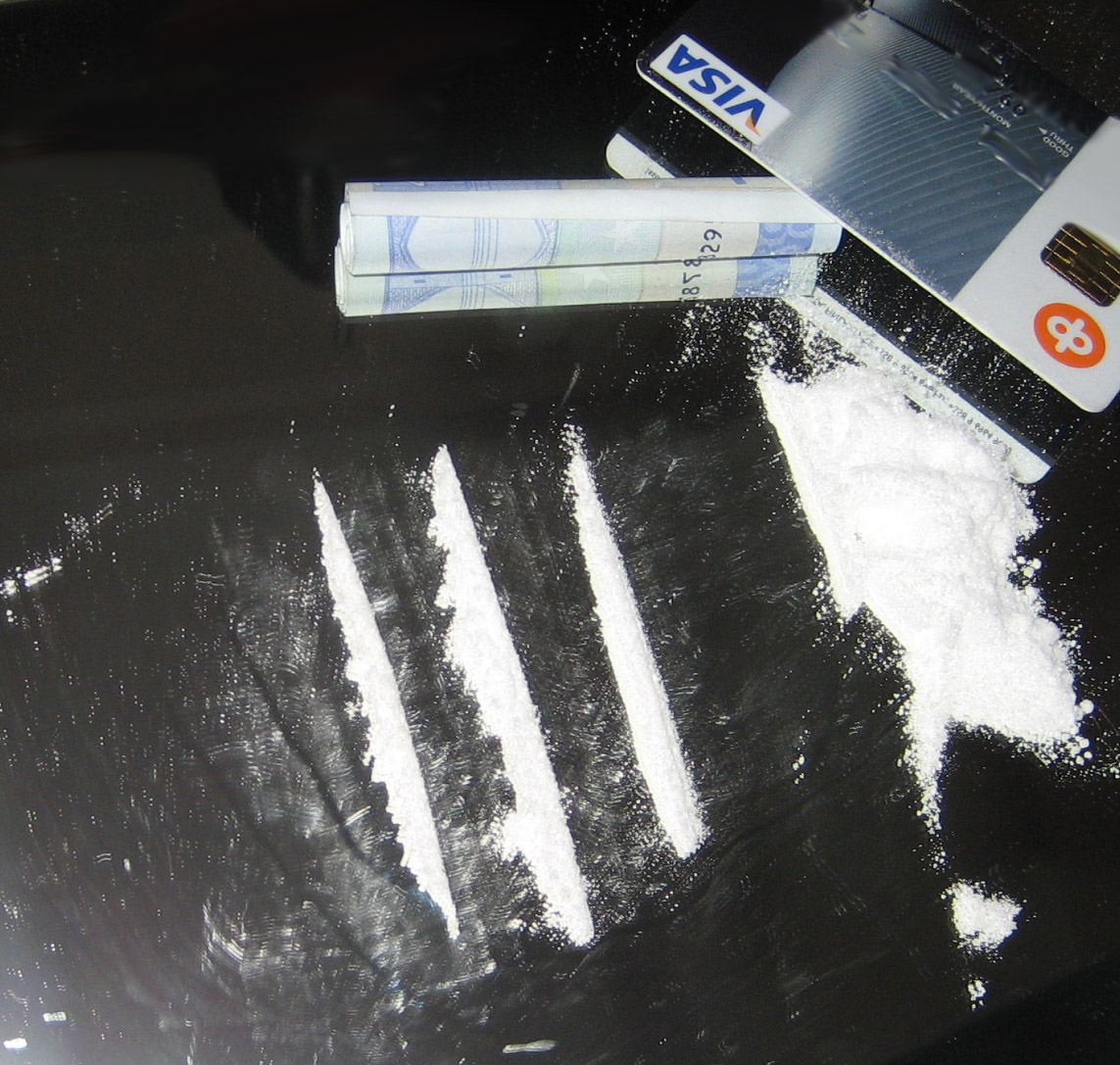
Lines of cocaine, a popular stimulant

Cocaine is an SNDRI. Cocaine is made from the leaves of the coca shrub, which grows in the mountain regions of South American countries such as Bolivia, Colombia, and Peru, regions in which it was cultivated and used for centuries mainly by the Aymara people. In Europe, North America, and some parts of Asia, the most common form of cocaine is a white crystalline powder. Cocaine is a stimulant but is not normally prescribed therapeutically for its stimulant properties, although it sees clinical use as a local anesthetic, in particular in ophthalmology. Most cocaine use is recreational and its abuse potential is high (higher than amphetamine), and so its sale and possession are strictly controlled in most jurisdictions. Other tropane derivative drugs related to cocaine are also known such as troparil and lometopane but have not been widely sold or used recreationally.

=== Nicotine ===
Nicotine is the active chemical constituent in tobacco, which is available in many forms, including cigarettes, cigars, chewing tobacco, and smoking cessation aids such as nicotine patches, nicotine gum, and electronic cigarettes. Nicotine is used widely throughout the world for its stimulating and relaxing effects. Nicotine exerts its effects through the agonism of nicotinic acetylcholine receptors, resulting in multiple downstream effects such as increase in activity of dopaminergic neurons in the midbrain reward system, and acetaldehyde one of the tobacco constituent decreased the expression of monoamine oxidase in the brain. Nicotine is addictive and dependence-forming. Tobacco, the most common source of nicotine, has an overall harm to user and self score 3% below cocaine, and 13% above amphetamines, ranking 6th most harmful of the 20 drugs assessed, as determined by a multi-criteria decision analysis.

=== Phenylpropanolamine ===
Phenylpropanolamine (PPA; Accutrim; β-hydroxyamphetamine), also known as the stereoisomers norephedrine and norpseudoephedrine, is a psychoactive drug of the phenethylamine and amphetamine chemical classes that is used as a stimulant, decongestant, and anorectic agent. It is commonly used in prescription and over-the-counter cough and cold preparations. In veterinary medicine, it is used to control urinary incontinence in dogs under trade names Propalin and Proin.

In the United States, PPA is no longer sold without a prescription due to a possible increased risk of stroke in younger women. In a few countries in Europe, however, it is still available either by prescription or sometimes over-the-counter. In Canada, it was withdrawn from the market on 31 May 2001. In India, human use of PPA and its formulations were banned on 10 February 2011.

=== Lisdexamfetamine ===
Lisdexamfetamine (Vyvanse, others) is an amphetamine-type medication, sold for use in treating ADHD. Its effects typically last around 14 hours. Lisdexamfetamine is inactive on its own and is metabolized into dextroamphetamine in the body. Consequently, it has a lower abuse potential (i.e., reduced effects from parenteral administration).

=== Pseudoephedrine ===
Pseudoephedrine is a sympathomimetic drug of the phenethylamine and amphetamine chemical classes. Pseudoephedrine may be used as a nasal/sinus decongestant, as a stimulant, or as a wakefulness-promoting agent.

The salts pseudoephedrine hydrochloride and pseudoephedrine sulfate are found in many over-the-counter preparations, either as a single ingredient or (more commonly) in combination with antihistamines, guaifenesin, dextromethorphan, or paracetamol (acetaminophen) or another NSAID (e.g., aspirin or ibuprofen). Pseudoephedrine is also used as a precursor chemical in the illegal production of methamphetamine.

=== Catha edulis (Khat) ===
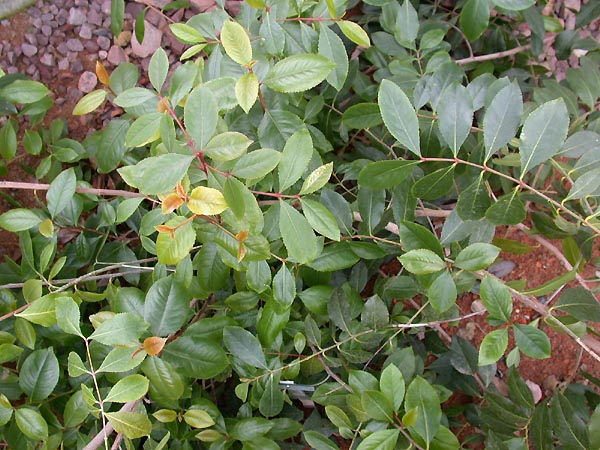
Catha edulis

Khat is a flowering plant native to the Horn of Africa and the Arabian Peninsula.

Khat contains a monoamine alkaloid called cathinone, a "keto-amphetamine". This alkaloid causes excitement, loss of appetite, and euphoria. In 1980, the World Health Organization (WHO) classified it as a drug of abuse that can produce mild to moderate psychological dependence (less than tobacco or alcohol), although the WHO does not consider khat to be seriously addictive. It is banned in some countries, such as the United States, Canada, and Germany, while its production, sale, and consumption are legal in other countries, including Djibouti, Ethiopia, Somalia, Kenya, and Yemen.

=== Modafinil ===
Modafinil is an eugeroic medication, which means that it promotes wakefulness and alertness. Modafinil is sold under the brand name Provigil among others. Modafinil is used to treat excessive daytime sleepiness due to narcolepsy, shift work sleep disorder, or obstructive sleep apnea. While it has seen off-label use as a purported cognitive enhancer, the research on its effectiveness for this use is not conclusive. Despite being a CNS stimulant, the addiction and dependence liabilities of modafinil are considered very low. Although modafinil shares biochemical mechanisms with stimulant drugs, it is less likely to have mood-elevating properties. The similarities in effects with caffeine are not clearly established. Unlike other stimulants, modafinil does not induce a subjective feeling of pleasure or reward, which is commonly associated with euphoria, an intense feeling of well-being. Euphoria is a potential indicator of drug abuse, which is the compulsive and excessive use of a substance despite adverse consequences. In clinical trials, modafinil has shown no evidence of abuse potential, that is why modafinil is considered to have a low risk of addiction and dependence, however, caution is advised.

=== Pitolisant ===
Pitolisant is an inverse agonist (antagonist) of the histamine H_{3} autoreceptor. As such, pitolisant is an antihistamine medication that also belongs to the class of CNS stimulants. Pitolisant is also considered a medication of eugeroic class, which means that it promotes wakefulness and alertness. Pitolisant is the first wakefulness-promoting agent that acts by blocking the H_{3} autoreceptor.

Pitolisant has been shown to be effective and well-tolerated for the treatment of narcolepsy with or without cataplexy.

Pitolisant is the only non-controlled anti-narcoleptic drug in the United States. It has shown minimal abuse risk in studies.

Blocking the histamine H_{3} autoreceptor increases the activity of histamine neurons in the brain. The H_{3} autoreceptors regulate histaminergic activity in the central nervous system (and to a lesser extent, the peripheral nervous system) by inhibiting histamine biosynthesis and release upon binding to endogenous histamine. By preventing the binding of endogenous histamine at the H_{3}, as well as producing a response opposite to that of endogenous histamine at the receptor (inverse agonism), pitolisant enhances histaminergic activity in the brain.

=== Serotonin 5-HT_{2A} receptor agonists ===
Certain serotonergic psychedelics and related non-hallucinogenic drugs, acting as serotonin 5-HT_{2A} receptor agonists, have been reported to have mild stimulant and/or "psychic energizing" (i.e., acute antidepressant) effects, both in animals and humans. These effects are often present at low or sub-hallucinogenic doses. Psychedelics are also known to promote wakefulness or cause insomnia.

Psychedelic and related drugs that have been reported to produce stimulant effects include the phenethylamines 2,5-DMA (DOH), DOM, DOET, DOPR, DON, MTFEM, Ariadne (4C-DOM; BL-3912; Dimoxamine), 2C-B, 2C-D, 2C-G-N, and ASR-2001 (2CB-5PrO), and the tryptamines 5-MeO-DiPT and 5-MeO-MiPT, among others. The lysergamide LSD has also been reported to have mild stimulant effects. Conversely, psilocybin does not seem to produce the same stimulant effects. The non-hallucinogenic Ariadne was under development as a potential pharmaceutical drug to take advantage of such effects in the treatment of conditions like depression in the 1970s, and reached phase 3 clinical trials for such indications, but was shelved reportedly for strategic economic reasons. ASR-2001, which is likewise non-hallucinogenic, is under development for use as a stimulant-like medication for treatment of psychiatric disorders.

Serotonin 5-HT_{2A} receptor agonists have been found to increase dopamine levels in brain areas like the frontal cortex, striatum, and nucleus accumbens in animal studies. Relatedly, serotonin 5-HT_{2A} receptor agonists are known to produce stimulant-like effects in animals such as hyperlocomotion (increased locomotor activity) and pro-motivational effects. The serotonin 5-HT_{2C} receptor, which most psychedelics additionally activate to varying degrees, is known to have opposing effects on dopamine release and stimulant-related behavior, which may contribute to inverted U-shaped dose–response relationships as well as divergent stimulant-like effects between different psychedelics.

== Recreational use and abuse ==
Stimulants enhance the activity of the central and peripheral nervous systems. Common effects may include increased alertness, awareness, wakefulness, endurance, productivity and motivation, arousal, locomotion, heart rate and blood pressure, and a diminished desire for food and sleep. Use of stimulants may cause the body to reduce significantly its production of natural body chemicals that fulfill similar functions. Until the body reestablishes its normal state, once the effect of the ingested stimulant has worn off the user may feel depressed, lethargic, confused, and miserable. This state is referred to as a "crash", and may provoke reuse of the stimulant.

Abuse of central nervous system (CNS) stimulants is common. Addiction to some CNS stimulants can quickly lead to medical, psychiatric, and psychosocial deterioration. Drug tolerance, dependence, and sensitization as well as a withdrawal syndrome can occur. Stimulants may be screened for in animal discrimination and self-administration models which have high sensitivity albeit low specificity. Research on a progressive ratio self-administration protocol has found amphetamine, methylphenidate, modafinil, cocaine, and nicotine to all have a higher break point than placebo that scales with dose indicating reinforcing effects. A progressive ratio self-administration protocol is a way of testing how much an animal or a human wants a drug by making them do a certain action (like pressing a lever or poking a nose device) to get the drug. The number of actions needed to get the drug increases every time, so it becomes harder and harder to get the drug. The highest number of actions that the animal or human is willing to do to get the drug is called the break point. The higher the break point, the more the animal or human wants the drug. In contrast to the classical stimulants such as amphetamine, the effects of modafinil depend on what the animals or humans have to do after getting the drug. If they have to do a performance task, like solving a puzzle or remembering something, modafinil makes them work harder for it than placebo, and the subjects wanted to self-administer modafinil. But if they had to do a relaxation task, like listening to music or watching a video, the subjects did not want to self-administer modafinil. This suggests that modafinil is more rewarding when it helps the animals or humans do something better or faster, especially considering that modafinil is not commonly abused or depended on by people, unlike other stimulants.

Dependence potentials of common stimulants
Drug	Mean	Pleasure	Psychological dependence	Physical dependence
Cocaine	2.39	3.0	2.8	1.3
Tobacco	2.21	2.3	2.6	1.8
Amphetamine	1.67	2.0	1.9	1.1
MDMA	1.13	1.5	1.2	0.7

== Treatment for misuse ==
Psychosocial treatments, such as contingency management, have demonstrated improved effectiveness when added to treatment as usual consisting of counseling or case-management. This benefit is demonstrated by a decrease in dropout rates and a lengthening of periods of abstinence.

== Testing ==
The presence of stimulants in the body may be tested by a variety of procedures. Serum and urine are the common sources of testing material although saliva is sometimes used. Commonly used tests include chromatography, immunologic assay, and mass spectrometry.

== See also ==
- Antidepressants
- Depressants
- Hallucinogens
- Nootropics
- Psychoanaleptics
