= Stimulant use disorder =

Harmful use of cocaine and amphetamine-type drugs

- Specialty: Psychiatry, clinical psychology

Stimulant use disorder is a type of substance use disorder where the use of stimulants caused clinically significant impairment or distress. It is defined in the DSM-5 as "the continued use of amphetamine-type substances, cocaine, or other stimulants leading to clinically significant impairment or distress, from mild to severe". These psychoactive drugs, known as stimulants, are among the most widely used drugs in the world today.

== Definition ==
A psychoactive drug, such as a stimulant, is a substance that affects one's behavior, mind, and body. Stimulant are psychoactive drugs that cause arousal. Routes of administration for stimulants include inhalation, insufflation, oral, and intravenous. Stimulants may be subject to regulation depending on jurisdiction. Some stimulants are used to treat attention deficit hyperactivity disorder, obesity, narcolepsy, and depression, as well as other conditions. Designer drugs are becoming increasingly popular as manufacture attempt to alter the chemical properties of drugs, and avoid jail time, legal penalties, and detection in drug screening efforts.

If a substance is used over a long period of time and the user becomes dependent upon it, a substance use disorder may develop. Substance use may lead to substance dependence and with time, addiction. Both mental and physiological dependence requires the development of tolerance leading to withdrawal symptoms. Stimulants come in a very large variety of subtypes and among the most common are caffeine, nicotine, cocaine, methamphetamine, amphetamines, amphetamine congeners, electronic cigarettes, and diet pills. Caffeine and nicotine are the most popular stimulants used today, with roughly 400 million cups of coffee consumed daily and 36.5 million current cigarette smokers, according to a 2015 study conducted by the Centers for Disease Control and Prevention. Nicotine, however, is treated separately psychiatrically under tobacco use disorder. Conversely, caffeine misuse does not qualify as an addictive disorder; thus it can not be diagnosed as a stimulant use disorder or any other substance use disorder. Certain isolated conditions related to caffeine are recognized in the DSM-5’s "substance-related" section, however: caffeine intoxication, caffeine withdrawal and other caffeine-induced disorders (e.g., Anxiety and Sleep Disorders).

== Signs and symptoms ==
=== Short-term effects ===
Even in low doses, stimulants cause a decrease in appetite, an increase in physical activity and alertness, convulsions, an elevated body temperature, increased respiration, irregular heartbeat, and increased blood pressure.

=== Long-term effects ===
The long-term use of stimulants can ultimately cause very serious medical issues, including addiction. Stimulant addiction, similar to other kinds of addiction, involves neurobiological changes that cause sensitization of the reward system to the stimulus in question (stimulants, in this case). People who use stimulants for a prolonged period frequently experience physiological changes that can be detrimental to their quality of life and require long-term treatment.

=== Symptoms of the disorder ===
The symptoms of stimulant use disorder include failure to control usage and frequency of use, an intense craving for the drug, increased use over time to obtain the same effects, known as a developed tolerance, and continued use despite negative repercussions and interference in one's everyday life and functioning. Furthermore, a disorder is noted when withdrawal symptoms occur because of a decrease in the drug amount and frequency, as well as stopping the use of the drug entirely. These withdrawal symptoms can last for days, weeks, months, and on rare occasions, years, depending on the frequency and dosages used by the individual. These symptoms include, but are not limited to, increased appetite, decreased energy, depression, loss of motivation and interest in once pleasurable activities, anxiety, insomnia, agitation, and an intense craving for the drug. Unless intensive medical and psychological treatment is sought after, there is a very high likelihood of relapse among the user.

== Epidemiology ==
The use of stimulants in humans causes rapid weight loss, cardiovascular effects such as an increase in heart rate, respiration, and blood pressure, emotional or mental side effects such as paranoia, anxiety, and aggression, as well as a change in the survival pathway known as the reward/reinforcement pathway in our brain. An increase in energy, a reduced appetite, increased alertness and a boost in confidence are all additional side effects of stimulant use when introduced to the body.

=== Medical ===
Stimulants are used medically to treat certain types of asthma, the common cold, depression, obesity, and a wide variety of physical pain and ailments. Most commonly, stimulants such as Adderall, Ritalin, and Vyvanse (lisdexamfetamine) are prescribed for both children and adults diagnosed with attention deficit hyperactivity disorder (ADHD).

=== Recreational ===
Recreational users take stimulants to change their state of mind, and report feeling a "rush" as the central nervous system is flooded with dopamine, epinephrine, and norepinephrine. This rush is caused by the sudden change in the brain's electrical and chemical activity. The stimulant manipulates the natural energy chemicals which are forced out and released into the body when they are not needed. Recreational users smoke, inject, snort, or ingest stimulants, all of which create different effects on the body.

== History ==
Certain types of stimulants are found in plants and grow naturally. The tobacco plant, the cocoa shrub, yohimbe, the betel nut, and the ephedra bush are just a few of the naturally occurring stimulants. Other forms of stimulants are man-made, with no naturally occurring plant base, and are instead created using synthetic chemicals. Often, this involves using prescription or over-the-counter pharmaceutical products as precursor materials.

Stimulants were first introduced to the medical community with the isolation of cocaine from the coca leaf in 1855, which is not only a stimulant but also a topical anesthetic.

In 1879, Vassili von Anrep of the University of Würzburg conducted an experiment in which he applied cocaine to one side of a frog's limbs before attempting an invasive medical procedure. Cocaine proved to be extremely effective as both an anesthetic and pain reducer.

In World War II, soldiers were medicated using a type of stimulant called amphetamines to keep both pilots and soldiers alert, full of energy, and ready to fight. Amphetamines were given in pill form to American soldiers, as well as to Japanese and German military members. It is estimated that German soldiers ingested roughly 35 million doses of Pervitin through the course of the war. Pervitin is a brand-name for methamphetamine, a drug that belongs to the stimulant class of drugs. The use of methamphetamine was an attempt by the Nazi leadership to create "super soldiers" who felt no pain and operated with extreme energy and unwavering confidence. The United States, for comparison, had dispensed roughly 200 million Benzedrine tablets. A mixture of amphetamine salts, these pills were favored for their ability to increase wakefulness and energy levels while simultaneously suppressing appetite.

The United States, around the year 1960, saw large increases in amphetamines sold as diet pills, with pharmaceutical companies recognizing the appetite-suppressing and energy-boosting effects stimulants could provide. It was estimated that worldwide sales of diet pills containing stimulants rocketed to over 10 billion tablets sold and that between 6% and 8% of the U.S. population were prescribed these types of medications to aid in weight loss. Within a decade, the Comprehensive Drug Abuse Prevention and Control Act of 1970 was passed, the purpose of which was to make it more difficult for individuals to obtain these drugs, with or without a prescription. The rationale for the act was the dangerous and life-threatening side effects of such drugs, which became better understood during the 1960s.

In 1993, approximately 200 million Americans had used some type of stimulant in the past year alone.

== See also ==
- Broader Terms
  - Substance use disorder
- Narrower Terms (By type of substance)
  - Nicotine dependence
  - Amphetamine dependence
  - Cocaine dependence
- Narrower Terms (By type of disorder)
  - Stimulant psychosis
