= Dopamine transporter =

Protein found in humans

SLC6A3
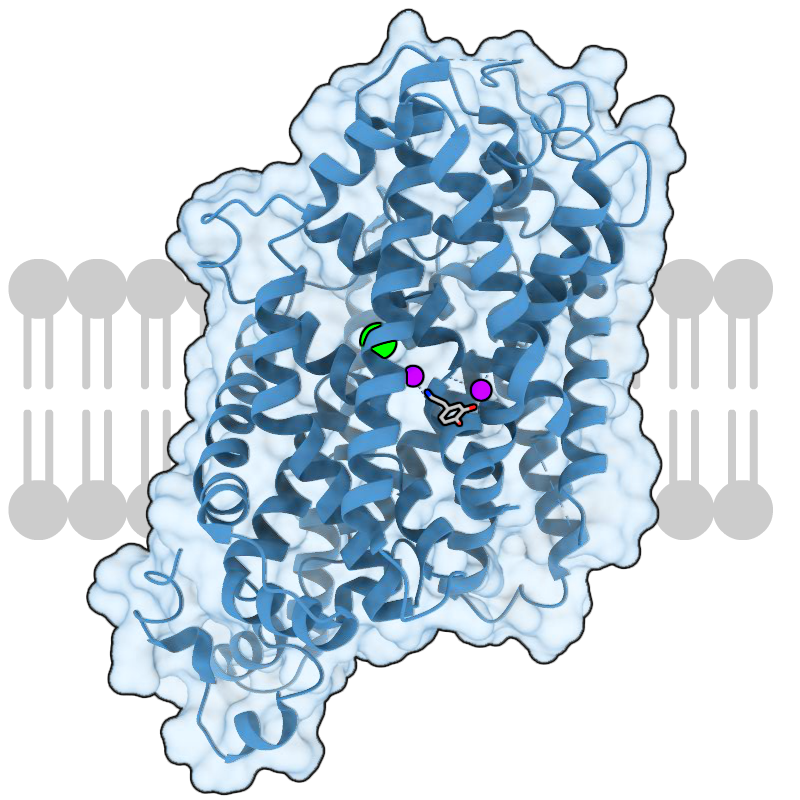

Identifiers
- Aliases: SLC6A3, solute carrier family 6 (neurotransmitter transporter), member 3, DAT, DAT1, PKDYS, solute carrier family 6 member 3, Dopamine transporter, PKDYS1
- External IDs: OMIM: 126455; MGI: 94862; GeneCards: SLC6A3

Gene location (Human)
Chr.	Chromosome 5 (human)
Band	5p15.33	Start	1,392,794 bp
Band	5p15.33	End	1,445,440 bp

Gene location (Mouse)
Chr.	Chromosome 13 (mouse)
Band	13 C1|13 40.1 cM	Start	73,684,866 bp
Band	13 C1|13 40.1 cM	End	73,726,791 bp
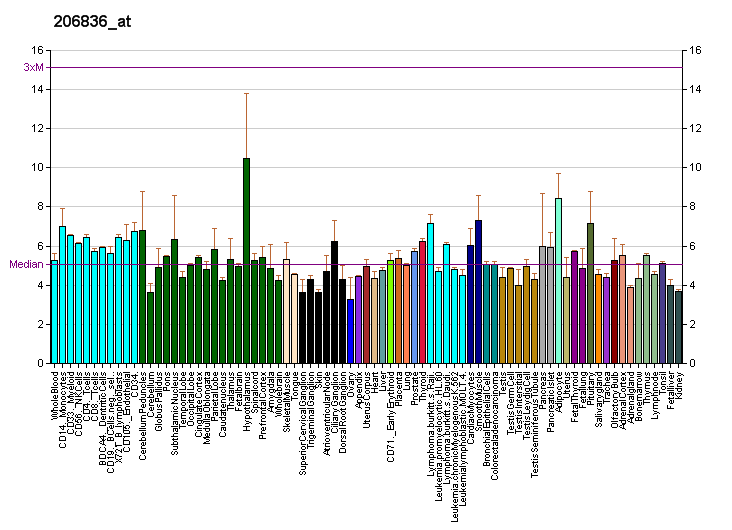
RNA expression pattern
Bgee	Human / Mouse (ortholog); Top expressed in: substantia nigra; testicle; gonad; left lobe of thyroid gland; right ovary; canal of the cervix; left ovary; right lobe of thyroid gland; body of uterus; renal cortex / Top expressed in: substantia nigra; ventral tegmental area; embryo; hypothalamus; arcuate nucleus; epithelium of small intestine; epithelium of lens; central gray substance of midbrain; suprachiasmatic nucleus; olfactory bulb; More reference expression data
BioGPS	More reference expression data
Gene ontology
Molecular function	protein N-terminus binding; dopamine:sodium symporter activity; metal ion binding; neurotransmitter:sodium symporter activity; dopamine binding; protein binding; symporter activity; monoamine transmembrane transporter activity; protein-containing complex binding; protease binding; signaling receptor binding; protein phosphatase 2A binding
Cellular component	cytoplasm; integral component of membrane; membrane; plasma membrane; integral component of plasma membrane; cell surface; axon; flotillin complex; soma; membrane raft; presynapse; neuron projection; dopaminergic synapse; integral component of postsynaptic membrane; integral component of presynaptic membrane
Biological process	response to cocaine; prepulse inhibition; response to organic cyclic compound; locomotory behavior; dopamine biosynthetic process; response to nicotine; ageing; neurotransmitter biosynthetic process; monoamine transport; adenohypophysis development; regulation of dopamine metabolic process; response to iron ion; sensory perception of smell; dopamine uptake involved in synaptic transmission; dopamine catabolic process; dopamine transport; positive regulation of multicellular organism growth; response to cAMP; lactation; response to ethanol; neurotransmitter transport; dopamine uptake; transmembrane transport; neurotransmitter uptake
Sources:Amigo / QuickGO
Orthologs
Databases	NCBI: entry; OMA: entry
Species	Human	Mouse
Entrez	6531	13162
Ensembl	ENSG00000142319; ENSG00000276996	ENSMUSG00000021609
UniProt	Q01959	Q61327
RefSeq (mRNA)	NM_001044	NM_010020
RefSeq (protein)	NP_001035	NP_034150
Location (UCSC)	Chr 5: 1.39 – 1.45 Mb	Chr 13: 73.68 – 73.73 Mb
PubMed search
- Wikidata
View/Edit Human	View/Edit Mouse

The dopamine transporter (DAT, also sodium-dependent dopamine transporter) is a membrane-spanning protein coded for in humans by the SLC6A3 gene (also known as DAT1), that pumps the neurotransmitter dopamine out of the synaptic cleft back into cytosol. In the cytosol, other transporters sequester the dopamine into vesicles for storage and later release. Dopamine reuptake via DAT provides the primary mechanism through which dopamine is cleared from synapses, although there may be an exception in the prefrontal cortex, where evidence points to a possibly larger role of the norepinephrine transporter.

DAT is implicated in a number of dopamine-related disorders, including attention deficit hyperactivity disorder, bipolar disorder, clinical depression, eating disorders, and substance use disorders. The gene that encodes the DAT protein is located on chromosome 5, consists of 15 coding exons, and is roughly 64 kbp long. Evidence for the associations between DAT and dopamine related disorders has come from a type of genetic polymorphism, known as a variable number tandem repeat, in the SLC6A3 gene, which influences the amount of protein expressed.

== Function ==
DAT is an integral membrane protein that removes dopamine from the synaptic cleft and deposits it into surrounding cells, thus terminating the signal of the neurotransmitter. Dopamine underlies several aspects of cognition, including reward, and DAT facilitates regulation of that signal.

== Mechanism ==
DAT is a symporter that moves dopamine across the cell membrane by coupling the movement to the energetically favorable movement of sodium ions moving from high to low concentration into the cell. DAT function requires the sequential binding and co-transport of two Na^{+} ions and one Cl^{−} ion with the dopamine substrate. The driving force for DAT-mediated dopamine reuptake is the ion concentration gradient generated by the plasma membrane Na^{+}/K^{+} ATPase.

In the most widely accepted model for monoamine transporter function, sodium ions must bind to the extracellular domain of the transporter before dopamine can bind. Once dopamine binds, the protein undergoes a conformational change, which allows both sodium and dopamine to unbind on the intracellular side of the membrane.

Studies using electrophysiology and radioactive-labeled dopamine have confirmed that the dopamine transporter is similar to other monoamine transporters in that one molecule of neurotransmitter can be transported across the membrane with one or two sodium ions. Chloride ions are also needed to prevent a buildup of positive charge. These studies have also shown that transport rate and direction is totally dependent on the sodium gradient.

Because of the tight coupling of the membrane potential and the sodium gradient, activity-induced changes in membrane polarity can dramatically influence transport rates. In addition, the transporter may contribute to dopamine release when the neuron depolarizes.

=== DAT–Ca_{v} coupling ===
Preliminary evidence suggests that the dopamine transporter couples to L-type voltage-gated calcium channels (particularly Ca_{v}1.2 and Ca_{v}1.3), which are expressed in virtually all dopamine neurons. As a result of DAT–Ca_{v} coupling, DAT substrates that produce depolarizing currents through the transporter are able to open calcium channels that are coupled to the transporter, resulting in a calcium influx in dopamine neurons. This calcium influx is believed to induce CAMKII-mediated phosphorylation of the dopamine transporter as a downstream effect; since DAT phosphorylation by CAMKII results in dopamine efflux in vivo, activation of transporter-coupled calcium channels is a potential mechanism by which certain drugs (e.g., amphetamine) trigger neurotransmitter release.

== Protein structure ==
The initial determination of the membrane topology of DAT was based upon hydrophobic sequence analysis and sequence similarities with the GABA transporter. These methods predicted twelve transmembrane domains (TMD) with a large extracellular loop between the third and fourth TMDs. Further characterization of this protein used proteases, which digest proteins into smaller fragments, and glycosylation, which occurs only on extracellular loops, and largely verified the initial predictions of membrane topology. The exact structure of the Drosophila melanogaster dopamine transporter (dDAT) was elucidated in 2013 by X-ray crystallography.

== Location and distribution ==
Pharmacodynamics of amphetamine in a dopamine neuron
Amphetamine enters the presynaptic neuron across the neuronal membrane or through DAT. Once inside, it binds to TAAR1 or enters synaptic vesicles through VMAT2. When amphetamine enters synaptic vesicles through VMAT2, it collapses the vesicular pH gradient, which in turn causes dopamine to be released into the cytosol (light tan-colored area) through VMAT2. When amphetamine binds to TAAR1, it reduces the firing rate of the dopamine neuron via G protein-coupled inwardly rectifying potassium channels (GIRKs) and activates protein kinase A (PKA) and protein kinase C (PKC), which subsequently phosphorylate DAT. PKA phosphorylation causes DAT to withdraw into the presynaptic neuron (internalize) and cease transport. PKC-phosphorylated DAT may either operate in reverse or, like PKA-phosphorylated DAT, internalize and cease transport. Amphetamine is also known to increase intracellular calcium, an effect which is associated with DAT phosphorylation through a CAMKIIα-dependent pathway, in turn producing dopamine efflux.

Regional distribution of DAT has been found in areas of the brain with established dopaminergic circuitry, including the nigrostriatal, mesolimbic, and mesocortical pathways. The nuclei that make up these pathways have distinct patterns of expression. Gene expression patterns in the adult mouse show high expression in the substantia nigra pars compacta.

DAT in the mesocortical pathway, labeled with radioactive antibodies, was found to be enriched in dendrites and cell bodies of neurons in the substantia nigra pars compacta and ventral tegmental area. This pattern makes sense for a protein that regulates dopamine levels in the synapse.

Staining in the striatum and nucleus accumbens of the mesolimbic pathway was dense and heterogeneous. In the striatum, DAT is localized in the plasma membrane of axon terminals. Double immunocytochemistry demonstrated DAT colocalization with two other markers of nigrostriatal terminals, tyrosine hydroxylase and D2 dopamine receptors. The latter was thus demonstrated to be an autoreceptor on cells that release dopamine. TAAR1 is a presynaptic intracellular receptor that is also colocalized with DAT and which has the opposite effect of the D2 autoreceptor when activated; i.e., it internalizes dopamine transporters and induces efflux through reversed transporter function via PKA and PKC signaling.

Surprisingly, DAT was not identified within any synaptic active zones. These results suggest that striatal dopamine reuptake may occur outside of synaptic specializations once dopamine diffuses from the synaptic cleft.

In the substantia nigra, DAT is localized to axonal and dendritic (i.e., pre- and post-synaptic) plasma membranes.

Within the perikarya of pars compacta neurons, DAT was localized primarily to rough and smooth endoplasmic reticulum, Golgi complex, and multivesicular bodies, identifying probable sites of synthesis, modification, transport, and degradation.

== Genetics and regulation ==
The gene for DAT, known as DAT1, is located on chromosome 5p15. The protein encoding region of the gene is over 64 kb long and comprises 15 coding segments or exons. This gene has a variable number tandem repeat (VNTR) at the 3' end (rs28363170) and another in the intron 8 region. Differences in the VNTR have been shown to affect the basal level of expression of the transporter; consequently, researchers have looked for associations with dopamine-related disorders.

Nurr1, a nuclear receptor that regulates many dopamine-related genes, can bind the promoter region of this gene and induce expression. This promoter may also be the target of the transcription factor Sp-1.

While transcription factors control which cells express DAT, functional regulation of this protein is largely accomplished by kinases. MAPK, CAMKII, PKA, and PKC can modulate the rate at which the transporter moves dopamine or cause the internalization of DAT. Co-localized TAAR1 is an important regulator of the dopamine transporter that, when activated, phosphorylates DAT through protein kinase A (PKA) and protein kinase C (PKC) signaling. Phosphorylation by either protein kinase can result in DAT internalization (non-competitive reuptake inhibition), but PKC-mediated phosphorylation alone induces reverse transporter function (dopamine efflux). Dopamine autoreceptors also regulate DAT by directly opposing the effect of TAAR1 activation.

The human dopamine transporter (hDAT) contains a high affinity extracellular zinc binding site which, upon zinc binding, inhibits dopamine reuptake and amplifies amphetamine-induced dopamine efflux in vitro. In contrast, the human serotonin transporter (hSERT) and human norepinephrine transporter (hNET) do not contain zinc binding sites. Zinc supplementation may reduce the minimum effective dose of amphetamine when it is used for the treatment of attention deficit hyperactivity disorder.

== Biological role and disorders ==
The rate at which DAT removes dopamine from the synapse can have a profound effect on the amount of dopamine in the cell. This is best evidenced by the severe cognitive deficits, motor abnormalities, and hyperactivity of mice with no dopamine transporters. These characteristics have striking similarities to the symptoms of ADHD.

Differences in the functional VNTR have been identified as risk factors for bipolar disorder and ADHD. Data has emerged that suggests there is also an association with stronger withdrawal symptoms from alcoholism, although this is a point of controversy. An allele of the DAT gene with normal protein levels is associated with non-smoking behavior and ease of quitting. Additionally, male adolescents particularly those in high-risk families (ones marked by a disengaged mother and absence of maternal affection) who carry the 10-allele VNTR repeat show a statistically significant affinity for antisocial peers.

Increased activity of DAT is associated with several different disorders, including clinical depression.

Mutations in DAT have been shown to cause dopamine transporter deficiency syndrome, an autosomal recessive movement disorder characterized by progressively worsening dystonia and parkinsonism.

== Pharmacology ==
The dopamine transporter is the target of substrates, dopamine releasers, transport inhibitors and allosteric modulators.

Cocaine blocks DAT by binding directly to the transporter and reducing the rate of transport. In contrast, amphetamine enters the presynaptic neuron directly through the neuronal membrane or through DAT, competing for reuptake with dopamine. Once inside, it binds to TAAR1 or enters synaptic vesicles through VMAT2. When amphetamine binds to TAAR1, it reduces the firing rate of the postsynaptic neuron and triggers protein kinase A and protein kinase C signaling, resulting in DAT phosphorylation. Phosphorylated DAT then either operates in reverse or withdraws into the presynaptic neuron and ceases transport. When amphetamine enters the synaptic vesicles through VMAT2, dopamine is released into the cytosol. Amphetamine also produces dopamine efflux through a second TAAR1-independent mechanism involving CAMKIIα-mediated phosphorylation of the transporter, which putatively arises from the activation of DAT-coupled L-type calcium channels by amphetamine.

The dopaminergic mechanisms of each drug are believed to underlie the pleasurable feelings elicited by these substances.

== Interactions ==
Dopamine transporter has been shown to interact with:

- Alpha-synuclein,
- PICK1,
- Synaptogyrin-3, and
- TGFB1I1,

Apart from these innate protein-protein interactions, recent studies demonstrated that viral proteins such as HIV-1 Tat protein interacts with the DAT and this binding may alter the dopamine homeostasis in HIV positive individuals which is a contributing factor for the HIV-associated neurocognitive disorders.

== Ligands and modulators ==
=== Substrates ===
- Dopamine
- Norepinephrine
- Substrate-type dopamine releasing agents (e.g., amphetamine)
- Catecholaminergic activity enhancers (e.g., selegiline, PPAP, BPAP)
- Certain dopaminergic neurotoxins (e.g., MPTP, 6-OHDA)

=== Dopamine reuptake inhibitors (DRIs) ===
==== Typical or classical cocaine-like blockers ====
- Amfonelic acid
- Amineptine
- BTCP
- Cocaethylene
- Cocaine
- JJC8-088
- Methylenedioxypyrovalerone (MDPV)
- Methylphenidate
- Orphenadrine
- Pethidine (meperidine)
- Pipradrol
- RTI-55
- Troparil (WIN-35065)
- WIN-35428 (β-CFT)

These agents may actually act as dopamine releasing agent-esque DAT negative allosteric modulators or "inverse agonists".

==== Atypical non-psychostimulant blockers ====
- Armodafinil
- Benztropine
- Bupropion (but some potential for cocaine-like actions)
- GBR-12935
- JHW-007
- JJC8-091
- Mazindol
- (S)-MK-26
- Modafinil (but a few cases of misuse)
- Nomifensine (but some cases of misuse)
- Phenylpiracetam
- (R)-Phenylpiracetam (MRZ-9547)
- RDS03-94
- Rimcazole
- Sibutramine
- Solriamfetol
- Tamoxifen
- Tesofensine
- Vanoxerine (GBR-12909)

These agents may actually act as simple competitive DAT blockers without releaser-like "inverse agonist" activity.

==== Unsorted blockers ====
- Indatraline
- PRX-14040

=== Dopamine releasing agents (DRAs) ===
- 2-Aminoindane (2-AI)
- 5-Chloro-αMT
- α-Ethyltryptamine (αET)
- α-Methyltryptamine (αMT)
- Aminorex
- Amphetamine (both dextro- and levoamphetamine)
- Benzylpiperazine (BZP)
- Cathine
- Cathinone
- Ephedrine
- Lisdexamfetamine (LDX)
- Methylenedioxyamphetamine (MDA)
- Methylenedioxyethylamphetamine (MDEA)
- Methylenedioxymethamphetamine (MDMA)
- Mephedrone
- Methamphetamine
- Methylone
- Naphthylisopropylamine (PAL-287)
- Octopamine
- Pemoline
- Phenethylamine
- Phenmetrazine
- Phentermine
- Phenylpropanolamine (PPA)
- Pseudoephedrine
- Tryptamine
- Tyramine

These agents are also known as substrate-type dopamine releasing agents and as DAT reversers.

=== Allosteric modulators ===
==== Positive allosteric modulators ====
- Apigenin
- Luteolin
- SoRI-9804 (SRI-9804)
- SoRI-20040 (SRI-20040)

==== Negative allosteric modulators ====
- Armesocarb (MLR-1019)
- Ibogaine
- KM822
- Mesocarb (Sydnocarb; MLR-1017)
- MRS7292
- SoRI-20041 (SRI-20041)
- SRI-29574
- SRI-31142

== See also ==
- Monoamine transporter
- Norepinephrine transporter
- Serotonin transporter
- Glutamate transporter
