= C13H17N =

The molecular formula C_{13}H_{17}N (molar mass: 187.28 g/mol, exact mass: 187.1361 u) may refer to:

- C-DMT
- D-Deprenyl, also known as dextro-N-propargyl-N-methylamphetamine
- Octahydrobenzo(g)quinoline
- Pyr-AI
- Selegiline (L-deprenyl)
