= Desmethylselegiline =

Chemical compound

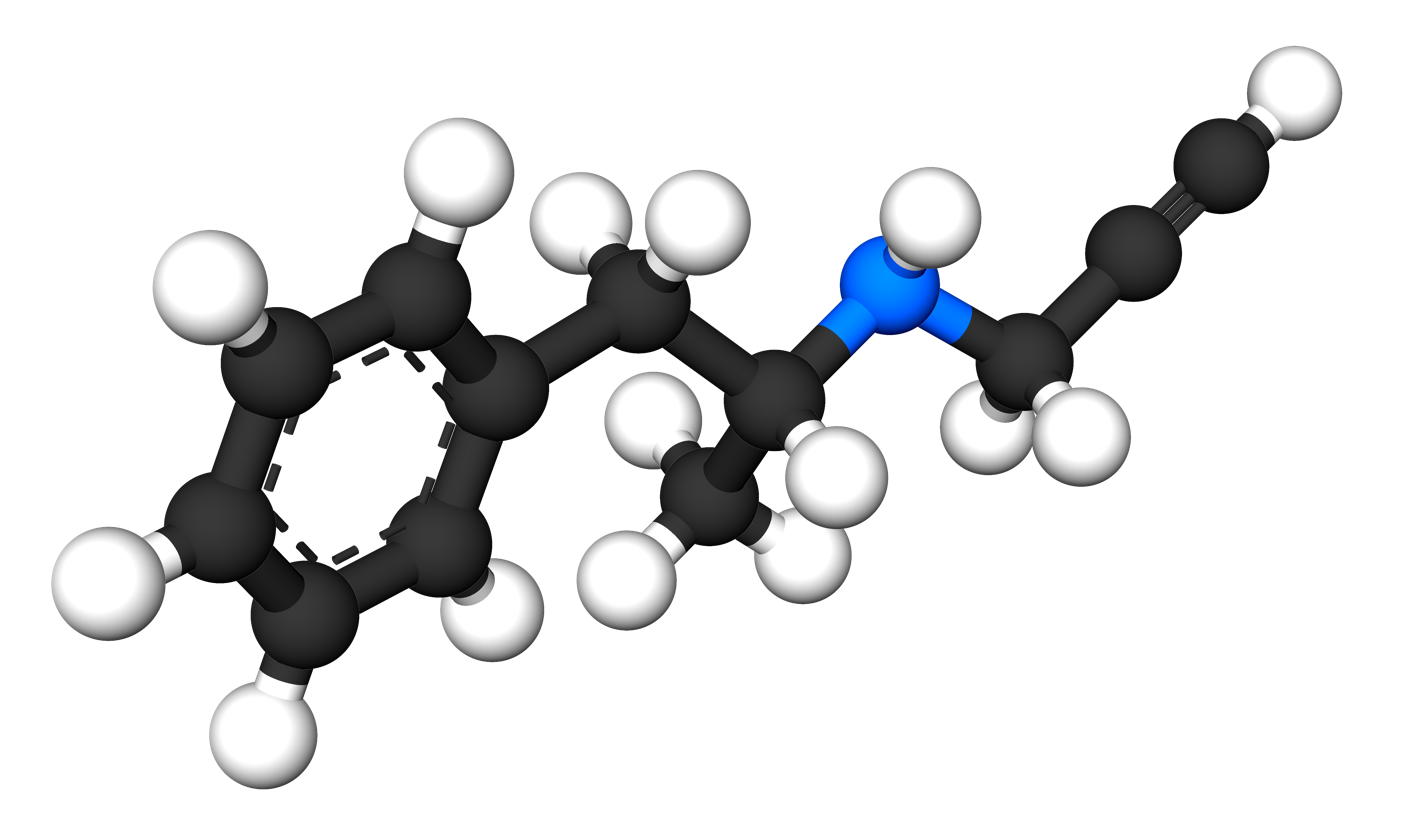

Clinical data
- Other names: DMS; N-Desmethylselegiline; Norselegiline; L-Desmethyldeprenyl; L-DD; R-(–)-N-Desmethyldeprenyl; L-Nordeprenyl; N-Propargyl-L-amphetamine
- Routes of administration: By mouth
- Drug class: Monoamine oxidase inhibitor; Catecholaminergic activity enhancer; Norepinephrine–dopamine releasing agent

Pharmacokinetic data
- Metabolites: • Levoamphetamine

Identifiers
- IUPAC name: 1-Phenyl-N-prop-2-ynylpropan-2-amine
- CAS Number: 18913-84-3 2588-96-7 (HCl)
- PubChem CID: 200718
- ChemSpider: 161558
- ChEMBL: ChEMBL1276
- CompTox Dashboard (EPA): DTXSID001315731

Chemical and physical data
- Formula: C_{12}H_{15}N
- Molar mass: 173.259 g·mol^{−1}
- 3D model (JSmol): Interactive image
- SMILES: CC(CC1=CC=CC=C1)NCC#C
- InChI: InChI=1S/C12H15N/c1-3-9-13-11(2)10-12-7-5-4-6-8-12/h1,4-8,11,13H,9-10H2,2H3; Key:UUFAJPMQSFXDFR-UHFFFAOYSA-N

Desmethylselegiline (DMS), also known as norselegiline or as N-propargyl-L-amphetamine, is an active metabolite of selegiline, a medication used in the treatment of Parkinson's disease and depression.

Like selegiline, DMS is a monoamine oxidase inhibitor (MAOI); specifically, it is a selective and irreversible inhibitor of monoamine oxidase B (MAO-B). In addition, it is a catecholaminergic activity enhancer (CAE) similarly to selegiline. The drug also produces levoamphetamine as an active metabolite, which is a norepinephrine–dopamine releasing agent with sympathomimetic and psychostimulant effects.

DMS has been studied much less extensively than selegiline and has not been developed or approved for medical use.

== Pharmacology ==
=== Pharmacodynamics ===
DMS is a monoamine oxidase inhibitor (MAOI), similarly to selegiline. It is specifically a selective and irreversible inhibitor of monoamine oxidase B (MAO-B). The compound is also a catecholaminergic activity enhancer (CAE) like selegiline. The potency of DMS as a CAE appears to be similar to that of selegiline.

Aside from being an active metabolite of selegiline, DMS itself has been studied clinically. A single 10 mg oral dose of DMS inhibited platelet MAO-B activity by 68 ± 16%, relative to 94 ± 9% with a single 10 mg dose of selegiline. Subsequently, platelet MAO-B activity returned to baseline after 2 weeks. Hence, although less potent than selegiline, DMS is also an effective MAO-B inhibitor.

DMS has been found to be 60-fold less potent than selegiline as an MAO-B inhibitor in vitro. However, it was only 3-fold less potent than selegiline orally in vivo in rats with repeated administration. In other research, DMS was 6-fold less potent than selegiline in inhibition of platelet MAO-B activity.

Selegiline produces levomethamphetamine and levoamphetamine as active metabolites, whereas DMS produces only levoamphetamine as a metabolite. Unlike DMS and selegiline, levoamphetamine and levomethamphetamine are not active as MAO-B inhibitors at concentrations up to 100 μM in vitro. However, levoamphetamine is a releaser of norepinephrine and dopamine and has sympathomimetic and psychostimulant effects. (Note: Smith & Davis (1977) reviewed 11 clinical studies of dextroamphetamine and levoamphetamine including doses and potency ratios in terms of a variety of psychological and behavioral effects. The summaries of these studies are in Table 1 of the paper.) Similarly to selegiline, but unlike levoamphetamine and levomethamphetamine, DMS itself is not a monoamine releasing agent.

DMS shows neuroprotective, antioxidant, and antiapoptotic activity similarly to selegiline. DMS is more potent in some of these effects than selegiline. The neuroprotective and antioxidant properties of DMS and selegiline appear to be independent of MAO-B inhibition. Both selegiline and DMS have been found to bind to and inhibit glyceraldehyde-3-phosphate dehydrogenase (GAPDH), which may be involved in their neuroprotective effects.

=== Pharmacokinetics ===
Selegiline and DMS were compared in a clinical study in which 10 mg of each drug was administered orally. DMS showed 27-fold higher peak levels and 33-fold higher area-under-the-curve levels than selegiline in this study, suggesting that it has much greater oral bioavailability than selegiline.

Levoamphetamine is an active metabolite of DMS. Conversely, in contrast to selegiline, which metabolizes into both levomethamphetamine and levoamphetamine, levomethamphetamine is not a metabolite of DMS.

Selegiline is metabolized into DMS in the liver. With use of oral selegiline in humans, 86% of a dose is excreted in urine, with 1.1% of this being DMS, 59.2% being levomethamphetamine, and 26.3% being levoamphetamine. Levoamphetamine is formed with selegiline from both DMS and levomethamphetamine. However, levoamphetamine is only a minor metabolite of levomethamphetamine (2–3%). As a metabolite of selegiline, DMS has an elimination half-life ranging from 2.6 to 11 hours. The half-lives of both selegiline and DMS increase with continuous use of selegiline.

== Chemistry ==
=== Prodrugs ===
Prodrugs of DMS have been synthesized and studied.
