= D-Deprenyl =

Chemical compound

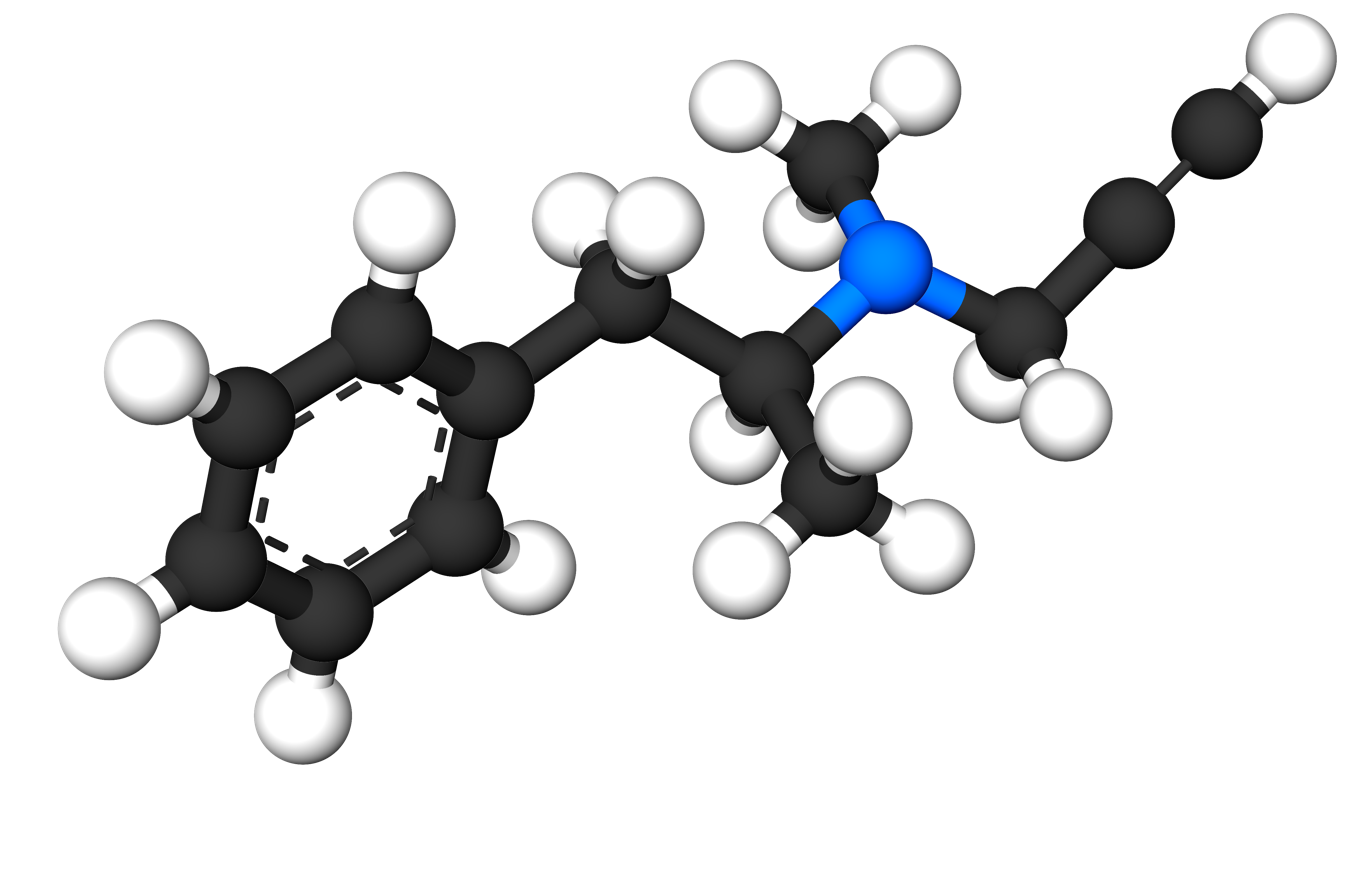

Clinical data
- Other names: dextro-N-propargyl-N-methylamphetamine

Identifiers
- IUPAC name: (2S)-N-methyl-1-phenyl-N-prop-2-ynyl-propan-2-amine
- CAS Number: 4528-51-2
- PubChem CID: 199605
- ChemSpider: 172774
- UNII: YK7HY2RY1W
- CompTox Dashboard (EPA): DTXSID901317215

Chemical and physical data
- Formula: C_{13}H_{17}N
- Molar mass: 187.286 g·mol^{−1}
- 3D model (JSmol): Interactive image
- Chirality: Dextrorotatory enantiomer
- SMILES: C#CCN([C@H](Cc1ccccc1)C)C
- InChI: InChI=1S/C13H17N/c1-4-10-14(3)12(2)11-13-8-6-5-7-9-13/h1,5-9,12H,10-11H2,2-3H3/t12-/m0/s1; Key:MEZLKOACVSPNER-LBPRGKRZSA-N

d-Deprenyl, also known as or dextro-N-propargyl-N-methylamphetamine, is an MAO-B inhibitor that metabolizes into d-amphetamine and d-methamphetamine and is therefore also a norepinephrine–dopamine releasing agent. It is one of the two enantiomers of deprenyl and is the opposite enantiomer of l-deprenyl (selegiline).

l-Deprenyl, also an MAO-B inhibitor, metabolizes to l-amphetamine and l-methamphetamine, which are both norepinephrine releasing agents. In contrast, d-deprenyl additionally has dopaminergic effects and has been found to be reinforcing in scientific research, whereas l-deprenyl is not known to have any appreciable psychological reinforcement.

In addition to its actions as an MAO-B inhibitor and NDRA, d-deprenyl has been found to bind with high affinity to sigma receptors (K_{i} = 79–1,800 nM) similarly to various other amphetamine derivatives. Its l-isomer, selegiline, binds with several-fold lower affinity in comparison.

== See also ==
- Clorgiline
- Tranylcypromine
