= C13H16FN =

The molecular formula C_{13}H_{16}FN (molar mass: 205.276 g/mol) may refer to:

- 4-Fluorodeprenyl
- 4-Fluoroselegiline
