= Deprenyl =

Pharmaceutical drug

Clinical data
- Other names: (+/-)-Deprenyl; (±)-Deprenyl; dl-Deprenyl; (±)-Selegiline; (rac)-Selegiline; E-250; N-Propargylmethamphetamine; N,α-Dimethyl-N-2-propynylphenethylamine; N-Propargyl-N-methylamphetamine; Phenylisopropylmethylpropinylamine
- Drug class: Catecholaminergic activity enhancer, monoamine oxidase inhibitor, norepinephrine-dopamine releasing agent

Identifiers
- IUPAC name: N-methyl-1-phenyl-N-prop-2-ynylpropan-2-amine
- CAS Number: 2323-36-6 14611-51-9
- PubChem CID: 5195
- ChemSpider: 5007
- UNII: DPF682Q08V
- ChEBI: CHEBI:50217
- ChEMBL: ChEMBL8663
- CompTox Dashboard (EPA): DTXSID60860142

Chemical and physical data
- Formula: C_{13}H_{17}N
- Molar mass: 187.286 g·mol^{−1}
- 3D model (JSmol): Interactive image
- SMILES: CC(CC1=CC=CC=C1)N(C)CC#C
- InChI: InChI=1S/C13H17N/c1-4-10-14(3)12(2)11-13-8-6-5-7-9-13/h1,5-9,12H,10-11H2,2-3H3; Key:MEZLKOACVSPNER-UHFFFAOYSA-N

Deprenyl, also known by its developmental code name E-250 and as N-propargylmethamphetamine, is the racemic mixture of D-deprenyl and L-deprenyl (selegiline). It was discovered in 1961 in Hungary at Chinoin Pharmaceutical Company by Zoltan Ecseri and József Knoll, was patented in 1962, and was first described in the literature in 1964 or 1965.

The drug is a monoamine oxidase inhibitor and norepinephrine–dopamine releasing agent. It is a prodrug of methamphetamine and amphetamine, which mediates the latter action. Deprenyl was studied clinically at high doses of 50 to 100 mg/day and was described as a psychostimulant and antidepressant. At lower doses, selective MAO-B inhibition would be expected, but at these higher doses, dual inhibition of MAO-A and MAO-B would occur, on the basis of L-deprenyl.

Subsequent to its synthesis, the stereoisomers of deprenyl were separated. The dextrorotatory isomer, D-deprenyl, was found to be more toxic, producing effects like hyperthermia and more potent psychostimulation in rodents. The levorotatory isomer, selegiline, was much more potent as an MAO-B inhibitor, and was subsequently developed for the treatment of Parkinson's disease and depression.

Deprenyl is reported to result in side effects including agitation, anxiety, and sleep disturbances more often than selegiline.

Similarly to selegiline, deprenyl is a catecholaminergic activity enhancer (CAE). Both enantiomers of deprenyl, D-deprenyl and selegiline, are active in this respect, but selegiline is slightly more potent than D-deprenyl.

Both of deprenyl's enantiomers show affinity for sigma receptors.

== See also ==
- Substituted amphetamine
- 4-Fluorodeprenyl
- AGN-1135 (racemic rasagiline)
- SU-11739 (racemic N-methylated rasagiline)
