= OBQ =

OBQ may refer to:

- Octahydrobenzo(g)quinoline, a saturated derivative of benzo(g)quinoline
- Odense Boldklub Q, a Danish women's football team
- Optimum batch quantity, a measure in inventory management
- Olimpíada Brasileira de Química, the Brazilian Chemistry Olympiad
