= J. Alexander Bodkin =

American psychiatrist

J. Alexander Bodkin is an American psychiatrist. He is the Director of the Clinical Psychopharmacology Research Program at McLean Hospital and Assistant Professor of Psychiatry at Harvard Medical School. Bodkin’s research focuses “on underutilized pharmacologic approaches to difficult-to-treat mood and anxiety disorders, such as MAO inhibitors, stimulants, and the opioid buprenorphine.”

Bodkin is a leading advocate in a school of thought that post-traumatic stress disorder (PTSD) is over-diagnosed by mental health professionals, and testified on behalf of the Roman Catholic Archdiocese of Hartford in a clergy sexual abuse case. Bodkin disputed the plaintiff’s psychiatric experts’ claims that he would suffer long term damage as a result of the abuse and even claimed the relationship between the plaintiff and the priest had many positive aspects and that the "clinical criteria for diagnosing the disorder had been manipulated to apply it to" the plaintiff.

== Education and training ==
=== Degrees ===
- 1978 AB in Philosophy, Columbia College
- 1985 MD, Yale School of Medicine

=== Residency ===
- 1985-1986 Internship, McLean Hospital, Mt. Auburn Hospital, Massachusetts General Hospital
- 1986-1989 Residency in Psychiatry, McLean Hospital

== Research ==
In the 1990s, Bodkin began a collaboration with Somerset to develop delivery of selegiline via a transdermal patch in order to avoid the well known dietary restrictions of MAO inhibitors. Somerset obtained FDA approval to market the patch in 2006.

== Selected publications ==
- Bodkin JA, Zornberg GL, Lukas S, Cole JO. Buprenorphine treatment of refractory depression. Journal of Clinical Psychopharmacology 1995;15(1):49-57.
- Bodkin JA, Amsterdam JD, Transdermal selegiline in major depression: a double-blind, placebo-controlled, parallel group study in outpatients. American Journal of Psychiatry 2002;159:1869-75.
- Bodkin JA, Pope HG, Detke MJ, Hudson JI. Is PTSD caused by traumatic stress? Journal of Anxiety Disorders 2007;21(2):176-182.
- Adjunctive Treatment Options for Patients With Residual Symptoms of Depression
- Not Obsolete: Continuing Roles for TCAs and MAOIs
