= 4-Fluorodeprenyl =

Clinical data
- Other names: p-F-Depreny; Fludeprenyl; N-Methyl-N-propargyl-4-fluoroamphetamine; N-Propargyl-4-fluoromethamphetamine; N-Propargyl-4-FMA
- Drug class: Stimulant; Monoamine oxidase inhibitor; MAO-B inhibitor
- ATC code: None

Identifiers
- IUPAC name: 1-(4-fluorophenyl)-N-methyl-N-prop-2-ynylpropan-2-amine
- CAS Number: 103596-43-6
- PubChem CID: 128418
- ChemSpider: 113833
- UNII: PV4SHR2L8J
- ChEMBL: ChEMBL64741
- CompTox Dashboard (EPA): DTXSID50874435

Chemical and physical data
- Formula: C_{13}H_{16}FN
- Molar mass: 205.276 g·mol^{−1}
- 3D model (JSmol): Interactive image
- SMILES: CC(CC1=CC=C(C=C1)F)N(C)CC#C
- InChI: InChI=1S/C13H16FN/c1-4-9-15(3)11(2)10-12-5-7-13(14)8-6-12/h1,5-8,11H,9-10H2,2-3H3; Key:MUDUXRHPVDVWHU-UHFFFAOYSA-N

4-Fluorodeprenyl, or p-F-deprenyl, also known as fludeprenyl or as N-methyl-N-propargyl-4-fluoroamphetamine, is a stimulant and monoamine oxidase inhibitor (MAOI) of the amphetamine family. It is the 4-fluoro derivative of deprenyl and the racemic form of 4-fluoroselegiline. The drug is metabolized into the stimulants 4-fluoroamphetamine (4-FA) and 4-fluoromethamphetamine (4-FMA) and hence acts in part as a prodrug of these metabolites. Accordingly, it produces methamphetamine-like effects in drug discrimination tests in squirrel monkeys. Like deprenyl and selegiline (L-deprenyl), 4-fluorodeprenyl is additionally a selective and irreversible inhibitor of monoamine oxidase B (MAO-B). The drug was encountered as a novel designer drug in Germany in 2019.

== See also ==
- Substituted amphetamine
- 4-Fluoroselegiline
