= 4-Fluoroselegiline =

Chemical compound

Clinical data
- Other names: Chinoin-175; Fludepryl; SR-96516-A; p-Fluoro-L-deprenyl

Identifiers
- IUPAC name: (2R)-1-(4-Fluorophenyl)-N-methyl-N-prop-2-ynylpropan-2-amine
- CAS Number: 103596-33-4
- PubChem CID: 9794264
- ChemSpider: 7970031
- UNII: 6U6PT7CR42

Chemical and physical data
- Formula: C_{13}H_{16}FN
- Molar mass: 205.276 g·mol^{−1}
- 3D model (JSmol): Interactive image
- Density: 1.024 ± 0.06 g/cm^{3}
- SMILES: C[C@H](CC1=CC=C(C=C1)F)N(C)CC#C
- InChI: InChI=1S/C13H16FN/c1-4-9-15(3)11(2)10-12-5-7-13(14)8-6-12/h1,5-8,11H,9-10H2,2-3H3/t11-/m1/s1; Key:MUDUXRHPVDVWHU-LLVKDONJSA-N

4-Fluoroselegiline, or p-fluoro-L-deprenyl, is a substituted amphetamine designer drug. It is the enantiopure L- enantiomer of 4-fluorodeprenyl and the 4-fluorinated derivative of selegiline (L-deprenyl).

== Pharmacology ==
=== Pharmacodynamics ===
4-Fluoroselegiline is a selective and irreversible inhibitor of monoamine oxidase B and monoaminergic activity enhancer.

A radiolabelled derivative incorporating ^{18}F is used to study MAO-B inhibition in both in vivo and in vitro experiments.

=== Pharmacokinetics ===
4-Fluorodeprenyl is metabolized to 4-fluoromethamphetamine and 4-fluoroamphetamine, both of which are active. The levels of substituted amphetamine metabolites in the brain is three times higher following 4-fluoroselegiline administration compared to an equivalent dose of selegiline.

== Society and culture ==
=== Names ===
Synonyms of 4-fluoroselegiline or 4-fluorodeprenyl (the racemic form) include Chinoin-175, Fludepryl, and SR-96516-A.

== See also ==
- Substituted amphetamine
