= Levoamphetamine =

CNS stimulant and isomer of amphetamine

Levoamphetamine INN: Levamfetamine

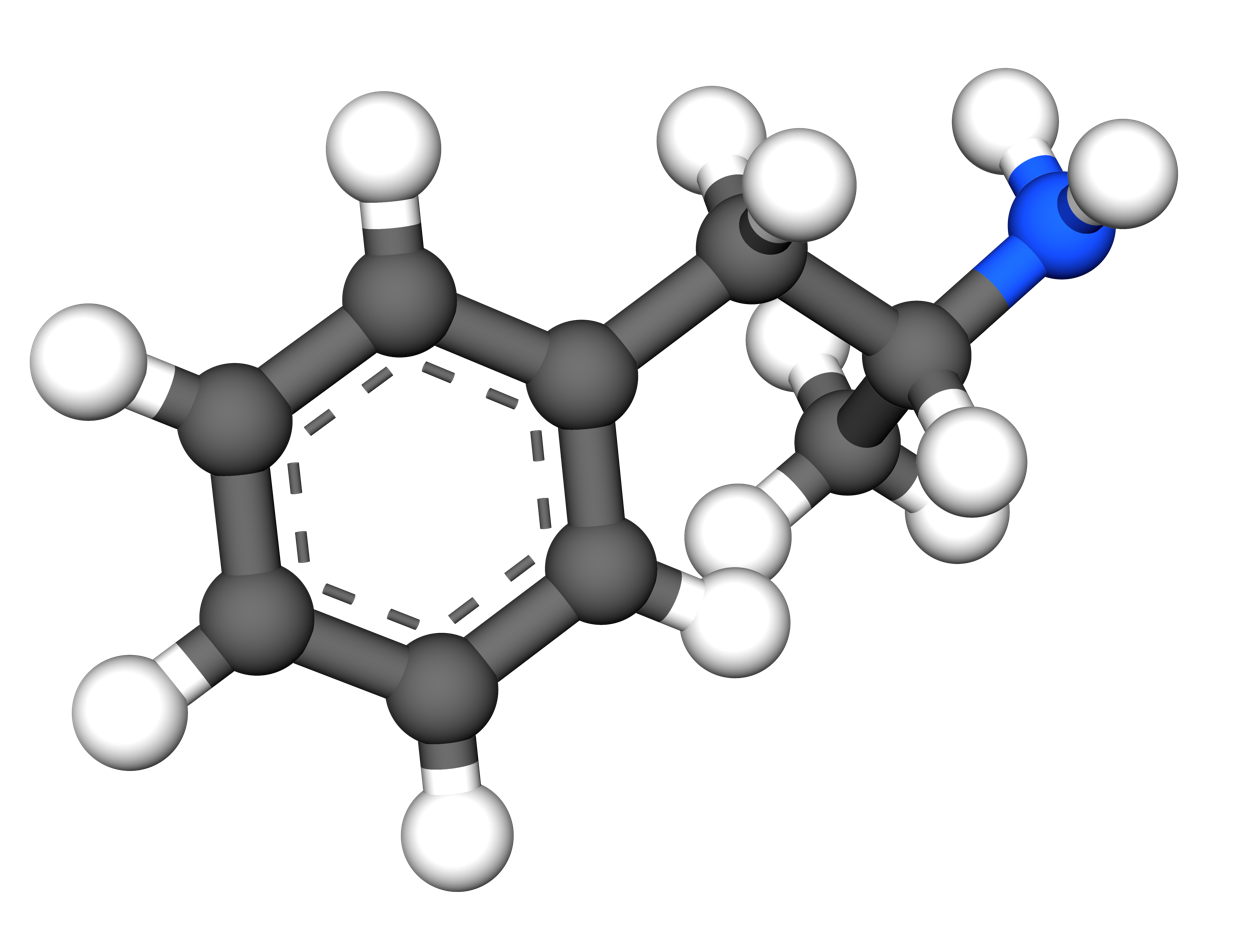

Clinical data
- Trade names: Cydril, others
- Other names: l-Amphetamine; Levafetamine; C-105; C105
- Routes of administration: Oral (as part of Adderall, Evekeo, and generic amphetamine)
- Drug class: Stimulant; Norepinephrine-dopamine releasing agent

Legal status
- Legal status: US: Schedule II; SE: Förteckning II

Pharmacokinetic data
- Protein binding: 31.7%
- Metabolism: Hydroxylation (CYP2D6), oxidative deamination
- Metabolites: L-4-Hydroxyamphetamine
- Elimination half-life: 11.7–15.2 hours
- Excretion: Urine

Identifiers
- IUPAC name: (2R)-1-Phenylpropan-2-amine
- CAS Number: 156-34-3
- PubChem CID: 32893
- IUPHAR/BPS: 2146
- ChemSpider: 30477
- UNII: R87US8P740
- ChEBI: CHEBI:42724
- ChEMBL: ChEMBL19393
- CompTox Dashboard (EPA): DTXSID20166016
- ECHA InfoCard: 100.005.320

Chemical and physical data
- Formula: C_{9}H_{13}N
- Molar mass: 135.210 g·mol^{−1}
- 3D model (JSmol): Interactive image
- Chirality: Levorotatory enantiomer
- SMILES: C[C@@H](N)Cc1ccccc1
- InChI: InChI=1S/C9H13N/c1-8(10)7-9-5-3-2-4-6-9/h2-6,8H,7,10H2,1H3/t8-/m1/s1; Key:KWTSXDURSIMDCE-MRVPVSSYSA-N

Levoamphetamine (Note: Synonyms and alternate spellings include: (2R)-1-phenylpropan-2-amine (IUPAC name), levamfetamine (International Nonproprietary Name [INN]), (R)-amphetamine, (−)-amphetamine, l-amphetamine, and L-amphetamine.) is a stimulant medication which is used in the treatment of certain medical conditions. It was previously marketed by itself under the brand name Cydril, but is now available only in combination with dextroamphetamine in varying ratios under brand names such as Adderall. The drug is known to increase wakefulness and concentration in association with decreased appetite and fatigue. Pharmaceuticals that contain levoamphetamine are currently indicated and prescribed for the treatment of attention deficit hyperactivity disorder (ADHD), obesity, and narcolepsy in some countries. Levoamphetamine is taken by mouth.

Levoamphetamine acts as a releasing agent of the monoamine neurotransmitters norepinephrine and dopamine. It is similar to dextroamphetamine in its ability to release norepinephrine and in its sympathomimetic effects but is a few times weaker than dextroamphetamine in its capacity to release dopamine and in its psychostimulant effects. Levoamphetamine is the levorotatory stereoisomer of the racemic amphetamine molecule, whereas dextroamphetamine is the dextrorotatory isomer.

Levoamphetamine was first introduced in the form of racemic amphetamine under the brand name Benzedrine in 1935 and as an enantiopure drug under the brand name Cydril in the 1970s. While pharmaceutical formulations containing enantiopure levoamphetamine are no longer manufactured, levomethamphetamine (levmetamfetamine) is still marketed and sold over-the-counter as a nasal decongestant. In addition to being used in pharmaceutical drugs itself, levoamphetamine is a known active metabolite of certain other drugs, such as selegiline (L-deprenyl).

== Medical uses ==
Levoamphetamine has been used in the treatment of attention deficit hyperactivity disorder (ADHD) both alone and in combination with dextroamphetamine at different ratios. Levoamphetamine on its own has been found to be effective in the treatment of ADHD in multiple clinical studies conducted in the 1970s. The clinical dosages and potencies of levoamphetamine and dextroamphetamine in the treatment of ADHD have been fairly similar in these older studies.

=== Available forms ===
==== Racemic amphetamine ====
The first patented amphetamine brand, Benzedrine, was a racemic (i.e., equal parts) mixture of the free bases or the more stable sulfate salts of both amphetamine enantiomers (levoamphetamine and dextroamphetamine) that was introduced in the United States in 1934 as an inhaler for treating nasal congestion. It was later realized that the amphetamine enantiomers could treat obesity, narcolepsy, and ADHD. Because of the greater central nervous system effect of the dextrorotatory enantiomer (i.e., dextroamphetamine), sold as Dexedrine, prescription of the Benzedrine brand fell and was eventually discontinued. However, in 2012, racemic amphetamine sulfate was reintroduced as the Evekeo brand name.

==== Adderall ====
Adderall is a 3.1:1 mixture of dextro- to levo- amphetamine base equivalent pharmaceutical that contains equal amounts (by weight) of four salts: dextroamphetamine sulfate, amphetamine sulfate, dextroamphetamine saccharate and amphetamine (D,L)-aspartate monohydrate. This result is a 76% dextroamphetamine to 24% levoamphetamine, or 3/4 to 1/4 ratio.

==== Evekeo ====
Evekeo is an FDA-approved medication that contains racemic amphetamine sulfate. It is approved for the treatment of narcolepsy, ADHD, and exogenous obesity. The orally disintegrating tablets are approved for the treatment of ADHD in children and adolescents aged six to 17 years of age.

==== Other forms ====
Products using amphetamine base are now marketed. Dyanavel XR, a liquid suspension form became available in 2015, and contains about 24% levoamphetamine. Adzenys XR, an orally disintegrating tablet, came to market in 2016 and contains 25% levoamphetamine.

== Side effects ==
Levoamphetamine can produce sympathomimetic side effects.

== Pharmacology ==
=== Pharmacodynamics ===
Monoamine release of levoamphetamine and related agents (EC_{50}, nM)
Compound	NE	DA	5-HT	Ref
Phenethylamine	10.9	39.5	>10,000	
Amphetamine	ND	ND	ND	ND
D-Amphetamine	6.6–7.2	5.8–24.8	698–1,765	
L-Amphetamine	9.5	27.7	ND	
Racephedrine	ND	ND	ND	ND
Ephedrine (D-)	43.1–72.4	236–1,350	>10,000	
L-Ephedrine	218	2,104	>10,000	
Methamphetamine	ND	ND	ND	ND
D-Methamphetamine	12.3–13.8	8.5–24.5	736–1,292	
L-Methamphetamine	28.5	416	4,640	
Racemic pseudoephedrine	ND	ND	ND	ND
D-Pseudoephedrine	4,092	9,125	>10,000	
Pseudoephedrine (L-)	224	1,988	>10,000	
Notes: The smaller the value, the more strongly the drug releases the neurotransmitter. See also Monoamine releasing agent § Activity profiles for a larger table with more compounds. Refs:

Levoamphetamine, similarly to dextroamphetamine, acts as a reuptake inhibitor and releasing agent of norepinephrine and dopamine in vitro. However, there are differences in potency between the two compounds. Levoamphetamine is either similar in potency or somewhat more potent in inducing the release of norepinephrine than dextroamphetamine, whereas dextroamphetamine is approximately 4-fold more potent in inducing the release of dopamine than levoamphetamine. In addition, as a reuptake inhibitor, levoamphetamine is about 3- to 7-fold less potent than dextroamphetamine in inhibiting dopamine reuptake but is only about 2-fold less potent in inhibiting norepinephrine reuptake. Dextroamphetamine is very weak as a reuptake inhibitor of serotonin, whereas levoamphetamine is essentially inactive in this regard. Levoamphetamine and dextroamphetamine are both also relatively weak reversible inhibitors of monoamine oxidase (MAO) and hence can inhibit catecholamine metabolism. However, this action may not occur significantly at clinical doses and may only be relevant to high doses.

In rodent studies, both dextroamphetamine and levoamphetamine dose-dependently induce the release of dopamine in the striatum and norepinephrine in the prefrontal cortex. Dextroamphetamine is about 3- to 5-fold more potent in increasing striatal dopamine levels as levoamphetamine in rodents in vivo, whereas the two enantiomers are about equally effective in terms of increasing prefrontal norepinephrine levels. Dextroamphetamine has greater effects on dopamine levels than on norepinephrine levels, whereas levoamphetamine has relatively more balanced effects on dopamine and norepinephrine levels. As with rodent studies, levoamphetamine and dextroamphetamine have been found to be similarly potent in elevating norepinephrine levels in cerebrospinal fluid in monkeys. By an uncertain mechanism, the striatal dopamine release of dextroamphetamine in rodents appears to be prolonged by levoamphetamine when the two enantiomers are administered at a 3:1 ratio (though not at a 1:1 ratio).

The catecholamine-releasing effects of levoamphetamine and dextroamphetamine in rodents have a fast onset of action, with a peak of effect after about 30 to 45 minutes, are large in magnitude (e.g., 700–1,500% of baseline for dopamine and 400–450% of baseline for norepinephrine), and decline relatively rapidly after the effects reach their maximum. The magnitudes of the effects of amphetamines are greater than those of classical reuptake inhibitors like atomoxetine and bupropion. In addition, unlike with reuptake inhibitors, there is no dose–effect ceiling in the case of amphetamines. Although dextroamphetamine is more potent than levoamphetamine, both enantiomers can maximally increase striatal dopamine release by more than 5,000% of baseline. This is in contrast to reuptake inhibitors like bupropion and vanoxerine, which have 5- to 10-fold smaller maximal impacts on dopamine levels and, in contrast to amphetamines, were not experienced as stimulating or euphoric.

Dextroamphetamine has greater potency in producing stimulant-like effects in rodents and non-human primates than levoamphetamine. Some rodent studies have found it to be 5- to 10-fold more potent in its stimulant-like effects than levoamphetamine. Levoamphetamine is also less potent than dextroamphetamine in its anorectic effects in rodents. Dextroamphetamine is about 4-fold more potent than levoamphetamine in motivating self-administration in monkeys and is about 2- to 3-fold more potent than levoamphetamine in terms of positive reinforcing effects in humans. Potency ratios of dextroamphetamine versus levoamphetamine with single doses of 5 to 80 mg in terms of psychological effects in humans including stimulation, wakefulness, activation, euphoria, reduction of hyperactivity, and exacerbation of psychosis have ranged from 1:1 to 4:1 in a variety of older clinical studies. (Note: Smith & Davis (1977) reviewed 11 clinical studies of dextroamphetamine and levoamphetamine including doses and potency ratios in terms of a variety of psychological and behavioral effects. The summaries of these studies are in Table 1 of the paper.) With very large doses, ranging from 270 to 640 mg, the potency ratios of dextroamphetamine and levoamphetamine in stimulating locomotor activity and inducing amphetamine psychosis in humans have ranged from 1:1 to 2:1 in a couple studies. The differences in potency and dopamine versus norepinephrine release between dextroamphetamine and levoamphetamine are suggestive of dopamine being the primary neurochemical mediator responsible for the stimulant and euphoric effects of these agents.

In addition to inducing norepinephrine release in the brain, levoamphetamine and dextroamphetamine induce the release of epinephrine (adrenaline) in the peripheral sympathetic nervous system and this is related to their cardiovascular effects. Although levoamphetamine is less potent than dextroamphetamine as a stimulant, it is approximately equipotent with dextroamphetamine in producing various peripheral effects, including vasoconstriction, vasopression, and other cardiovascular effects.

Similarly to dextroamphetamine, levoamphetamine has been found to improve symptoms in an animal model of ADHD, the spontaneously hypertensive rat (SHR), including improving sustained attention and reducing overactivity and impulsivity. These findings parallel the clinical results in which both levoamphetamine and dextroamphetamine have been found to be effective in the treatment of ADHD in humans.

Unlike the case of dextroamphetamine versus dextromethamphetamine, in which the latter is more effective than the former, levoamphetamine is substantially more potent as a dopamine releaser and stimulant than levomethamphetamine. Conversely, levoamphetamine, levomethamphetamine, and dextroamphetamine are all similar in their potencies as norepinephrine releasers.

In addition to its catecholamine-releasing activity, levoamphetamine is also an agonist of the trace amine-associated receptor 1 (TAAR1). Levoamphetamine has also been found to act as a catecholaminergic activity enhancer (CAE), notably at much lower concentrations than its catecholamine releasing activity. It is similarly potent to selegiline and levomethamphetamine but is more potent than dextromethamphetamine and dextroamphetamine in this action. The CAE effects of such agents may be mediated by TAAR1 agonism.

=== Pharmacokinetics ===
The pharmacokinetics of levoamphetamine have been studied. Usually this has been orally in combination with dextroamphetamine at different ratios. The pharmacokinetics of levoamphetamine have also been studied as a metabolite of selegiline.

==== Absorption ====
The oral bioavailability of levoamphetamine has been found to be similar to that of dextroamphetamine.

The time to peak levels of levoamphetamine with immediate-release (IR) formulations of amphetamine ranges from 2.5 to 3.5 hours and with extended-release (ER) formulations ranges from 5.3 to 8.2 hours depending on the formulation and the study. For comparison, the time to peak levels of dextroamphetamine with IR formulations ranges from 2.4 to 3.3 hours and with ER formulations ranges from 4.0 to 8.0 hours. The peak levels of levoamphetamine are proportionally similar to those of dextroamphetamine with administration of amphetamine at varying ratios. With a single oral dose of 10 mg racemic amphetamine (a 1:1 ratio of enantiomers, or 5 mg dextroamphetamine and 5 mg levoamphetamine), peak levels of dextroamphetamine were 14.7 ng/mL and peak levels of levoamphetamine were 12.0 ng/mL in one study.

Food does not affect the peak levels or overall exposure to levoamphetamine or dextroamphetamine with IR racemic amphetamine. However, time to peak levels was delayed from 2.5 hours (range 1.5–6 hours) to 4.5 hours (range 2.5–8.0 hours).

During oral selegiline therapy at a dosage of 10 mg/day, circulating levels of levoamphetamine have been found to be 6 to 8 ng/mL and levels of levomethamphetamine have been reported to be 9 to 14 ng/mL. Although levels of levoamphetamine and levomethamphetamine are relatively low at typical doses of selegiline, they could be clinically relevant and may contribute to the effects and side effects of selegiline.

==== Distribution ====
The volume of distribution of both levoamphetamine and dextroamphetamine is about 3 to 4 L/kg.

The plasma protein binding of levoamphetamine is 31.7%, whereas that of dextroamphetamine was 29.0% in the same study.

==== Metabolism ====
Levoamphetamine and dextroamphetamine are metabolized via CYP2D6-mediated hydroxylation to produce 4-hydroxyamphetamine and additionally via oxidative deamination. There are several enzymes involved in the metabolism of amphetamine, of which CYP2D6 is one. Levoamphetamine seems to be metabolized somewhat less efficiently than dextroamphetamine.

The pharmacokinetics of levoamphetamine generated as a metabolite from selegiline have been found not to significantly vary in CYP2D6 poor metabolizers versus extensive metabolizers, suggesting that CYP2D6 may be minimally involved in the clinical metabolism of levoamphetamine.

==== Elimination ====
The mean elimination half-life of levoamphetamine ranges from 11.7 to 15.2 hours in different studies. Its half-life is somewhat longer than that of dextroamphetamine, with a difference of about 1 to 2 hours. For comparison, in the same studies that reported the preceding values for levoamphetamine's half-life, the half-life of dextroamphetamine ranged from 10.0 to 12.4 hours.

The elimination of amphetamine is highly dependent on urinary pH. Urinary acidifying agents like ascorbic acid and ammonium chloride increase amphetamine excretion and reduce its elimination half-life, whereas urinary alkalinizing agents like acetazolamide enhance renal tubular reabsorption and extend its half-life. The urinary excretion of unchanged amphetamine is 70% on average with a urinary pH of 6.6 and 17 to 43% at a urinary pH of greater than 6.7.

With selegiline at an oral dose of 10 mg, levoamphetamine and levomethamphetamine are eliminated in urine and recovery of levoamphetamine is 9 to 30% (or about 1–3 mg) while that of levomethamphetamine is 20 to 60% (or about 2–6 mg).

== Chemistry ==
Levoamphetamine is a substituted phenethylamine and amphetamine. It is also known as L-α-methyl-β-phenylethylamine or as (2R)-1-phenylpropan-2-amine. Levoamphetamine is the levorotatory stereoisomer of the amphetamine molecule. Racemic amphetamine contains two optical isomers in equal amounts, dextroamphetamine (the dextrorotatory enantiomer) and levoamphetamine.

== History ==
The origin of the amphetamine psychostimulants comes from ephedra. This plant, also known as "ma huang", is an herb which has been used for thousands of years in traditional Chinese medicine as a stimulant and antiasthmatic medicine. Ephedrine ((1R,2S)-β-hydroxy-N-methylamphetamine), an analogue and derivative of amphetamine and the major pharmacologically active constituent of ephedra, was first isolated from the plant in 1885. Another plant, known as Catha edulis (khat), also naturally contains amphetamines, specifically cathine ((1S,2S)-β-hydroxyamphetamine) and cathinone (β-ketoamphetamine). It has a long history of use for its stimulant effects in Eastern Africa and the Arabian Peninsula. However, cathine was not isolated from khat until 1930 and cathinone was not isolated from the plant until 1975.

Amphetamine, which is a racemic mixture of dextroamphetamine and levoamphetamine, was first discovered in 1887, shortly after the isolation of ephedrine. However, it was not until 1927 that amphetamine was synthesized by Gordon Alles and was studied by him in animals and humans. This led to the discovery of the stimulating effects of amphetamine in humans in 1929 after Alles injected himself with 50 mg of the drug. Levoamphetamine was first introduced in the form of racemic amphetamine (a 1:1 combination of levoamphetamine and dextroamphetamine) under the brand name Benzedrine in 1935. It was indicated for the treatment of narcolepsy, mild depression, parkinsonism, and a variety of other conditions. Dextroamphetamine was found to be the more potent of the two enantiomers of amphetamine and was introduced as an enantiopure drug under the brand name Dexedrine in 1937. Consequent to its lower potency, levoamphetamine has received far less attention than racemic amphetamine or dextroamphetamine.

Levoamphetamine was studied in the treatment of attention deficit hyperactivity disorder (ADHD) in the 1970s and was found to be clinically effective for this condition similarly to dextroamphetamine. As a result, it was marketed as an enantiopure drug under the brand name Cydril for the treatment of ADHD in the 1970s. However, it was reported in 1976 that racemic amphetamine was less effective than dextroamphetamine in treating ADHD. As a result of this study, use of racemic amphetamine in the treatment of ADHD dramatically declined in favor of dextroamphetamine. Enantiopure levoamphetamine was eventually discontinued and is no longer available today.

== Society and culture ==
=== Legal status ===
Levoamphetamine is a controlled substance in the Philippines.

=== Recreational use ===
Misuse of enantiopure levoamphetamine and levomethamphetamine is reportedly not known. However, rare cases of misuse of levomethamphetamine, which is available over-the-counter as a nasal decongestant, actually have been reported. Due to their lower efficacy in stimulating dopamine release and their reduced potency as psychostimulants, levoamphetamine and levomethamphetamine would theoretically be expected to have less misuse potential than the corresponding dextroamphetamine and dextromethamphetamine forms.

== Research ==
Levoamphetamine as an enantiopure drug has been studied in the past in a variety of contexts. These include its effects in and/or treatment of mood, "minimal brain dysfunction", narcolepsy, "hyperkinetic syndrome" and aggression, sleep, schizophrenia, wakefulness, Tourette's syndrome, and Parkinson's disease, among others. Levoamphetamine has been studied in the treatment of multiple sclerosis in more modern studies and has been reported to improve cognition and memory in this condition as well. It was under development for this indication under the name levafetamine and the developmental code name C-105 and reached phase 2 clinical trials, but development was discontinued sometime after 2008.

== Other drugs ==
=== Selegiline ===
Levoamphetamine is a major active metabolite of selegiline (L-deprenyl; N-propargyl-L-methamphetamine). Selegiline is a monoamine oxidase inhibitor (MAOI), specifically a selective inhibitor of monoamine oxidase B (MAO-B) at lower doses and a dual inhibitor of both monoamine oxidase A (MAO-A) and MAO-B at higher doses. It also has additional activities, such as acting as a catecholaminergic activity enhancer (CAE), possibly via agonism of the TAAR1, and having potential neuroprotective effects. Selegiline is clinically used as an antiparkinsonian agent in the treatment of Parkinson's disease and as an antidepressant in the treatment of major depressive disorder.

In addition to levoamphetamine, selegiline also metabolizes into levomethamphetamine. With a 10 mg oral dose of selegiline, about 2 to 6 mg levomethamphetamine and 1 to 3 mg levoamphetamine is excreted in urine. As levoamphetamine and levomethamphetamine are norepinephrine and/or dopamine releasing agents, they may contribute to the effects and side effects of selegiline. This may particularly include cardiovascular and sympathomimetic effects of selegiline. Other selective MAO-B inhibitors that do not metabolize into amphetamine metabolites or have associated cardiovascular effects, such as rasagiline, have also been developed and introduced.

Because selegiline metabolizes into levoamphetamine and levomethamphetamine, people taking selegiline can erroneously test positive for amphetamines on drug tests.

== See also ==
- List of investigational cognition and memory disorder drugs
