= Octahydrobenzo(g)quinoline =

Names
- IUPAC name 1,2,3,4,4a,5,10,10a-octahydrobenzo[g]quinoline

Identifiers
CAS Number	67728-01-2
3D model (JSmol)	Interactive image
ChEMBL	ChEMBL133947
ChemSpider	14807249
PubChem CID	20186598
CompTox Dashboard (EPA)	DTXSID80603290
- InChI: InChI=1S/C13H17N/c1-2-5-11-9-13-12(6-3-7-14-13)8-10(11)4-1/h1-2,4-5,12-14H,3,6-9H2 Key: PXDWMPVOPNRION-UHFFFAOYSA-N
- SMILES: C1CC2CC3=CC=CC=C3CC2NC1

Properties
Chemical formula	C_{13}H_{17}N
Molar mass	187.286 g·mol^{−1}
- Except where otherwise noted, data are given for materials in their standard state (at 25 °C [77 °F], 100 kPa). Infobox references

1,2,3,4,4a,5,10,10a-Octahydrobenzo[g]quinoline (also known as octahydrobenzo[g]quinoline or OBQ) is a saturated (hydrogenated on two rings) derivative of benzo[g]quinoline, and is also a rigid cyclized analog of 2-aminotetralin. Most OBQ derivatives are dopaminergic or adrenergic drugs. Within this class of compounds, the ring-joining configurations are categorized in such a way as to distinguish between trans- and cis-configurations; one of the related compounds is the class of octahydrobenzo[f]quinolines.
