= Norepinephrine–dopamine releasing agent =

Drug class

Amphetamine, the prototypical NDRA.

A norepinephrine–dopamine releasing agent (NDRA) is a type of drug which induces the release of norepinephrine (and epinephrine) and dopamine in the body and/or brain. Many of these are amphetamine-type stimulants.

== Examples ==
Examples of NDRAs include phenethylamine, tyramine, amphetamine, dextroamphetamine, levoamphetamine, methamphetamine, lisdexamfetamine (prodrug of dextroamphetamine), 4-fluoroamphetamine, cathine, cathinone, methcathinone, phentermine, phenmetrazine, aminorex, and benzylpiperazine.

== Amphetamine-type stimulants ==
Amphetamine-type stimulants (ATS) are a group of synthetic drugs that are chemical derivatives of the parent compound alpha-methylphenethylamine, also known as amphetamine. Common ATS include amphetamine, methamphetamine, ephedrine, pseudoephedrine, 3,4-methylenedioxymethamphetamine (MDMA), 3,4-methylenedioxyamphetamine (MDA) and 3,4-methylenedioxyethylamphetamine (MDEA). ATS used illicitly often have street names such as ice, meth, crystal, crank, bennies, and speed. Within the group of amphetamine-type stimulants, there are also prescription drugs including mixed amphetamine salts, dextroamphetamine, and lisdexamfetamine.

Amphetamine was first synthesized in 1887 by the Romanian chemist Lazar Edeleano. It has since been used to treat a range of disorders from asthma to ADHD and illicitly for recreational purposes. Amphetamine-type stimulants contain chemical groups including an unsubstituted phenyl ring, a methyl group at the alpha-position, and a primary amino group, which accounts for its psychostimulant activities. ATS with multiple substitutions on the phenyl ring have a hallucinogenic effect on top of the psychostimulant effects, and are categorised as ecstasy-class drugs.

Amphetamine-type stimulants in general are sympathomimetic amines that stimulate the central nervous system, also proven to cause insomnia, arousal, and reduced hunger. Due to its physiological and psychological effects, ATS have been used to suppress appetite, improve cognitive performance, as well as treating ADHD, depression, and narcolepsy. Amphetamine-type stimulants are also known for their addictive properties and widespread problems of substance abuse. The adverse effects of ATS, especially when used chronically, include obsessive–compulsive tendencies, anxiety, paranoia, hallucinations, aggression, mania and in extreme cases, amphetamine psychosis.

== Chemistry ==
Ephedrine is the precursor of synthetic amphetamines. The diastereomer of ephedrine, pseudoephedrine is found in Ephedra sinica together along with ephedrine. Ephedrine and pseudoephedrine are both generally used for weight reduction and performance enhancement. They can also be reduced to methamphetamine.

The activity of amphetamine-type stimulants depends on their unsubstituted phenyl ring, alphy methyl group, primary amino group and two-carbon side-chain that connects the primary amino group and the phenyl ring.

Hallucinogenic activity of ATS are often caused by multiple substitutions on the phenyl ring, with examples including 2,5-dimethoxy-4-bromoamphetamine and 2,5-dimethoxy-4-methylamphetamine. When the methoxy group is substituted in the para position of the ATS molecule, the hallucinogenic potency will become significantly high.

== Pharmacology ==
Amphetamine-type stimulants can be subdivided based on their activity on the central nervous system, compounds with hallucinogenic properties are the MDMA-related compounds. All ATS act as psychostimulants, which produce stimulatory effects and lead to hyperarousal and increased movement, while MDMA-related compounds that possess a structure similar to mescaline have hallucinogenic properties on top of psychostimulant properties.

=== Pharmacodynamics ===
Amphetamine-type stimulants facilitate monoamine neurotransmission by blocking membrane monoamine transporters, nameley norepinephrine, dopamine and serotonin transporters at the presynapse, resulting in prolonged clearance of monoamines from the synaptic cleft. Additionally they facilitate the reverse transport of monoamine neurotransmitters at said transporters, leading to non-exocytotic monoamine release. This reverse-transport is further promoted by some ATS's ability to inhibit vesicular monoamine transporter 2 (VMAT2) and heightened intracellular monoamine concentrations. VMAT2 transports monoamines from the intracellular compartment into vesicles, which serve as storage and are essential for physiological monoamine release.

FATS, to varying extents, inhibit monoamine oxidase and hence inhibits monoamine degradation. Some ATS also interact with intracellular receptors in presynaptic neurons further modulating monoaminergic neurotransmission. For instance, methamphetamine acts as an agonist of sigma-1 receptor and is well known to be a TAAR1 agonist.

ATS use disorders are related to the GABA system. Research shows that ATS use would affect normal function of the GABAA receptors. Clonazepam, which is a GABAA receptor positive allosteric modulator, is shown to prevent the acquisition of behavioural sensitization to methamphetamine. GABAA receptor antagonist is shown to aggravate ATS use disorders. Hence, a possible mechanism could be that activating GABAA receptor reduces dopaminergic neurotransmission and GABAA receptors may have an inhibitory role in ATS-induced disorders.

ATS also inhibit GABAB receptors, glutamic acid decarboxylase (GAD), GABA transporters (GAT) and promote GABA metabolism. This leads to the reduced expression of extracellular GABA expression, inhibited biosynthesis of GABA-nergic neurotransmitter and depressed function of GABAB receptors-GIRK channels.

=== Pharmacokinetics ===
ATS can be administered via oral (swallowing), intranasal (inhaling vapour or snorting), and intravenous routes. Taking ATS orally is the most common route of administration. The response time and other pharmacokinetics profile of ATS varies for different routes of administration.

Clinical pharmacokinetics of methamphetamine
Route	Dose	Bioavailability	C_{max} (g/L)	Tmax (minutes)	T_{1/2} (hours)	Time to peak effect (minutes)
Intravenous	30 mg	100%	108 22	6	9.1 0.8	15
Oral	30 mg	67%	94.1	216	9.1	18 2
Smoking	30 mg	67%/ 90 10%	47 6	150 30	12 1	180
Intra-nasal	50 mg	79%	113 8	169 8	11 1	15

ATS are metabolised by liver enzymes especially cytochrome P450 2D6, producing metabolites including 4-hydroxyamphetamine, 4 hydroxynorephedrine, hippuric acid, benzoic acid and benzyl methyl ketone. The metabolism of ATS may vary from person to person due to genetic polymorphism of the enzyme CYP450 2D6. Under normal conditions, around 5 to 30% of amphetamine is excreted unchanged in the urine. However, the urinary excretion of amphetamine and other ATS is highly dependent on the pH. A small amount of amphetamine is also produced from metabolism of methamphetamine, but does not cause any significant clinical effect.

== Uses ==
NDRAs have psychostimulant effects and are used to treat medical conditions like attention-deficit hyperactivity disorder (ADHD), binge eating disorder, obesity, narcolepsy, and for other indications. They are also used to increase motivation and to enhance performance.

=== Treatment of Attention Deficit Hyperactivity Disorder ===
Dextroamphetamine and lisdexamfetamine are widely used for Attention Deficit Hyperactivity Disorder (ADHD). These two drugs are first-line drugs for children, adolescents and adults.

=== Antidepressant ===
Amphetamine has been used in the past to treat anhedonia, a major phenomenon of depression. The use of ATS as an antidepressant was no longer common after the production of the more effective tricyclic antidepressants and monoamine oxidase inhibitors (MAOI). ATS were established as a detriment to public health.

=== Appetite suppressant ===
A study conducted by the pharmaceutical company Smith, Kline & French (SKF) in 1947 showed that amphetamine can affect the brain center for appetite and help to reduce weight. In the late 1960s, weight reduction was the most common indication for ATS. Nowadays, to suppress appetite, phentermine is still used.

=== Treatment for narcolepsy ===
Amphetamine-type stimulants can be used in the treatment of narcolepsy, a rare neurological disorder where the brain is unable to regulate the sleep-wake mechanism. Amphetamines causes an increase in dopamine release, which is the proposed mechanism for its wake-promoting effect. ATS such as dextroamphetamine are used in the treatment of narcolepsy when another CNS stimulant, modafinil is not effective.

=== Cognitive performance ===
Early users of amphetamine-type stimulants may report that their cognitive performance and working abilities are improved. Low-to-moderate doses of ATS improve psychomotor output without significantly affecting memory, verbal task performance and intelligence measures. ATS may boost the school performance of some students through emotional mechanisms that serve to increase their confidence; in most jurisdictions, however, amphetamine-type stimulants are not prescribed for this use legally.

=== Abuse ===
Amphetamine is frequently used for pleasure and abused because of its addictive properties. The definition of ATS abuse is a maladaptive pattern of substance use manifested by recurrent and significant adverse consequences related to the repeated use of substances, while dependence refers to the use of amphetamine 'accompanied by evidence of tolerance, withdrawal, or compulsive behaviour". Abuse of ATS is a threat to global public health. The United Nations World Drug Report states that about 0.3–1.3% of the global population has ATS abuse problems, where methamphetamine accounts for 71% of global ATS seizures.

== Adverse effects ==
The adverse effect of ATS may be caused by many factors, including overdose of prescribed drugs, or use of illicit substance that are not safe in any pharmacological relevant dose. ATS-related fatality and toxicity usually arises from abuse of ATS, rather than adverse drug reactions. ATS may lead to serious health issues with dose-dependent severity.

Undesired acute effects	Effects of chronic Use
Increase in heart rate, blood pressure, rapid breathing; High body temperature, sweating; Behaviour abnormal, mood change; Nausea and vomiting; Hyper-excitability, insomnia, talkativeness, restlessness, irritability, hallucinations at high doses; Convulsion, seizures, arrhythmia and/or heart failure, cerebral hemorrhage; Serotonin syndrome; Pupil dilation	Psychological dependence; Development of tolerance; Malnutrition, weight loss; Disorientation, apathy, confused exhaustion due to lack of sleep; Potential depression, anxiety, fatigue; With prolonged use, ATS-induced psychosis may occur

=== Psychosis ===
Substantial evidence shows that psychotic patients, especially patients with schizophrenia, are more likely to engage in ATS abuse. ATS abuse inhibits dopamine transporter (DAT) and increases dopamine level in the synaptic cleft. The extent of DAT inhibition is associated with the symptoms. Amphetamine-type stimulants-induced psychosis has been reported ever since 1938. Symptoms mainly include delusions and hallucinations. Different kinds of hallucinations are also seen, like auditory, visual, olfactory and tactile hallucinations. Less common symptoms are bizarre behaviour and thought disorder. Though some believed that the ATS-induced psychosis cannot be distinguished from schizophrenia, delusions of persecution are often reported as a characteristic of ATS-induced psychosis.

The duration of ATS-induced psychosis has substantial variations, from weeks to months. Based on their durations, psychosis can be divided into two types. One type has a shorter psychotic state that shows improvement as the central action of ATS changes. The other type has a longer duration.

=== Toxicity ===
Different ATS drugs possess different toxicity thresholds, and the toxic dose of an ATS varies between individuals due to development of drug tolerance and genetic polymorphism of the CYP450 2D6 gene. For example, methamphetamine fatalities have been reported after ingestion of a minimal dose of 1.3 mg/kg, despite the estimated minimum lethal dose in a non-addicted adult being 200 mg. Generally, children are more likely to develop toxicity and have lower chances of developing tolerance.

=== Treatment ===
Studies suggest that ATS-induced psychosis may be treatable by risperidone and olanzapine; other studies suggest preventing sensitisation in the first place via the concurrent use of low-dose antipsychotic medications.

Studies show that antidepressants like fluoxetine, imipramine and desipramine do have very limited beneficial effects for ATS abuse by potentially reducing cravings or by increasing the period of adherence to short-to-medium-term treatments.

A variety of psychosocial interventions have been shown to be effective in reducing substance abuse and risk behaviours associated with ATS. The implementation and development of intensive psychosocial intervention is strongly recommended, as well as their adaptation to the social context in which they are to be implemented.

== Similar drugs ==
A closely related type of drug is the norepinephrine–dopamine reuptake inhibitors (NDRIs) such as bupropion, methylphenidate, and nomifensine.

== History ==
Amphetamine, the parent compound of amphetamine-type stimulants, was first synthesized by Romanian chemists Lazar Edeleano in 1887. Around the same time, amphetamine's precursor ephedrine was also abstracted from a Chinese herbal medicine ephedra by a Japanese Chemist. After its discovery, amphetamine was purified and put into medical use in the 1900s. Amphetamine was originally sold as a decongestant inhaler in the United States in 1933, and led to widespread ATS abuse in military forces and civilians later on.

== See also ==
- Monoamine releasing agent
- Dopamine releasing agent
- Norepinephrine releasing agent
- Serotonin–norepinephrine–dopamine releasing agent
