= C12H13N =

The molecular formula C_{12}H_{13}N (molar mass: 171.24 g/mol, exact mass: 171.1048 u) may refer to:

- AGN-1135, a drug
- Rasagiline, a drug
- N,N-dimethyl-1-naphthylamine, a dye
- More than 400 other chemical compounds
