= C9H11N =

The molecular formula C_{9}H_{11}N may refer to:

- Aminoindanes
  - 1-Aminoindane
  - (R)-1-Aminoindane
  - 2-Aminoindane, an amphetamine analog
- Tetrahydroisoquinoline, a heterocyclic compound that forms the core of some alkaloids
- Tetrahydroquinoline
- Tranylcypromine, an antidepressant
