= C11H13N =

The molecular formula C_{11}H_{13}N (molar mass: 159.228 g/mol) may refer to:

- Pargyline
- 2,3,4,5-Tetrahydro-1,5-methano-1H-3-benzazepine
