= 1-Aminoindane =

Chemical compound

Clinical data
- Other names: 1-AI; 1-Aminoindan; 1-Indanylamine; 1-Indanamine; (RS)-1-Aminoindane; (±)-1-Aminoindane

Identifiers
- IUPAC name: 2,3-dihydro-1H-inden-1-amine
- CAS Number: 34698-41-4
- PubChem CID: 123445
- ChemSpider: 110041
- UNII: 8UP8M3CGS8
- ChEMBL: ChEMBL158574
- CompTox Dashboard (EPA): DTXSID20902754

Chemical and physical data
- Formula: C_{9}H_{11}N
- Molar mass: 133.194 g·mol^{−1}
- 3D model (JSmol): Interactive image
- SMILES: C1CC2=CC=CC=C2C1N
- InChI: InChI=1S/C9H11N/c10-9-6-5-7-3-1-2-4-8(7)9/h1-4,9H,5-6,10H2; Key:XJEVHMGJSYVQBQ-UHFFFAOYSA-N

1-Aminoindane (1-AI), also known as 1-aminoindan, 1-indanylamine, or 1-indanamine, is an aminoindane. It is a positional isomer of 2-aminoindane. A variety of notable derivatives of 1- and 2-aminoindane are known. The (R)-enantiomer of 1-aminoindan, (R)-1-aminoindan, is pharmacologically active and is an active metabolite of the antiparkinsonian agent rasagiline.

1-Aminoindane was used in the synthesis of an agent that is called Pevonedistat.

== Pharmacology ==
Through its (R)-enantiomer (R)-1-aminoindane, 1-aminoindane has pharmacological activity. It specifically shows neuroprotective and catecholamine-modulating actions.

== Chemistry ==
1-Aminoindane is an aminoindane. It is a racemic mixture of (R)- and (S)-enantiomers. The (R)-enantiomer is (R)-1-aminoindan, which has pharmacological activity and is an active metabolite of the antiparkinsonian agent rasagiline.

=== Derivatives ===
A number of notable 1-aminoindane derivatives exist. These include the following:

- 1-Aminoindan-1,5-dicarboxylic acid (AIDA) – selective mGlu_{1} receptor antagonist
- 1-Amino-5-phosphonoindan-1-carboxylic acid (APICA) – selective mGlu_{2} and mGlu_{3} receptor antagonist
- AGN-1135 (racemic rasagiline; N-propargyl-1-aminoindane) – irreversible MAO-B inhibitor
- Indatraline (Lu 19-005) – serotonin–norepinephrine–dopamine reuptake inhibitor
- Ladostigil (TV-3326) – irreversible MAO-B inhibitor and reversible acetylcholinesterase and butyrylcholinesterase inhibitor
- Ozanimod (Zeposia) – sphingosine-1-phosphate receptor agonist
- Rasagiline (Azilect; N-propargyl-(R)-1-aminoindane) – selective irreversible MAO-B inhibitor and neuroprotective agent
- SU-11739 (AGN-1133; J-508; N-methyl-N-propargyl-1-aminoindane) – non-selective monoamine oxidase inhibitor and catecholamine releasing agent
- Zicronapine (Lu 31-130) – experimental atypical antipsychotic (D_{1}, D_{2}, and 5-HT_{2A} receptor antagonist)

=== Analogues ===
Jimscaline, 2CB-Ind, and AMMI are derivatives of 1-aminomethylindane, an indane- and amine-containing compound closely related to 1-aminoindane.

1-Aminoindane is a positional isomer of 2-aminoindane. A variety of notable 2-aminoindane derivatives also exist.
