= Mofegiline =

Chemical compound

Clinical data
- Other names: MDL-72,974A
- Routes of administration: Oral
- ATC code: None

Legal status
- Legal status: Development terminated

Pharmacokinetic data
- Elimination half-life: 1–3 hours
- Excretion: Urine

Identifiers
- IUPAC name: (2E)-2-(fluoromethylidene)-4-(4-fluorophenyl)butan-1-amine
- CAS Number: 119386-96-8
- PubChem CID: 6437850
- ChemSpider: 4942371
- UNII: 1FMJ6D8Y1B
- CompTox Dashboard (EPA): DTXSID50869629

Chemical and physical data
- Formula: C_{11}H_{13}F_{2}N
- Molar mass: 197.229 g·mol^{−1}
- 3D model (JSmol): Interactive image
- SMILES: Fc1ccc(cc1)CCC(=[C@H]F)CN
- InChI: InChI=1S/C11H13F2N/c12-7-10(8-14)2-1-9-3-5-11(13)6-4-9/h3-7H,1-2,8,14H2/b10-7+; Key:VXLBSYHAEKDUSU-JXMROGBWSA-N

Mofegiline (MDL-72,974) is a selective, irreversible inhibitor of monoamine oxidase B (MAO-B) and semicarbazide-sensitive amine oxidase (SSAO) which was under investigation for the treatment of Parkinson's disease and Alzheimer's disease, but was never marketed.

== See also ==
- Ladostigil
- Lazabemide
- Rasagiline
- Selegiline
