= C3H5N =

The molecular formula C_{3}H_{5}N (molar mass: 55.08 g/mol, exact mass: 55.0422 u) may refer to:

- 1-Azabicyclo[1.1.0]butane
- 1-Azetine (dihydroazete)
- 2-Azetine
- Propargylamine (2-propynylamine)
- Propionitrile (propanenitrile)
