= SU-11739 =

Monoamine oxidase inhibitor

Clinical data
- Other names: AGN-1133; J-508; N-Methyl-N-propargyl-1-aminoindane; (±)-N-Methylrasagiline; (RS)-N-Methylrasagiline

Identifiers
- IUPAC name: N-methyl-N-prop-2-ynyl-2,3-dihydro-1H-inden-1-amine
- CAS Number: 1875-49-6
- PubChem CID: 15179
- ChemSpider: 14447
- UNII: 37N2TO074R
- CompTox Dashboard (EPA): DTXSID40953900

Chemical and physical data
- Formula: C_{13}H_{15}N
- Molar mass: 185.270 g·mol^{−1}
- 3D model (JSmol): Interactive image
- SMILES: CN(CC#C)C1CCC2=CC=CC=C12
- InChI: InChI=1S/C13H15N/c1-3-10-14(2)13-9-8-11-6-4-5-7-12(11)13/h1,4-7,13H,8-10H2,2H3; Key:CSVGVHNFFZWQJU-UHFFFAOYSA-N

SU-11739 (other developmental code names AGN-1133, J-508; also known as N-methyl-N-propargyl-1-aminoindane) is an experimental monoamine oxidase inhibitor (MAOI) that was never marketed.

It is a dual or non-selective irreversible monoamine oxidase A (MAO-A) and monoamine oxidase B (MAO-B) inhibitor, with preference for inhibition of MAO-B over MAO-A. It is less selective for MAO-B inhibition than AGN-1135 (racemic rasagiline) or rasagiline. In addition to its MAOI activity, SU-11739 has been reported to have strong activity as a catecholamine releasing agent. Similarly to rasagiline, but unlike selegiline and desmethylselegiline, SU-11739 is not a monoaminergic activity enhancer (MAE).

The drug is the racemic N-methylated analogue of rasagiline. It is also a ring-cyclized analogue of pargyline with about 20 times the MAOI potency of pargyline.

SU-11739 was discovered before rasagiline and was patented in 1965.
