= Corey lactone 4-phenylbenzoate =

Chemical compound

Identifiers
- IUPAC name: (3aR,4S,5R,6aS)-4-(Hydroxymethyl)-2-oxohexahydro-2H-cyclopenta[b]furan-5-yl 4-biphenylcarboxylate
- CAS Number: 31752-99-5
- PubChem CID: 2724295
- ChemSpider: 2006444
- UNII: 5Z6XHA7HUG
- CompTox Dashboard (EPA): DTXSID00369124
- ECHA InfoCard: 100.119.775

Chemical and physical data
- Formula: C_{21}H_{20}O_{5}
- Molar mass: 352.386 g·mol^{−1}
- 3D model (JSmol): Interactive image
- SMILES: O=C3O[C@H]4C[C@@H](OC(=O)c2ccc(c1ccccc1)cc2)[C@H](CO)[C@H]4C3
- InChI: InChI=1S/C21H20O5/c22-12-17-16-10-20(23)25-18(16)11-19(17)26-21(24)15-8-6-14(7-9-15)13-4-2-1-3-5-13/h1-9,16-19,22H,10-12H2/t16-,17-,18+,19-/m1/s1; Key:SZJVIFMPKWMGSX-AKHDSKFASA-N

Corey lactone 4-phenylbenzoate is a synthetic intermediate used in the manufacture of some prostaglandin derivatives. It has been used as a false name by some designer drug manufacturers as a label to sell substituted cathinone derivatives after the banning of mephedrone and related drugs in some jurisdictions - but there is no evidence to suggest that Corey lactone 4-phenylbenzoate has any stimulant effects in its own right.

== See also ==
- 2,3,4,5-Tetrahydro-1,5-methano-1H-3-benzazepine
