= Ladostigil =

Chemical compound

Clinical data
- Other names: TV-3326; (N-Propargyl-(3R)-aminoindan-5-yl)-N-propylcarbamate
- Routes of administration: Oral
- ATC code: None

Legal status
- Legal status: In general: uncontrolled

Identifiers
- IUPAC name: [(3R)-3-(prop-2-ynylamino)indan-5-yl]-N-propylcarbamate
- CAS Number: 209394-27-4
- PubChem CID: 208907
- ChemSpider: 181005
- UNII: SW3H1USR4Q
- KEGG: D03239
- CompTox Dashboard (EPA): DTXSID101045854

Chemical and physical data
- Formula: C_{16}H_{20}N_{2}O_{2}
- Molar mass: 272.348 g·mol^{−1}

Ladostigil (developmental code name TV-3326) is a novel neuroprotective agent being investigated for the treatment of neurodegenerative disorders like Alzheimer's disease, Lewy body disease, and Parkinson's disease. It was developed from structural modification of rasagiline.

The drug acts as a reversible acetylcholinesterase and butyrylcholinesterase inhibitor, and an irreversible monoamine oxidase B inhibitor, and combines the mechanisms of action of older drugs like rivastigmine and rasagiline into a single molecule. In addition to its neuroprotective properties, ladostigil enhances the expression of neurotrophic factors like GDNF and BDNF, and may be capable of reversing some of the damage seen in neurodegenerative diseases via the induction of neurogenesis. Ladostigil also has antidepressant-like effects in animals, and may be useful for treating comorbid depression and anxiety often seen in such diseases as well.

There have been no new updates on the pharmaceutical development of ladostigil since 2019. At this time, it was in phase 2 clinical trials for Alzheimer's disease.

== See also ==
- Mofegiline
- Rasagiline
- Selegiline
