= 2,3,4,5-Tetrahydro-1,5-methano-1H-3-benzazepine =

Chemical compound

2,3,4,5-tetrahydro-1,5-methano-1H-3-benzazepine

Legal status
- Legal status: In general: uncontrolled

Identifiers
- IUPAC name: 2,3,4,5-tetrahydro-1,5-methano-1H-3-benzazepine
- CAS Number: 230615-52-8
- ChemSpider: 8373558
- UNII: 5F3AKZ2PNU
- ChEMBL: ChEMBL192387

Chemical and physical data
- Formula: C_{11}H_{13}N
- Molar mass: 159.232 g·mol^{−1}
- 3D model (JSmol): Interactive image
- SMILES: c13ccccc3C2CC1CNC2
- InChI: InChI=1S/C11H13N/c1-2-4-11-9-5-8(6-12-7-9)10(11)3-1/h1-4,8-9,12H,5-7H2; Key:COMHUAMOJSTCMM-UHFFFAOYSA-N

2,3,4,5-Tetrahydro-1,5-methano-1H-3-benzazepine is a drug originally researched as a potential opioid analgesic, but was found to be inactive in this assay, and relatively toxic to mice. Subsequently it was found to possess activity as an agonist at nicotinic acetylcholine receptors during the course of work that ultimately led to the discovery of the anti-smoking drug varenicline.

More recently this chemical compound is claimed to have been sold as a designer drug under the name A3A, but since the anecdotally reported effects of the product sold under this name do not seem to bear any resemblance to the known pharmacology of genuine 2,3,4,5-tetrahydro-1,5-methano-1H-3-benzazepine, it seems unlikely that this is actually the compound being sold.

== See also ==
- Corey lactone 4-phenylbenzoate
