= (R)-1-Aminoindane =

Major metabolite of rasagiline

Clinical data
- Other names: (R)-1-Aminoindan; (R)-(−)-1-Aminoindan; (R)-AI; (R)-1-AI; TVP-136; TV-136; (R)-(−)-1-Indanamine

Identifiers
- IUPAC name: (1R)-2,3-dihydro-1H-inden-1-amine
- CAS Number: 10277-74-4
- PubChem CID: 2733933
- ChemSpider: 2015696
- UNII: I17RC77CJ2
- ChEMBL: ChEMBL4573666

Chemical and physical data
- Formula: C_{9}H_{11}N
- Molar mass: 133.194 g·mol^{−1}
- 3D model (JSmol): Interactive image
- SMILES: C1CC2=CC=CC=C2[C@@H]1N
- InChI: InChI=1S/C9H11N/c10-9-6-5-7-3-1-2-4-8(7)9/h1-4,9H,5-6,10H2/t9-/m1/s1; Key:XJEVHMGJSYVQBQ-SECBINFHSA-N

(R)-1-Aminoindane ((R)-1-AI; developmental code name TVP-136 or TV-136), or (R)-1-aminoindan, is the major metabolite of the selective MAO-B inhibitor and antiparkinsonian agent rasagiline ((R)-N-propargyl-1-aminoindane). In contrast to rasagiline, it lacks significant monoamine oxidase inhibition. In addition, unlike selegiline and its amphetamine metabolites, it lacks monoamine reuptake-inhibiting and -releasing activities and associated amphetamine-like psychostimulant effects. However, (R)-1-aminoindane retains neuroprotective effects and certain other activities.

== Pharmacology ==
=== Pharmacodynamics ===
In contrast to rasagiline, (R)-1-aminoindane is either devoid of monoamine oxidase inhibition or shows only weak inhibition of MAO-B. Unlike selegiline and its levomethamphetamine and levoamphetamine metabolites, rasagiline and (R)-1-aminoindane have no amphetamine-like activity.

In spite of the preceding however, (R)-1-aminoindane is not lacking in pharmacological activity. Like rasagiline, it shows neuroprotective activity in some experimental models. In addition, (R)-1-aminoindane has been found to enhance striatal dopaminergic neurotransmission and to improve motor function independent of MAO inhibition in animal models of Parkinson's disease.

2-Aminoindane, a closely related positional isomer of 1-aminoindane, is known to inhibit the reuptake and induce the release of dopamine and norepinephrine and to produce psychostimulant-like effects in rodents, albeit with lower potency than amphetamine. However, rasagiline does not metabolize into this compound, and 1-aminoindane does not have the same effects. 1-Aminoindane has been found to inhibit the reuptake of norepinephrine 28-fold less potently than 2-aminoindane and to inhibit the reuptake of dopamine 300-fold less potently than 2-aminoindan, with IC_{50} values for dopamine reuptake inhibition in one study of 0.4 μM for amphetamine, 3.3 μM for 2-aminoindan, and 1 mM for 1-aminoindane. In contrast to 2-aminoindan, which increased locomotor activity in rodents (+49%), 1-aminoindane suppressed locomotor activity (–69%). On the other hand however, 1-aminoindane has been found to enhance the psychostimulant-like effects of amphetamine in rodents.

== Chemistry ==
(R)-1-Aminoindane is a 1-aminoindane derivative. It is specifically the (R)-enantiomer of 1-aminoindane, which is a racemic mixture of (R)- and (S)-enantiomers. 1-Aminoindane is structurally related to 2-aminoindan. A number of derivatives of 1- and 2-aminoindane are known.
