= N,N-Dimethyl-1-naphthylamine =

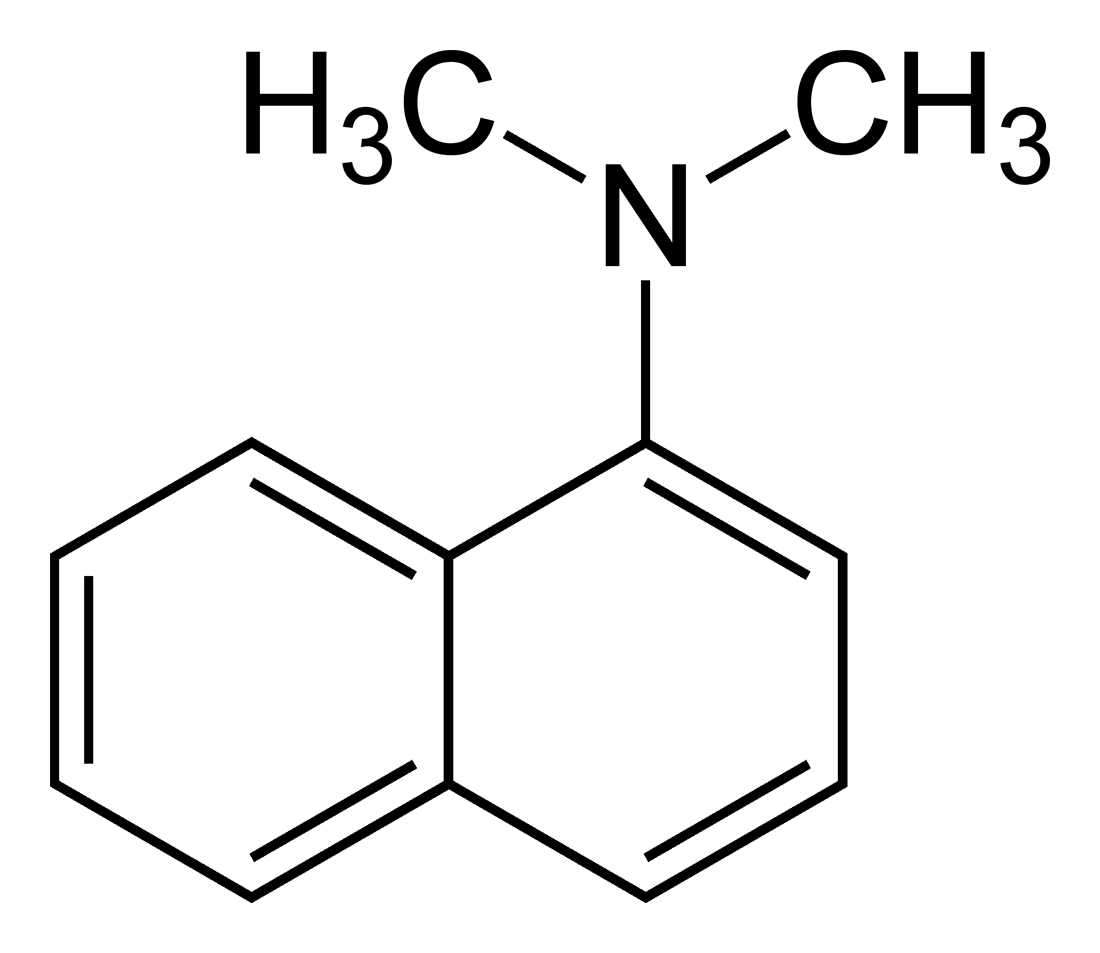
- skeletal formula

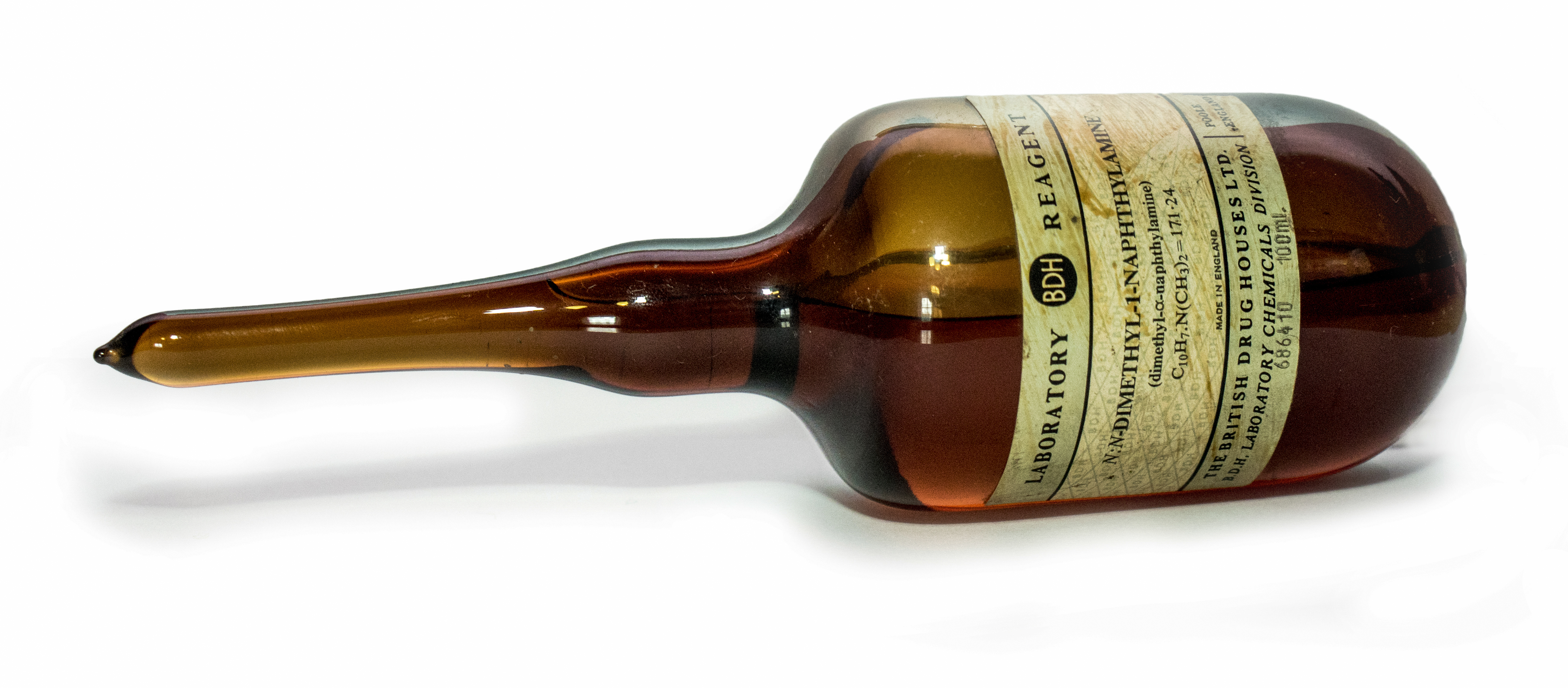
- Ampoule with substance.

Names
- Preferred IUPAC name N,N-Dimethylnaphthalen-1-amine

Identifiers
CAS Number	86-56-6
3D model (JSmol)	Interactive image
ChemSpider	6587
ECHA InfoCard	100.001.530
PubChem CID	6848
UNII	020063I9Y0
CompTox Dashboard (EPA)	DTXSID9058941
- InChI: InChI=1/C12H13N/c1-13(2)12-9-5-7-10-6-3-4-8-11(10)12/h3-9H,1-2H3 Key: AJUXDFHPVZQOGF-UHFFFAOYAQ
- SMILES: c1cccc2cccc(N(C)C)c12

Properties
Chemical formula	C_{12}H_{13}N
Molar mass	171.243 g·mol^{−1}
Density	1.042 g/cm^{3} at 25 °C
Boiling point	139 to 140 °C (282 to 284 °F; 412 to 413 K) at 13 mmHg

Related compounds
Related compounds	1-naphthylamine 1-naphthol naphthalene aniline dimethylaniline Proton Sponge
- Except where otherwise noted, data are given for materials in their standard state (at 25 °C [77 °F], 100 kPa). Infobox references

N,N-Dimethyl-1-naphthylamine is an aromatic amine. It is formally derived from 1-naphthylamine by replacing the hydrogen atoms on the amino group with methyl groups. N,N-Dimethyl-1-naphthylamine is used in the nitrate reductase test to form a precipitate of a red azo dye by reacting with a nitrite-sulfanilic acid complex.
