= Aminoindane =

Aminoindane refers to a class of compounds that are structurally related to indane, a bicyclic hydrocarbon. These compounds are characterized by the presence of an amino group attached to the indane structure. Aminoindanes have been studied for their potential applications in various fields, including medicine and neuroscience. Notable aminoindanes include 1-aminoindane its derivatives and 2-aminoindane and its derivatives.

== Chemical structure and properties ==
- Chemical Formula: C_{9}H_{11}N
- Molar Mass: 133.19 g/mol
- SMILES Notation: C1C(CC2=CC=CC=C21)N

Aminoindanes are typically divided into two main isomers: 1-aminoindane and 2-aminoindane. Each isomer has unique properties and potential applications.

=== 1-Aminoindane ===
1-Aminoindane (1-AI) is known for its pharmacological activity, particularly as a neuroprotective agent. It is a metabolite of the antiparkinsonian drug rasagiline and has been studied for its potential to modulate catecholamine levels in the brain.

=== 2-Aminoindane ===
2-Aminoindane (2-AI) is a research chemical with applications in neurological disorders and psychotherapy. It acts as a selective substrate for norepinephrine and dopamine transporters. 2-AI has also been sold as a designer drug and is known to have stimulant effects similar to those of amphetamines.

== Derivatives and analogues ==
Several derivatives and analogues of aminoindanes have been developed, each with distinct pharmacological profiles. Notable derivatives include:

- 5-IAI: A derivative with potential applications in psychotherapy
- MDAI: Known for its entactogenic effects
- NM-2-AI: A methylated analogue of 2-AI with similar stimulant properties

== Legal status ==
The legal status of aminoindanes varies by country. For example, 2-AI is a controlled substance in China and Sweden. In the United States, it is not scheduled at the federal level but may be considered an analogue of amphetamine, making its sale or possession potentially prosecutable under the Federal Analogue Act.

== Applications and research ==
Aminoindanes have been explored for their potential therapeutic uses, particularly in the treatment of neurological disorders. They have also been studied for their stimulant and empathogenic effects, which have led to their use as designer drugs.

== Safety and toxicity ==
While aminoindanes have shown promise in various applications, their safety and toxicity profiles are still under investigation. Some studies have reported toxic effects in both animal models and clinical settings.

== See also ==
- Substituted 2-aminoindane
- 1-Aminoindane § Derivatives
