= Arylalkyl acylamidase =

arylalkyl acylamidase

Identifiers
- EC no.: 3.5.1.76

Databases
- IntEnz: IntEnz view
- BRENDA: BRENDA entry
- ExPASy: NiceZyme view
- KEGG: KEGG entry
- MetaCyc: metabolic pathway
- PRIAM: profile
- PDB structures: RCSB PDB PDBe PDBsum
- Gene Ontology: AmiGO / QuickGO
Search
- PMC: articles
- PubMed: articles
- NCBI: proteins

In enzymology, an arylalkyl acylamidase (EC 3.5.1.76) is an enzyme that catalyzes the chemical reaction

N-acetylarylalkylamine + H_{2}O $\rightleftharpoons$ arylalkylamine + acetate

Thus, the two substrates of this enzyme are N-acetylarylalkylamine and H_{2}O, whereas its two products are arylalkylamine and acetate.

This enzyme belongs to the family of hydrolases, those acting on carbon-nitrogen bonds other than peptide bonds, specifically in linear amides. The systematic name of this enzyme class is N-acetylarylalkylamine amidohydrolase. This enzyme is also called aralkyl acylamidase.
