= AGN-1135 =

Monoamine oxidase inhibitor; racemic form of rasagiline

Clinical data
- Other names: AGN-1135; Racemic rasagiline; (±)-Rasagiline; (RS)-Rasagiline; N-Propargyl-1-aminoindane

Identifiers
- IUPAC name: N-prop-2-ynyl-2,3-dihydro-1H-inden-1-amine
- CAS Number: 1875-50-9
- PubChem CID: 122316
- ChemSpider: 13409715
- UNII: UZ2TR4YN26
- CompTox Dashboard (EPA): DTXSID00861335

Chemical and physical data
- Formula: C_{12}H_{13}N
- Molar mass: 171.243 g·mol^{−1}
- 3D model (JSmol): Interactive image
- SMILES: C#CCNC1CCC2=CC=CC=C12
- InChI: InChI=1S/C12H13N/c1-2-9-13-12-8-7-10-5-3-4-6-11(10)12/h1,3-6,12-13H,7-9H2; Key:RUOKEQAAGRXIBM-UHFFFAOYSA-N

AGN-1135 (also known as racemic rasagiline or as N-propargyl-1-aminoindane) is a monoamine oxidase inhibitor (MAOI) that was never marketed. It is the racemic form of rasagiline and is a mixture of the R(+)-enantiomer (rasagiline; TVP-1012) and S(–)-enantiomer (TVP-1022). Like rasagiline, AGN-1135 is a selective monoamine oxidase B (MAO-B) inhibitor. Virtually all of the MAOI activity of AGN-1135 lies in rasagiline, which is several orders of magnitude more potent as an MAO-B inhibitor than the S(–)-enantiomer. In relation to this, enantiopure rasagiline was developed and marketed for use as a pharmaceutical drug rather than AGP-1135.

== See also ==
- Deprenyl (the racemic form of selegiline)
- SU-11739 (the racemic N-methyl analogue of rasagiline)
- Desmethylselegiline (DMS; the N-demethylated analogue of selegiline)
