= Propargylamine =

Names
- Other names: 2-Propyn-1-amine; prop-2-yn-1-amine

Identifiers
CAS Number	2450-71-7
3D model (JSmol)	Interactive image
ChEMBL	ChEMBL3263480
ChemSpider	208829
ECHA InfoCard	100.017.740
EC Number	219-513-8
PubChem CID	239041
CompTox Dashboard (EPA)	DTXSID30862951
- InChI: InChI=1S/C3H5N/c1-2-3-4/h1H,3-4H2 Key: JKANAVGODYYCQF-UHFFFAOYSA-N
- SMILES: C#CCN

Properties
Chemical formula	C_{3}H_{5}N
Molar mass	55.080 g·mol^{−1}
Appearance	colorless liquid
Density	0.867 g/cm^{3}
Boiling point	83 °C (181 °F; 356 K)
Refractive index (n_{D})	1.449

Hazards
- GHS labelling
Pictograms	(GHS02: Flammable) (GHS05: Corrosive) (GHS06: Toxic) (GHS07: Exclamation mark)
Signal word	Danger
Hazard statements	H225, H302, H310, H314
Precautionary statements	P210, P233, P240, P241, P242, P243, P260, P262, P264, P264+P265, P270, P280, P301+P317, P301+P330+P331, P302+P352, P302+P361+P354, P303+P361+P353, P304+P340, P305+P354+P338, P316, P317, P321, P330, P361+P364, P363, P370+P378, P403+P235, P405, P501
Flash point	6 °C (43 °F; 279 K)
- Except where otherwise noted, data are given for materials in their standard state (at 25 °C [77 °F], 100 kPa). Infobox references

Propargylamine is an organic compound with the formula HC≡CCH_{2}NH_{2}. It is a colorless, odorless liquid that is used as a precursor to other compounds. Propargyl amines are produced by reactions of amines with propargyl halides.

The behavior of propargyl amine is illustrated by its acylation benzoyl chloride to the amide. A Sonogashira coupling of the terminal alkyne end with another equivalent of benzoylchloride gives the dicarbonyl, a precursor to an oxazole.

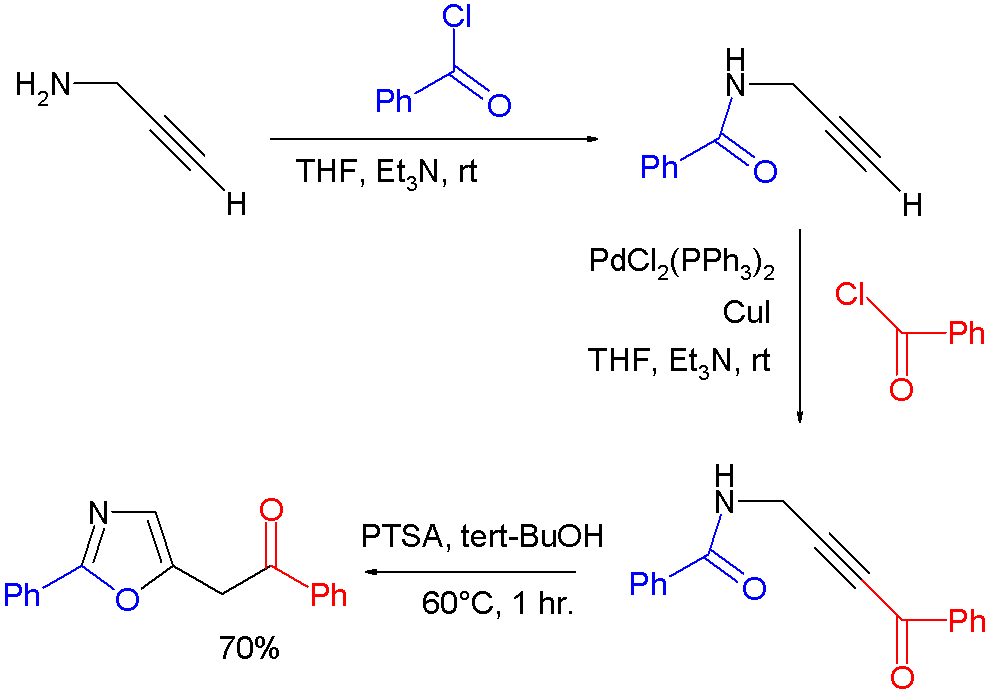

== Drugs ==
Propargylamine is used in the synthesis of:

1. Etintidine [69539-53-3]
2. 2-PAT
3. HDAC1/MAO-B-IN-1 [2759855-37-1]
